= List of Heroes of the Russian Federation (S) =

This is a list of people who have been awarded the title Hero of the Russian Federation.

It has been awarded more than 970 times, of which more than 440 were posthumously.

== List of Heroes of the Russian Federation ==
- Anatoly Savelyev (ru)
- Ivan Savin (ru)
- Andrey Savitsky (ru)
- Aleksandr Savchenko (ru)
- Vadim Cavchuk (ru)
- Anatoly Sagalevich
- Yuri Salimkhanov (ru)
- Nikolai Salnikov (ru)
- Andrey Samankov (ru)
- Viktor Samoylin (ru)
- Sergey Samoylov (ru)
- Aleksandr Samokutyaev
- Leonid Saplitsky (ru)
- Vladimir Sarabeev (ru)
- Igor Sarychev (ru)
- Dmitry Safin (ru)
- Anatoly Safronov (ru)
- Rif Sakhabitdinov (ru)
- Viktor Sviridov (ru)
- Igor Sviridov (ru)
- Vladimir Sevankaev (ru)
- Vladimir Severin (ru)
- Aleksandr Seleznyov (ru)
- Vladimir Selivyorstov (ru)
- Sergey Seliverstov (ru)
- Aleksey Semenkov (ru)
- Vladimir Semenkov (ru)
- Dmitry Semyonov (ru)
- Aleksandr Semerenko (ru)
- Aleksandr Sergeev (ru)
- Vladimir Sergeev (ru)
- Gennady Sergeev (ru)
- Yevgeny Sergeev (ru)
- Igor Sergeev
- Igor Sergun
- Andrey Serdyukov
- Dmitry Serkov (ru)
- Igor Serog (ru)
- Yelena Serova
- Vyacheslav Sivko (ru)
- Roman Sidorov (ru)
- Yuri Sidorov (ru)
- Yevgeny Sizonenko (ru)
- Aleksandr Silin (ru)
- Mikhail Simonov
- Aleksandr Sinelnik (ru)
- Andrey Sinitsyn (ru)
- Timur Sirazetdinov (ru)
- Konstantin Sitkin (ru)
- Aleksey Sitnikov (ru)
- Nikolai Sitnikov (ru)
- Aleksandr Skvortsov (cosmonaut)
- Aleksey Skvortsov (ru)
- Valery Skorokhodov (ru)
- Ilya Skripnikov (ru)
- Oleg Skripochka
- Nikolai Skrypnik (ru)
- Andrey Skryabin (ru)
- Valery Slasten (ru)
- Dmitry Slinkin (ru)
- Viktor Sloka (ru)
- Aleksandr Smirnov (ru)
- Georgy Smirnov (ru)
- Nikolai Smirnov (ru)
- Sergey Olegovich Smirnov (ru)
- Sergey Vladimirovich Smirnov (ru)
- Andrey Sovgirenko (ru)
- Roman Sokolov (ru)
- Sergey Sokolov (ru)
- Andrey Soldatenkov (ru)
- Sergey Solnechnikov
- Dmitry Solovyev (ru)
- Igor Solovyev (ru)
- Aleksandr Solomatin (ru)
- Konstantin Somov (ru)
- Sergey Somov (ru)
- Aleksandr Sorogovets (ru)
- Yuri Sorokin (ru)
- Roman Spiridonov (ru)
- Oleg Spichka (ru)
- Sergey Spravtsev (ru)
- Yuri Stavitsky (ru)
- Igor Stankevich (ru)
- Aleksandr Starovoytov (ru)
- Anton Starostin (ru)
- Sergey Stvolov
- Vladimir Stepanov (ru)
- Aleksandr Sterzhantov (ru)
- Valery Stovba (ru)
- Oleg Storozhuk (ru)
- Mikhail Strekalovsky (ru)
- Aleksandr Stytsina (ru)
- Anatoly Sugakov (ru)
- Mukhtar Suleymanov (ru)
- Yuri Sulimenko (ru)
- Serik Sultangabiev (ru)
- Tatyana Sumarokova
- Aleksandr Suponinsky (ru)
- Maksim Suraev
- Konstantin Surkov (ru)
- Sergey Surovikin
- Sergey Sushchenko (ru)
- Ilya Sizov (ru)
- Pavel Syutin (ru)
- Sergey Shavrin (ru)
- Roman Shadrin (ru)
- Yuri Shadura (ru)
- Minigali Shaymuratov
- Vladimir Shamanov
- Sergey Shantsev (ru)
- Yuri Shargin
- Salizhan Sharipov
- Vladimir Sharpatov
- Vladimir Shatalin (ru)
- Vladimir Shatov (ru)
- Aleksandr Shvaryov (ru)
- Andrey Shevelyov
- Nikolai Shevelyov (ru)
- Sergey Shevelyov (ru)
- Pavel Shevchenko (ru)
- Yuri Shevchenko (ru)
- Sergey Sheyko
- Dmitry Shektaev (ru)
- Ivan Shelokhvostov (ru)
- Vladimir Shendrik (ru)
- Yevgeny Shendrik (ru)
- Andrey Sherstyannikov (ru)
- Yuri Sheffer (ru)
- Vyacheslav Shibilkin (ru)
- Fyodor Shikunov
- Vladimir Shirokov (ru)
- Aleksey Shiryaev (ru)
- Girgory Shiryaev (ru)
- Igor Shifrin (ru)
- Karen Shishkin (ru)
- Anton Shkaplerov
- Pyotr Shkidchenko (ru)
- Valery Shkurny (ru)
- Yevgeny Shnitnikov (ru)
- Sergey Shoigu
- Nikolai Shpitonkov (ru)
- Sergey Shrayner (ru)
- Gennady Shtern (ru)
- Oleg Shubin (ru)
- Lidiya Shulaykina
- Viktor Shulyak (ru)
- Aleksandr Shulyakov (ru)
- Vladimir Shushunov (ru)
- Oleg Shchepetkov (ru)
- Leonid Shcherbakov
- Yuri Shcherbakov (ru)
- Roman Shchetnev (ru)
