= Sheyko =

Sheyko (Ukrainian Sheyko) is also sometimes spelled Sheiko is a Ukrainian surname.It does not change according to the gender of the bearer.

== Notable people ==
- Evgeny Sheyko (born 1962), Russian conductor
- Georgiy Sheiko (born 1989), Kazakhstani racewalker
- Sergey Sheyko (born 1967), Russian Naval officer and hero of the Russian Federation
