= BMD-1 =

Soviet airborne infantry fighting vehicle

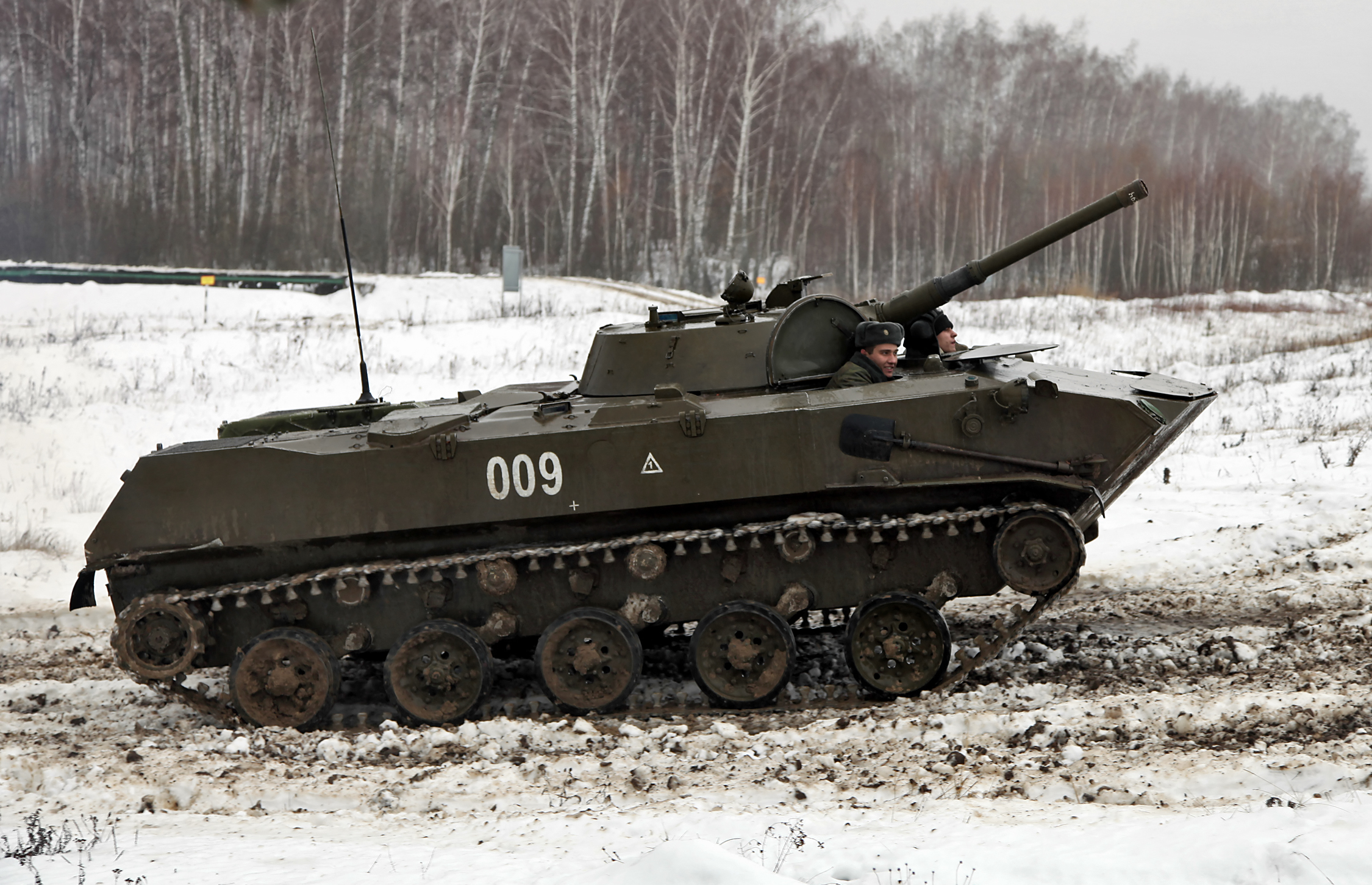
- BMD-1 in Russian service, 2011.
- Type: Airborne infantry fighting vehicle
- Place of origin: Soviet Union

Service history
- In service: 1969–present
- Used by: See Operators
- Wars: See Service history and Combat history

Production history
- Designer: Volgograd Tractor Plant
- Designed: 1965–1969
- Manufacturer: Volgograd Tractor Plant
- Produced: 1968–1987
- Variants: See Variants

Specifications (BMD-1)
- Mass: 7.5 t (7.4 long tons; 8.3 short tons); 8.3 t (8.2 long tons; 9.1 short tons) (combat weight)
- Length: 5.41 m (17.7 ft)
- Width: 2.53 m (8.3 ft)
- Height: 1.97 m (6.5 ft)
- Crew: 2 (driver + gunner) + 6 dismounts (commander + machine gunner + 3-4 troopers)
- Armor: welded aluminium alloy 26–33 mm gun mantlet 6-23 mm turret 15 mm lower hull 10 mm rest of the hull
- Main armament: 73 mm 2A28 "Grom" smoothbore gun (40 rounds); 9M14M / 9M111M / 9M113 ATGMs (3 rounds)
- Secondary armament: 7.62 mm PKT coaxial tank machine gun (2,000 rounds); 2x 7.62 mm PKT hull machine gun (4,000 rounds)
- Engine: 5D-20 6-cylinder diesel engine 241 hp (180 kW) at 2,600 rpm
- Power/weight: 32.1 hp/tonne (24 kW/tonne); 18.1 hp/tonne (13.5 kW/tonne) (loaded with equipment)
- Suspension: hydraulic independent torsion-bar
- Ground clearance: Adjustable; 100 mm to 450 mm
- Fuel capacity: 300 L (79 US gal)
- Operational range: 600 km (370 mi) (road); 116 km (72 mi) (water)
- Maximum speed: 80 km/h (50 mph) (road); 45 km/h (28 mph) (cross country); 10 km/h (6.2 mph) (swimming)

The BMD-1 is a Soviet airborne amphibious tracked infantry fighting vehicle (IFV), which was introduced in 1969 and first seen by the West in 1970. BMD stands for Boyevaya Mashina Desanta (Боевая Машина Десанта, which literally translates to "Airborne Combat Vehicle"). It can be dropped by parachute and although it is of similar shape to the BMP-1 it is smaller, at just over half the weight. The BMD-1 was used as an IFV by the Soviet Airborne Forces (VDV). An improved variant of the BMD-1 was developed, the BMD-2. The BMD-1 also provided a basis for the BTR-D airborne multi-purpose tracked APC.

== Development ==
In the wake of the Cuban Missile Crisis, the army was instructed to consider putting more emphasis on means to project power outside of the normal sphere of Soviet influence. As a result, there was a major effort to develop the VDV as a rapid deployment force. Soviet studies of airborne operations had shown that lightly armed paratroops were unable to deal with armoured forces. Also, in the early 1960s, the BMP-1 infantry fighting vehicle was being developed. Before the BMP-1 entered service in 1966, the Soviet Army high command decided to equip the newly created airborne divisions with similar vehicles.

The use of Antonov An-12 aircraft during the BMD development limited the transport to only light armored vehicles for an airborne drop, each weighing less than seven tons. Because the existing BMP-1 weighed 13 tonnes, it was effectively ruled out of being considered for the VDV service.

The task of designing the BMD fell to the Volgograd Tractor Factory, which had produced an unsuccessful competitor to the Ob'yekt 764 that eventually became the BMP-1 – the Ob'yekt 914. The BMD design, Ob'yekt 915, was basically a trimmed-down version of the Ob'yekt 914 – smaller, lighter aluminium armour, while retaining the 73mm 2A28 "Grom" low-pressure smoothbore short-recoil semi-automatic gun. The compromise made is the extremely cramped crew compartment.

Development started in 1965 and trials began in 1967. A limited production began in 1968. After operational trials, it was commissioned on 14 April 1969 and serial production started in 1970, although the vehicle weighed 500 kg more than what the requirements stated (7.5 tonnes and 13.3 tonnes when loaded with equipment).

Starting from 1977 a new modernized vehicle received a designation BMD-1P following adoption of the new 9P135M-1 ATGM launcher instead of 9S428 ATGM launcher, firing the 9M113 Konkurs (AT-5 Spandrel) and 9M111M Fagot or 9M111-2 (standard load: two 9M113 and one 9M111M missiles). Most of older BMD-1s were subsequently modernized this way.

In 1983, based on the combat experience in Afghanistan, a decision was made to produce a new variant of the BMD with a weapon capable of engaging targets such as those faced by the airborne troops in that conflict. This resulted in "Ob'yekt 916", which later became the BMD-2.

A lengthened BMD-1 chassis served as the basis for the BTR-D airborne multi-purpose tracked APC, which itself served as a basis for many specialized airborne vehicles.

== Description ==
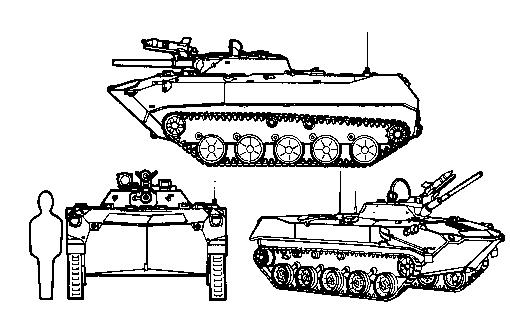
BMD-1 three-view graphic.

=== Overview ===
The BMD-1 can be thought of as a BMP intended for airborne troops. The vehicle therefore must be lighter and smaller in order to meet airdrop weight requirements (the BMD-1 is secured to a pallet and parachute-dropped from cargo planes).

The BMD-1 has an unconventional layout for an IFV. From the front to the back of the vehicle, the compartments are located in the following formation: steering, fighting, troop, and engine. This is because the BMD-1 is based on Ob'yekt 914, which in turn is based on the PT-76 amphibious light tank (refer to BMP development § Prototypes for details). This meant that transported troops had to mount and dismount the vehicle via the roof hatches, which made them an easy target on the battlefield when these actions were performed.

=== Crew ===
The crew consists of four soldiers: driver, commander, gunner, and bow machine gunner, two of which (commander and machine gunner) are included in the number of soldiers carried. The driver's station is located centrally in the front of the vehicle and has a hatch that is opened by raising it and rotating it to the right. The driver is provided with three periscope vision blocks, which allow him to view the outer environment when his hatch is closed. The center one can be replaced with a night vision device for use in the night and bad visibility conditions or with an extended periscope for swimming with the trim vane erected. The commander's station is on the driver's left. It is provided with a hatch, one periscope vision block, an outer environment observation device, and an R-123 radio set for communications. He also fires the left bow machine gun. The right one is operated by a bow machine gun gunner, who sits to the right of the driver. The gunner's station is located on the left side of the turret, like in the BMP-1, and has the same equipment (see Gunner's station section in the BMP-1 article for details).

=== Turret ===
The BMD-1 has the same turret as the BMP-1.

=== Armament ===
The vehicle is armed with a 73 mm 2A28 Grom gun and a 7.62 mm PKT coaxial tank machine gun. Mounted on the mantlet is the 9S428 ATGM launcher capable of firing 9M14 Malyutka (NATO: AT-3A Sagger A) and 9M14M Malyutka-M (NATO: AT-3B Sagger B) ATGMs (for which the vehicle carries two ATGMs in the turret). There are also two 7.62 mm PKT machine guns in fixed mounts, one in each corner of the bow.

=== Mobility ===
==== Maneuverability ====
The vehicle is powered by a 5D-20 6-cylinder 4-stroke V-shaped liquid-cooled 15.9-liter diesel engine, which develops 270 hp (201 kW) at 2,600 revolutions per minute. The engine drives a manual gearbox with five forward and one reverse gear.

The BMD-1 has a maximum road speed of 80 kilometers per hour, reduced to around 45 kilometers per hour off-road and 10 kilometers per hour while swimming.

The BMD-1 can climb 0.8-meter-high (2.6 ft) vertical obstacles, cross 1.6-meter-wide (5.2 ft) trenches, and 30% side slopes. It can climb 60% gradients. The BMD-1 has a ground pressure of 0.57 kg/cm^{2}.

The 230 mm wide track is driven at the rear and passes over five small evenly spaced road wheels suspended on independent torsion bars. On each side, there is an idler wheel at the front, a rear drive sprocket, and four track-return rollers. The independent suspension combines a hydraulic system for altering the ground clearance and maintaining the track tension with pneumatic springs, which enables the ground clearance to be altered from 100 mm to 450 mm. The alternative ground clearance allows easier transportation in an airplane.

==== Amphibious ability ====
The BMD-1 is fully amphibious, it can swim after switching on the two electric bilge pumps, erecting the two-piece trim vane which improves the vehicle's stability and displacement in water and prevents the water from flooding the bow of the tank, and switching the driver's periscope for a swimming periscope that enables the driver to see over the trim vane. When not in use the trim vane is placed in its laying position in the front of the bow under the barrel of the main gun and serves as additional armour. There is also a manual bilge pump for emergency use. The bilge pumps keep the vehicle afloat even if it is hit, damaged or leaks. In water, it is propelled by two hydro jets, one on each side of the hull, with the entrance under the hull and exits at the rear of the hull. The rear exits have lids that can be fully or partially closed, redirecting the water stream to the forward-directed exits at the sides of the hull, thus enabling the vehicle to turn or float reverse, for example, to go left, the left water jet is closed, reducing thrust on that side and redirecting some or all of the water flow to the forward facing nozzle. To go right, the right water-jet is covered. The closure of the nozzles is proportionate to the control input. To make a 180° turn the left water-jet can direct water to the rear nozzle and the right water-jet to the front nozzle, creating forward thrust on one side and reverse thrust on the other, or the vehicle can reverse by closing both nozzles and directing all water flow out the forward nozzles (see PT-76 for full explanation of the water jet system).

==== Air-drop techniques ====
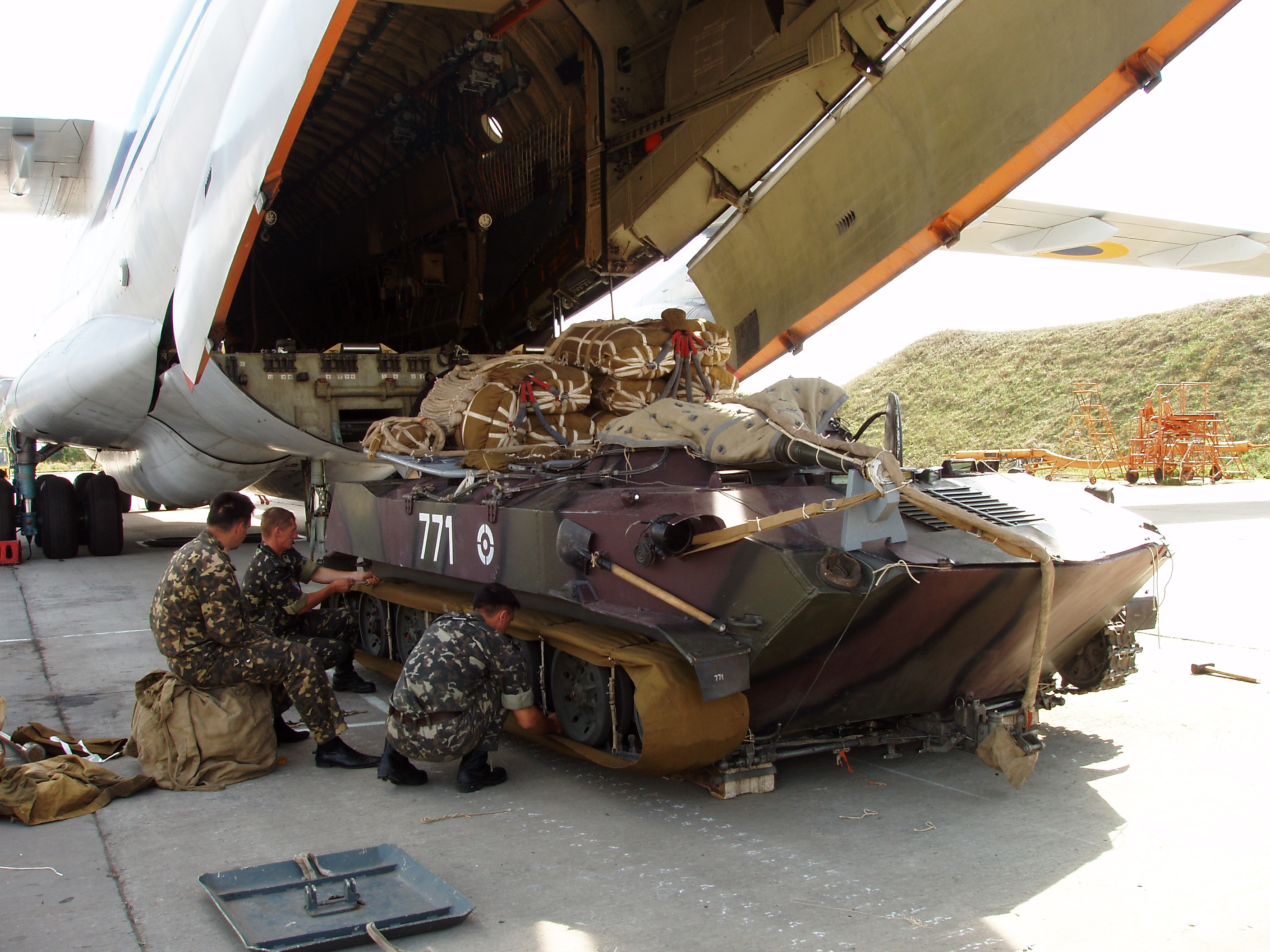
BMD-1 of the Armed Forces of Ukraine being rigged up for parachute drop before being loaded onto an Il-76 transport aircraft, 2006.

The vehicle can be transported by An-12, An-22, Il-76, An-124 airplanes and Mi-6 and Mi-26 helicopters.

The BMD was originally dropped under the MKS-350-9 multi-canopy parachute with a descending speed between 15 m/s and 20 m/s. The intention was to drop the vehicle off without the crew. This proved to be very problematic since the crew frequently landed at a considerable distance from the vehicle and often had trouble finding it. Also, the vehicle itself could easily land in a location from which it couldn't be extracted (either because of a lack of suitable equipment or because of the location being virtually inaccessible). Several experiments were done in the 1970s in order to find a way to circumvent these limitations, including dropping the BMD with the two key crew members, the driver, and the gunner, seated inside the vehicle during the descent. The first such test took place on 23 January 1976 with Lieutenant-Colonel Leonid Shcherbakov and Major Aleksandr Margelov, and the concept was proved to be valid in a subsequent series of tests.

A rocket parachute, the PRSM-915, was developed to ensure the vehicle's safe landing. To use the parachute, the BMD is first packed onto a special pallet before take-off. To drop the BMD, a drogue chute is released that initially drags the BMD out of the Il-76 transport plane. Once clear of the plane a single large main chute opens. The deployment of the main chute triggers the deployment of four long rods which hang beneath the pallet. As soon as the rods touch the ground retrorocket fires, slowing the BMD to a descending speed between 6 m/s and 7 m/s and giving it a relatively soft landing. This system entered service in 1975 and allows a BMD to be relatively safely parachuted with both the driver and the gunner.

=== Armour protection ===
The BMD-1's armour is made of ABT-101 an alloy composed of 91% Aluminum, 6% Zinc, and 3% Magnesium. The BMD-2 on the other hand is composed of ABT-102, which is 94% Aluminum, 4% Zinc, and 2% Magnesium.

Armour thickness is 23 mm at 42° on the front of the turret, 19 mm at 36° on the sides of the turret, 13 mm at 30° on the rear of the turret, 6 mm on the top of the turret, 15 mm on the front of the hull and 10 mm on the rest of the hull. The hull's front armour has two sections: upper and lower. The upper section is angled at 78° while the lower one is angled at 50°. It is resistant to small arms fire and shrapnel.

=== Troop compartment ===
Many compromises had to be made to the design in order to save the necessary weight, not least to crew comfort. The BMD-1 has an extremely cramped interior space, which is much smaller than that found in the BMP-1 and BMP-2 IFVs. It can carry five infantrymen, comprising the vehicle's commander, bow machine gunner, and three soldiers seated behind a turret.

Nevertheless, it is equipped with periscope vision blocks on the sides and rear of the vehicle. There are only three firing ports, one on each side of the hull and one in the rear. As standard, the vehicle carries the following weapons inside the troop compartment: an RPG-7 or RPG-16 shoulder-launched anti-tank rocket-propelled grenade launcher, which is to be operated by two soldiers, RPKS light machine gun, and five AKMS assault rifles. It also carries portable launchers for 9M14M Malyutka missiles (9M111/9M113 missiles in BMD-1P).

=== Equipment ===
The vehicle has electric and manual bilge pumps, Gpk-S9 gyro-compass, engine pre-heater, TDA smoke-generating equipment, FTP-100M NBC system, R-123 transceiver, R-124 intercom and a centralized methyl bromide fire extinguishing system, the same as the one fitted to other former Soviet armoured vehicles.

== Service history ==
The BMD-1 entered serial production in 1968. It was produced by Volgograd Tractor Plant. Two airborne regiments of each airborne division were equipped with BMD-1 IFVs. Overall, each division operated 220 BMD-1 IFVs. It was displayed publicly for the first time during the Dvina exercise in the USSR in 1970. The BMD-1 was showcased for the second time during the Moscow Red Square parade in November 1973. Western governments originally classified the BMD-1 as a light tank before its true nature was known. Because of its small crew, the introduction of the BMD led to a reduction in the number of soldiers in an airborne battalion, from 610 to 316 men. The firepower of the BMD also meant that some of the battalion's integral fire support could be done away with. In 1973, the BMD-1 completely replaced the ASU-57 airborne assault guns in the Soviet airborne forces, increasing the firepower and maneuverability of the airborne division. Since 1977 a number of Soviet BMD-1 IFVs underwent a modernization to the BMD-1P standard.

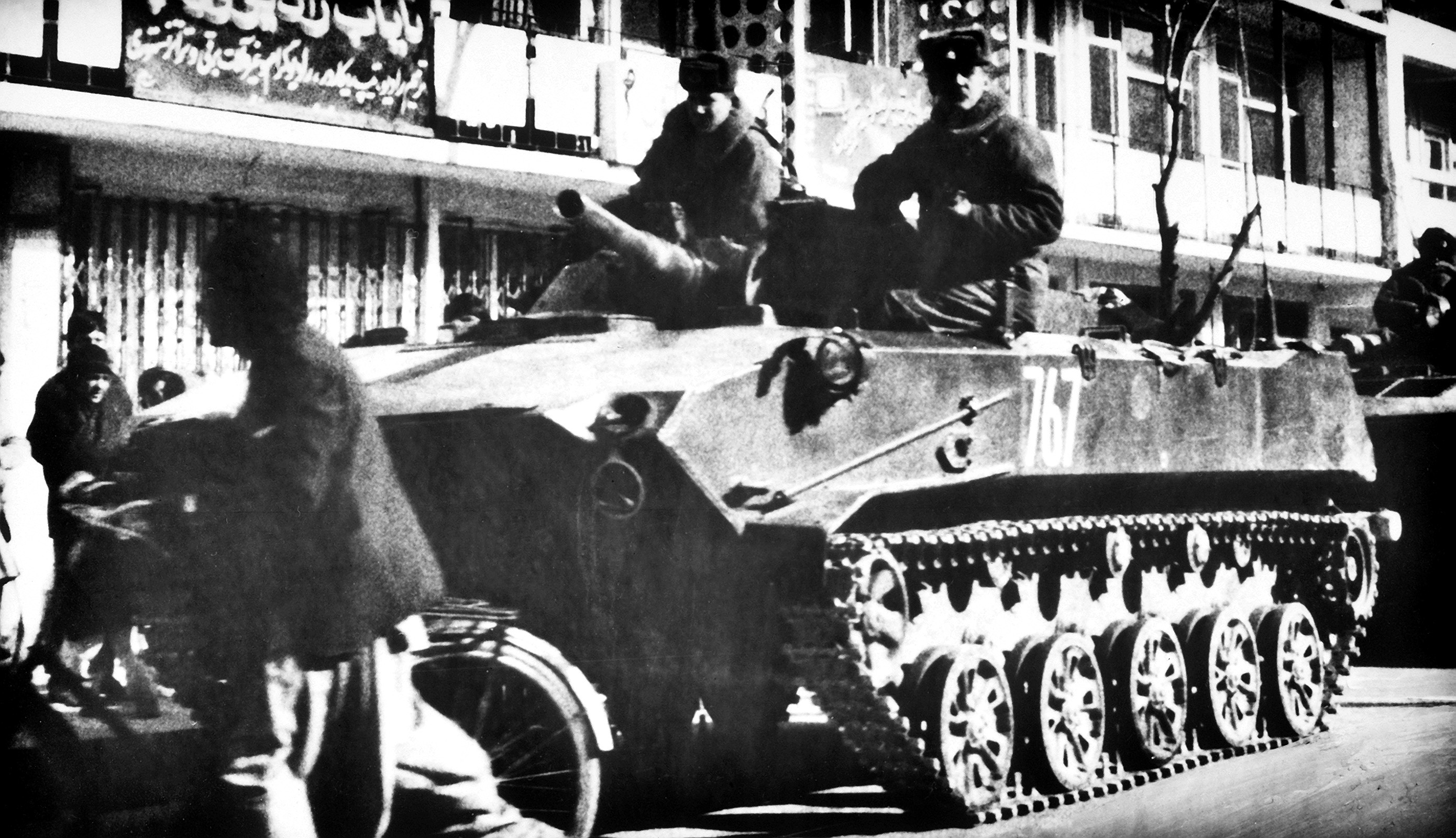
Soldiers ride on top of a BMD-1 in Kabul, Afghanistan, 25 March 1986.

=== Ogaden War ===
In 1978, a force of 70 Cuban Army BMD-1s and ASU-57s fighting on behalf of the Ethiopian government was airlifted by Mi-6 helicopters behind the lines of Somali forces holding the town of Jijiiga. This attack formed a pincer with a conventional Cuban armored push and routed the Somali forces in Ogaden.

=== Soviet–Afghan War ===
It was widely used by airborne units during Soviet–Afghan War. During the initial Soviet invasion of Afghanistan in 1979, BMD-1s of the Soviet 103rd Guards Airborne Division and 345th Separate Parachute Regiment were air landed by Il-76 transports into Kabul airport and Bagram Airfield, enabling the rapid seizure of critical cities and facilities throughout Afghanistan. The 56th Air Assault Brigade executed a similar capture of Kunduz. For the remainder of the Soviet occupation of Afghanistan through 1989, airborne forces under the 40th Army used BMD-1s as infantry fighting vehicles for transportation and fire support in operations against the mujahideen.

BMD-1 IFVs were not suited for fighting in the hot mountain regions of Afghanistan, as they were originally developed to provide airborne units with an IFV to give them a chance in engagements with enemy armour and allow them to operate in Nuclear-Biological-Chemical (NBC) warfare conditions. In Afghanistan, the main enemies were not AFVs but land mines and ambushes prepared by skillful Afghan Mujahideen armed with light anti-tank weapons, which meant that the BMD-1's anti-tank firepower was useless. Many BMD-1 IFVs and light APCs fell victim to Mujahideen attacks and antitank landmines. The Soviet Army lost 1,317 APCs and IFVs of all types during nine years of war in Afghanistan.

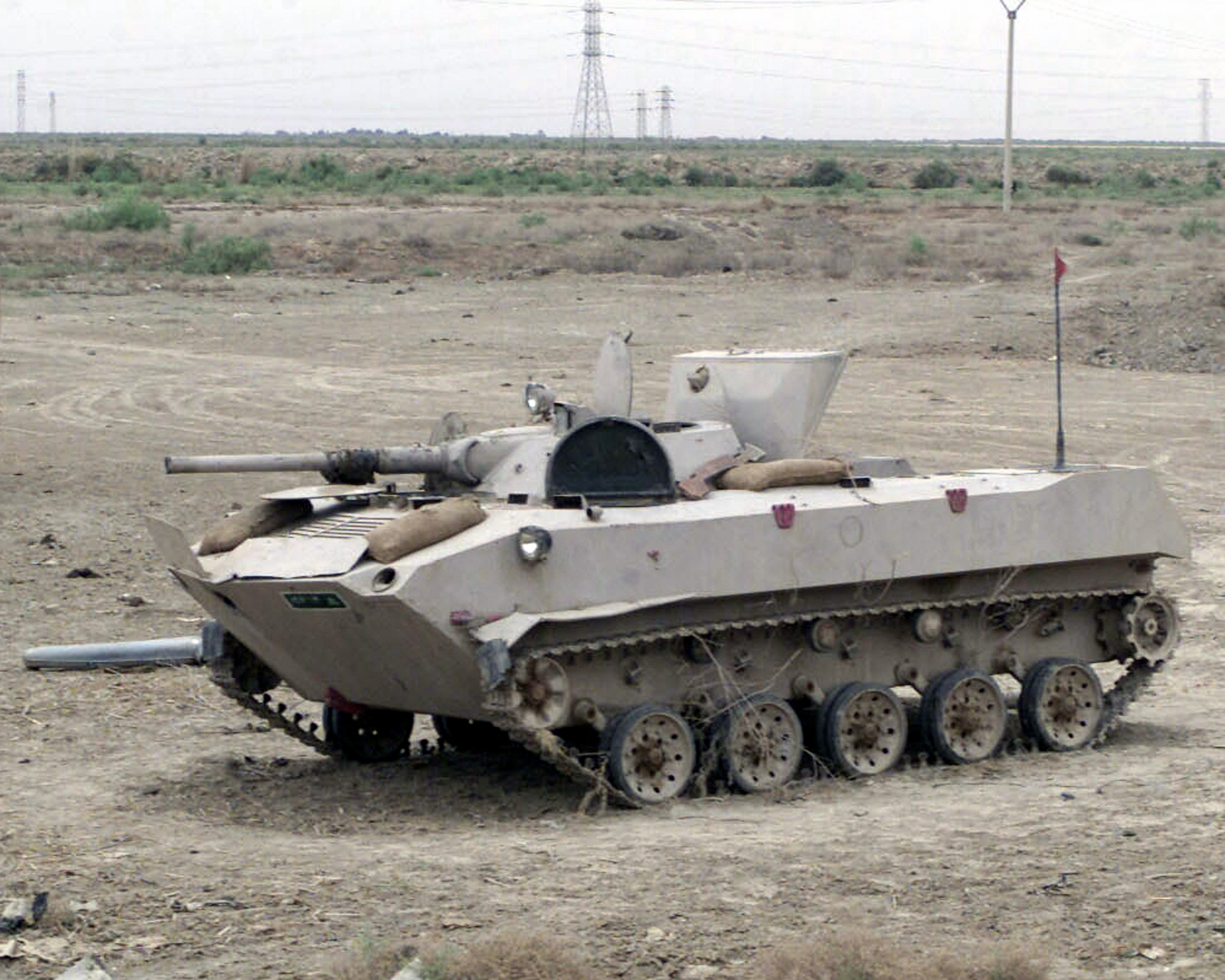
A destroyed Iraqi BMD-1 IFV during Operation Iraqi Freedom, 19 April 2003.

=== Iraq ===
Iraqi BMD-1s were deployed during the 2003 invasion of Iraq.

=== Former Yugoslavia ===
BMD-1 and BMD-1PK IFVs are used by the Russian airborne units in KFOR. BMD-1 IFVs were used by Russian airborne units in SFOR.

=== 2008 Georgia–Russia War ===
During the Russo-Georgian War, BMD-1s of the 104th Airborne Assault Regiment of the 76th Guards Air Assault Division advanced into South Ossetia and successfully engaged Georgian Army troops and vehicles. However, the BMD's visual and sighting equipment was criticized as being primitive.

=== 2014 Russo-Ukrainian War ===
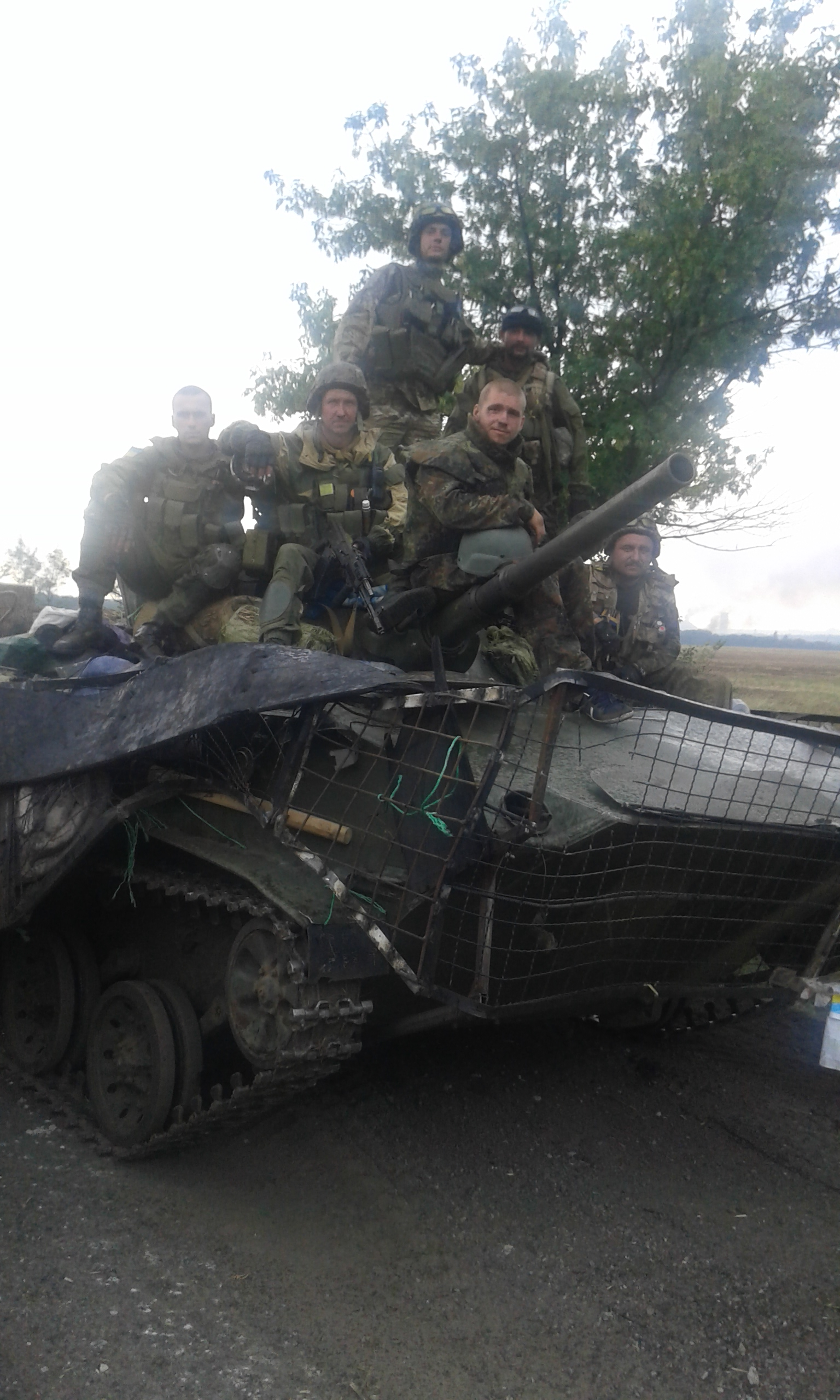
Ukrainian BMD-1 in 2015 following hostilities in the Donbas region.

During the Russo-Ukrainian War in 2014 in Eastern Ukraine, BMD-1s were used both by mechanized units of the Ukrainian Army and in smaller numbers by the separatists of the Donetsk People's Republic. It was claimed that a BMD-1 was one of the six armored vehicles in Separatist forces defending Sloviansk when it was besieged.

=== Present service ===
As of now, BMD-1 and vehicles based on it are used by the following units of Russian Airborne Troops or are stationed in following bases (this list does not include BTR-D APCs and BTR-D variants):

76th Guards Air Assault Division (CDO) from Pskov, which is part of Leningrad Military District (210 BMD vehicles as of 2000), the subunits of this division include 104th airborne regiment from Pskov (51 BMD-1) and 234th airborne regiment from Pskov (98 BMD-1).

98th Guards Airborne Division from Ivanovo (220 BMD vehicles as of 2000), the subunits of this division include 217th Guards Airborne Regiment from Ivanovo (109 BMD-1) and 331st airborne regiment from Kostroma (102 BMD-1).

106th Guards Airborne Division from Tula, which is a part of the Moscow Military District (306 BMD as of 2000), the subunits of this division include 51st airborne regiment from Tula (93 BMD-1) and 137th airborne regiment from Ryazan (10 BMD-1).

7th Guards Airborne Mountain Division CDO from Novorossyysk (190 BMD and BMP vehicles as of 2000), the subunits of this division include 108th Guards Air Assault Regiment from Novorossyysk (70 BMD-1) and 743rd commandos battalion from Novorossyysk (6 BMD-1).

31st Separate Airborne Brigade from Ul'yanovsk, which is a part of the Volga-Ural Military District (26 BMD-1 as of 2000).

Ryazan Higher Airborne Command School (51 BMD-1).

99th Internal Troops division from Rostov, Persianovka, which is a part of the North Caucasus Military District (4 BMD-1 and 33 BMD-1 IFVs in the Cherkmen regiment).

81st tank repair plant from Armavir (Krasnodar) (1 BMD-1).

=== Replacement ===
The Russian military was considering replacing the BMD series altogether with the GAZ-3937. This very lightweight wheeled armoured personnel carrier that incorporates plastic and carbon fibre in its construction, as well as aluminum. The GAZ-3937 can be air-dropped like the BMD, but is considerably lighter and less expensive to manufacture. Since the GAZ-3937 lacks the armor protection, cross-country mobility, and heavy armament of the BMD series, and is armed only with a 7.62 mm PKM machine gun in front of the commander's hatch, the BMD-4 (an upgraded BMD-3) has been selected for the future use of the Russian airborne and naval infantry. The BMD-4 uses the same 100 mm main gun with 30 mm autocannon and 7.62 mm medium machine gun turret on an improved, larger hull raising overall weight to the 15-ton class. The waterjet swim propulsion systems of the BMD-3/4 are strong enough to enable ship-to-shore transport, resulting in Russian naval infantry use.

== Variants ==
=== Former USSR ===
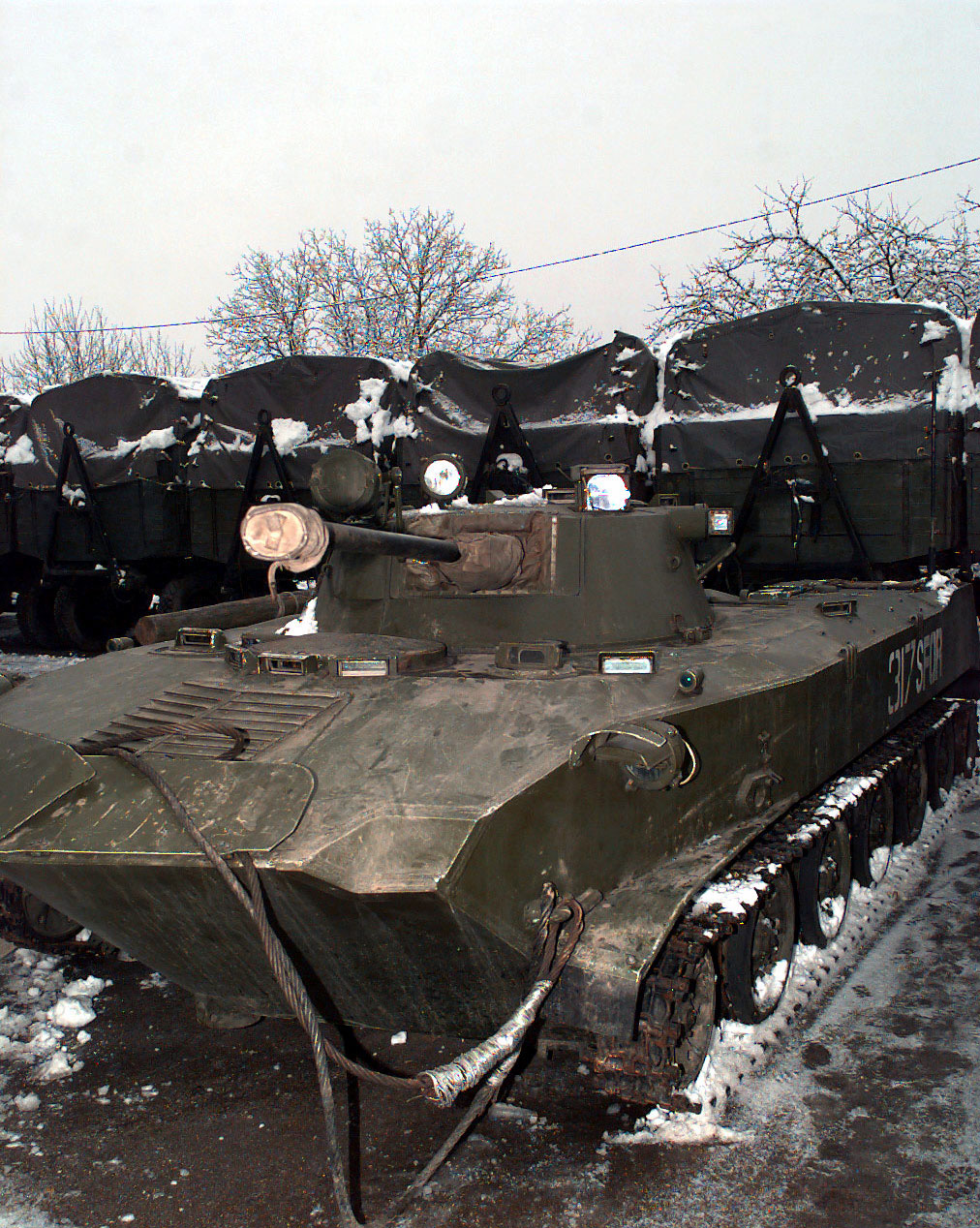
A Russian BMD-2 with SFOR markings parked in front of several trailer units at the Russian airborne brigade in Tojsici, Bosnia-Herzegovina, 1 January 1996.

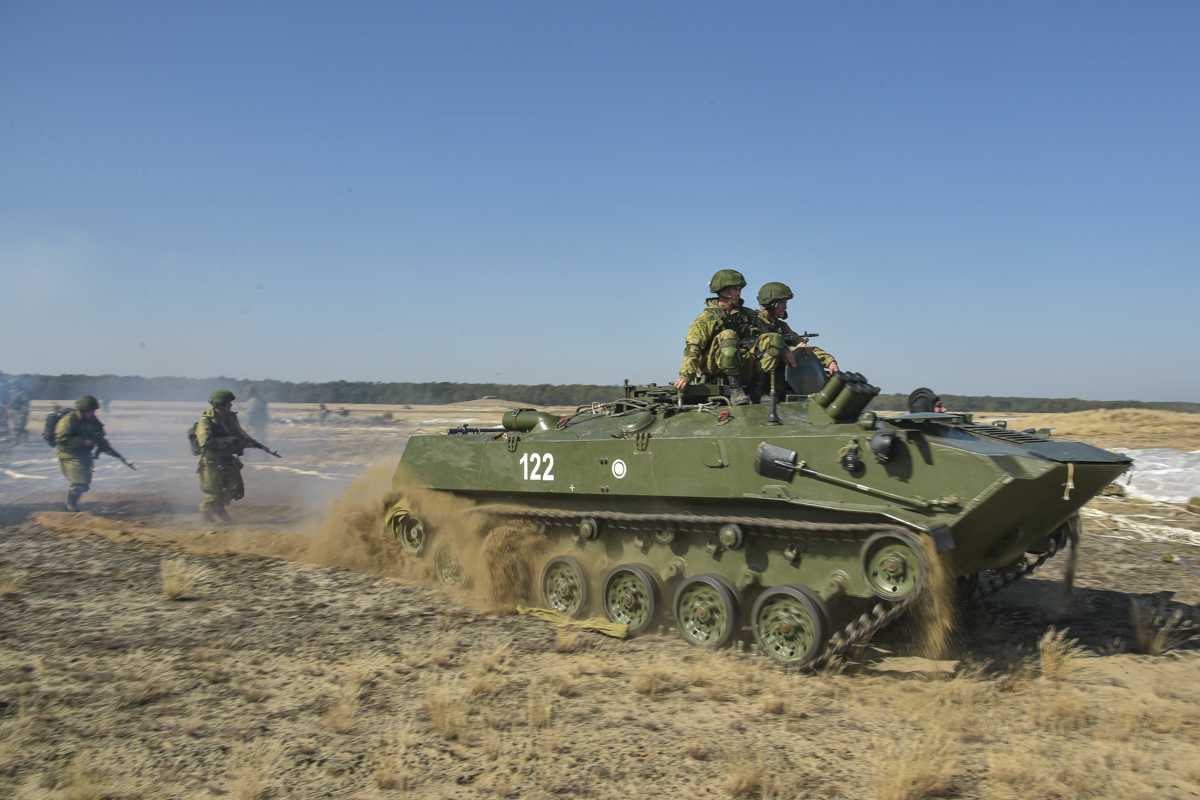
The turretless BTR-D variant with enlarged troop compartment with capacity for up to 10 dismounts including equipment.

- BMD – First production model.
  - BMD-1 (Ob'yekt 915) – Final production model. It has a dome-shaped NBC filter intake on the right hand side of the center of the hull roof.
    - BMD-1K (K stands for komandirskaya – command) – Command variant fitted with R-126 and R-107 transceivers, two clothes rail antennas and a generator box. It's sometimes called BMD-K.
    - BMD-1P – BMD-1 modernization with its 9S428 ATGM launcher replaced by pintle-mounted 9P135M-1 ATGM launcher capable of firing 9M113 "Konkurs" (AT-5 Spandrel), 9M113M "Konkurs-M" (AT-5B Spandrel B), 9M111 "Fagot" (AT-4 Spigot) and 9M111-2 "Fagot" (AT-4B Spigot B) ATGMs. Entered service in 1977.
      - BMD-1PK (K stands for komandirskaya – command) – Command variant of BMD-1P. It is fitted with an additional R-123M radio set, a generator, the GPK-59 gyroscopic compass, the PRKhR radiation and chemical reconnaissance unit and two attachable tables. The machine gun mounted in the left corner of the bow of the hull has been eliminated as well as one of the seats. The crew consists of 6 men. The ammo load was reduced by one 9M113 "Konkurs" (AT-5 Spandrel) ATGM and 250 7.62 mm machine gun rounds.
    - BMD-1M – BMD-1 with smoke grenade launchers on the rear of the turret, improved ventilation and road wheels.
    - BMD-1 with its 73 mm 2A28 "Grom" main gun replaced by 30 mm autocannon.
    - BMD-1 with its 73 mm 2A28 "Grom" main gun replaced by 30 mm AGS-17 "Plamya" automatic grenade launcher.
    - BMD-1 converted into a mortar carrier.
    - BMD-1 with turret mounted 2B9 Vasilek mortar.
    - BMD-1 converted into a self-propelled multiple rocket launcher. The armament was removed and replaced by a vision device. Fitted on top of the turret is a small box-type launcher for 12×80 mm rockets.
    - BMD-2 (Object 916) – BMD-1 variant with a new one-man turret armed with stabilized 30 mm 2A42 multi-purpose autocannon and 7.62 mm PKT coaxial tank machine gun (mounted on the right hand side of the main gun). The vehicle carries 300 rounds for the main gun (180 AP and 120 HE) and 2,940 rounds for the machine gun. The gun has a maximum elevation of 75° and can be used to fire at air targets. The turret is also armed with pintle-mounted 9P135M launcher, on the right hand side of the roof of the turret, with semi-automatic control capable of firing SACLOS guided 9M113 "Konkurs" (AT-5 Spandrel) and 9M113M "Konkurs-M" (AT-5B Spandrel B) ATGMs. The new turret seats the gunner on the left hand side of the main gun. On top of the turret there's one single piece circular hatch opening to the front. Located in front of the said hatch is the gunner's sight which is the same one as the one used in BMP-2. Another gunner's sight is located on the left hand side of the main gun and moves in vertical planes along with it. It is a high angle of fire sight used when the gunner is aiming at air targets. The vehicle also has additional periscopes that provide it with vision on the sides. A white searchlight is mounted in front of the turret. The amount of bow mounted tank machine guns decreased from two to one. The right hand side bow mounted machine gun was preserved. NATO gave it the designation BMD M1981/1.
    - BTR-D (Object 925) (bronyetransportyor) – Lengthened variant (with 6 rather than 5 road wheels), slightly up-armoured at the front. The BTR-D has no turret, but is armed with two bow-mounted machine guns PKB and can be fitted with pintle-mounted automatic grenade launchers (AGS-17, AGS-30 or AGS-57) and/or machine guns (PKM, 6P41, "Utyos" or "Kord"). Entered service in 1974 and can carry 10 passengers. Combat weight: 8.5 tons.

2S2 Fialka

- 2S2 Fialka (Object 924) – Prototype airborne self-propelled gun designed by I. V. Gabalov.

=== Belarus ===
- BMD-1 fitted with 2A42 Cobra overhead mount modular one-man turret.

=== Russia ===
- BMD-1 modernization fitted with TKB-799 "Kliver" one-man weapons station developed by Tula Instrument Engineering Design Bureau (KBP). It is armed with a missile pod, a 30 mm 2A72 multipurpose autocannon (it can be used against both ground targets and air targets) and a 7.62 mm PKTM coaxial general purpose machine gun. The missile pod is mounted on the right side of the weapons station and normally holds four 9M133 Kornet (AT-14 Spriggan) or 9M133F "Kornet" ATGMs with laser jam-resistant fire control system but these can be removed and replaced by a pod of 9K38 Igla (SA-18 Grouse) surface-to-air missiles. It carries 300 rounds for the main gun, 2000 rounds for PKTM machine gun and 4 ATGMs. It also has a modern computerized fire control system with two-plane stabilizer, 1K13-2 telescopic sight with distance measurement/thermal/laser channels and ballistic calculator with external sensors.

== Operators ==
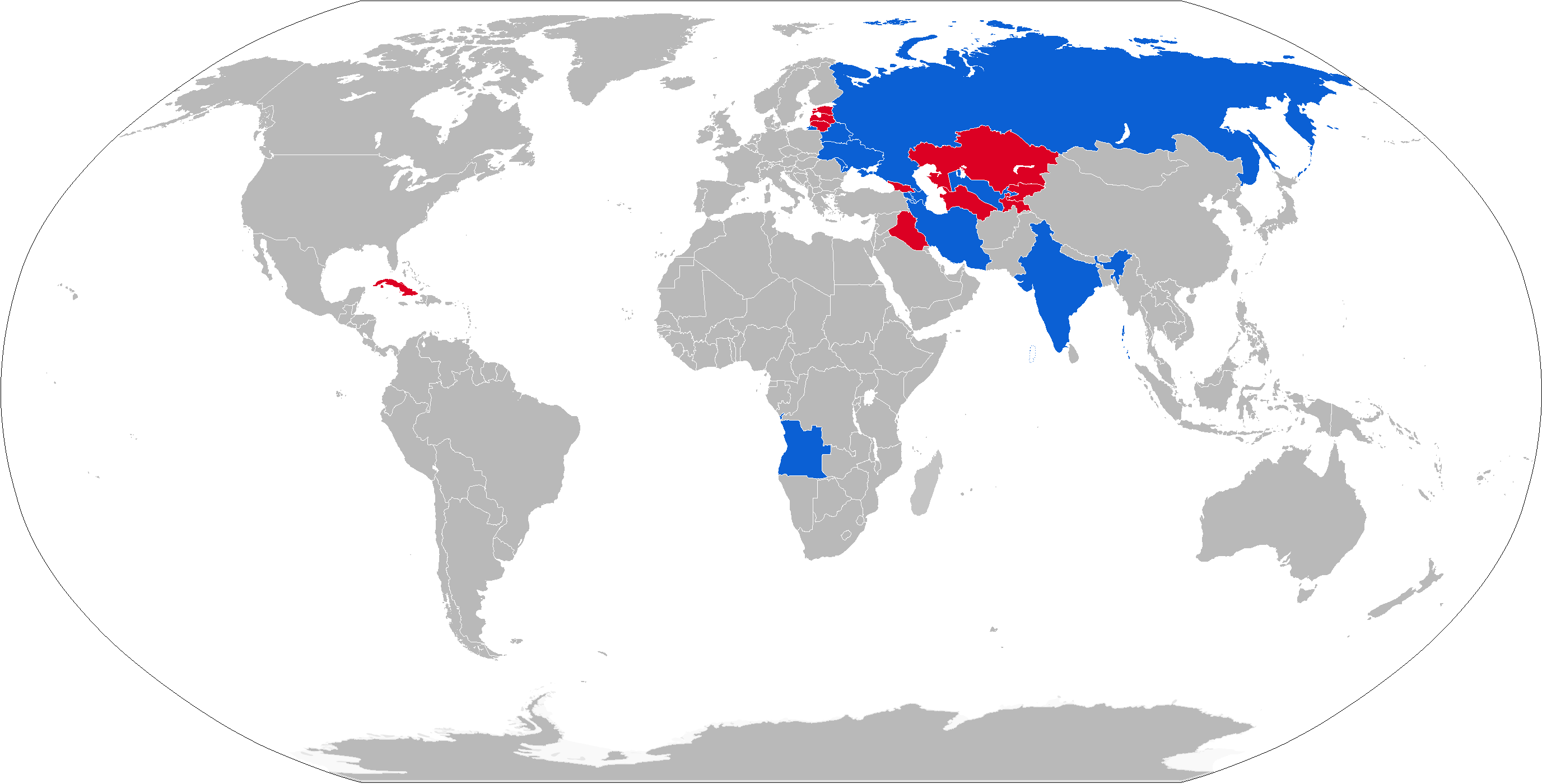
Operators: Current Former

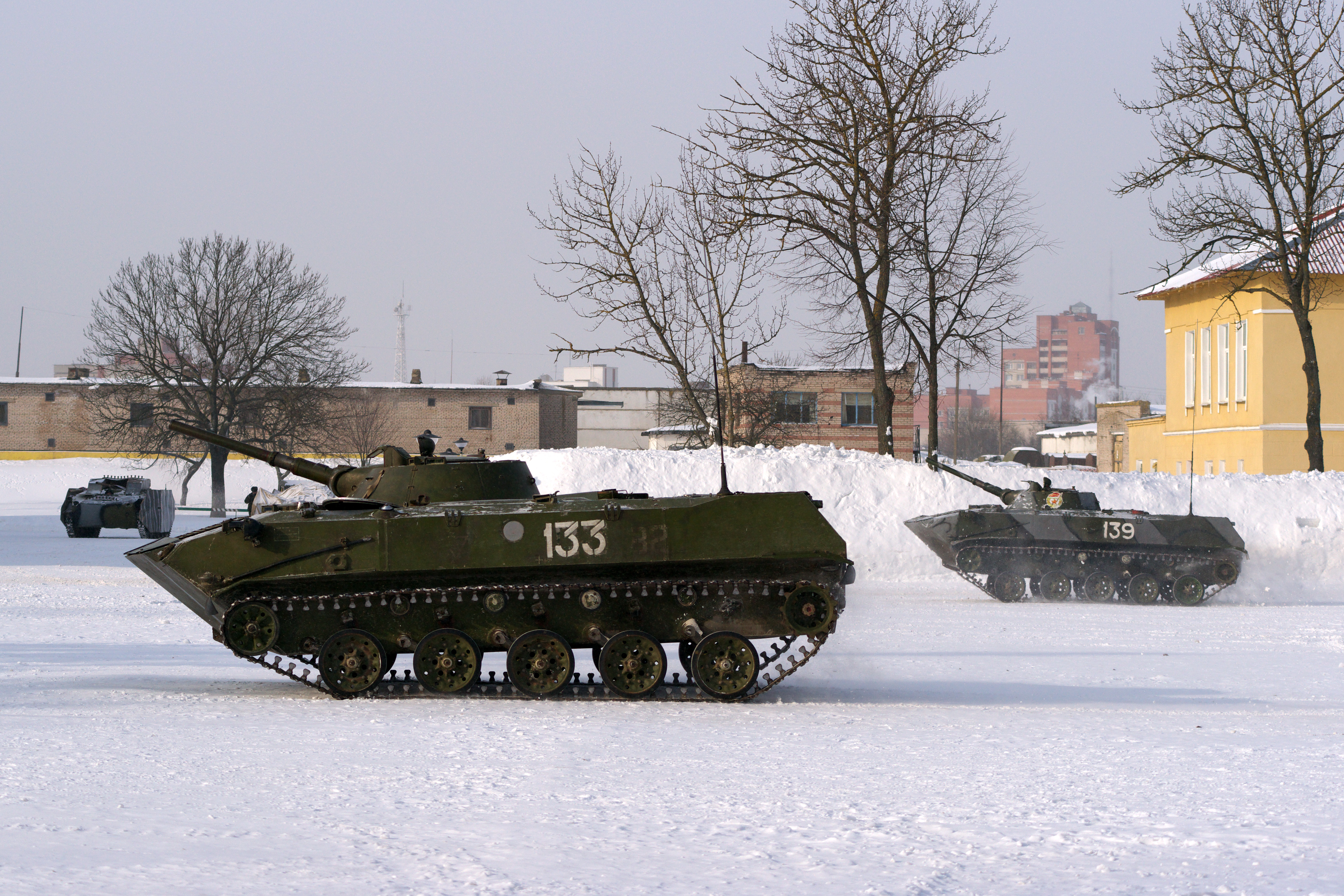
BMD-1 of 103rd Mobile Brigade, Belarus

=== Current operators ===
- Armenia: 10 as of 2026; in service with Armenian army and border guards.
- Azerbaijan: 20 in service as of 2026.
- Cuba: Some in service as of 2026.
- Moldova: 44 BMD-1 in service as of 2026.
- Russia: Retired in favour of BMD-2, 150 BMD-1 in storage as of 2026.
- Turkmenistan: 8 BMD-1 in service as of 2024.
- Uzbekistan: 120 BMD-1 in service as of 2024.

=== Former operators ===
- Angola: 10 received from Soviet Union in 1988.
- Belarus: some may remain in reserve storage.
- Ethiopia: 35 received from Soviet Union in 1977.
- India
- Iraq: 25 received from Soviet Union in 1981.
- Soviet Union
- Ukraine: An unspecified number inherited from the Soviet Union. 20 in service as recently as 2023, though serviceability was doubtful.

== See also ==
- BMP Development
- BMD-2
- BMD-3
- BTR-D
- BMP-1
- BMP-2
- BMP-3
- List of AFVs
- VDV – Russian Armed Forces airborne combat arm
- 2A28 Grom – Main gun on the BMP-1 and BMD-1 infantry fighting vehicles
