= Yakovlev Pchela =

Russian UAV

Pchela
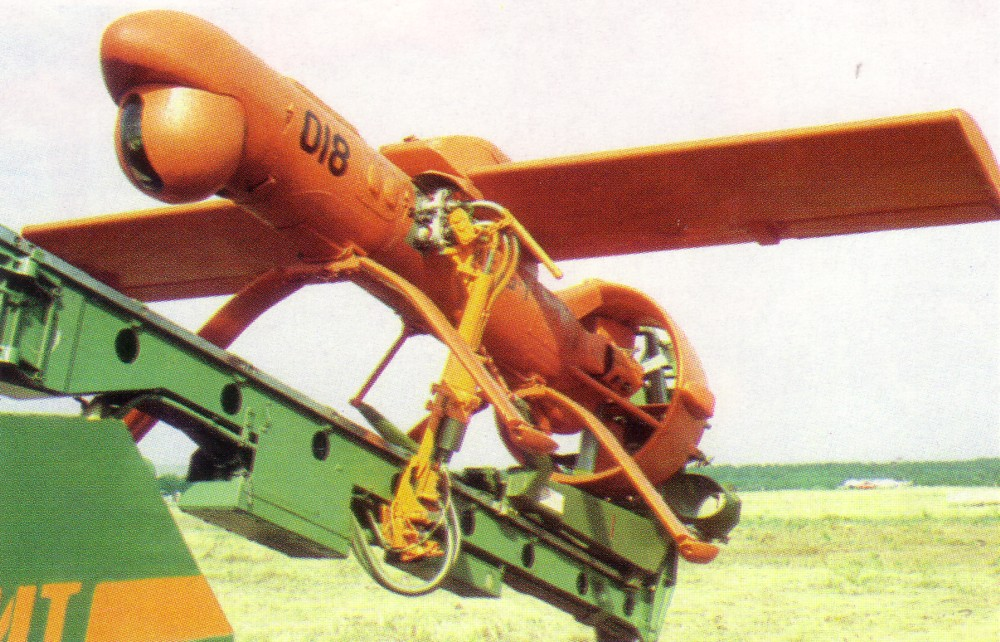
- Pchela-1T UAV on a starting ramp (closeup view)

General information
- Type: Unmanned air vehicle
- National origin: Soviet Union/Russia
- Manufacturer: Yakovlev
- Primary user: Russian Air Force

History
- First flight: 1986

The Yakovlev Pchela-1T ("Пчела" meaning bee) is an unmanned aerial vehicle (UAV) manufactured by the Russian Yakovlev Design Bureau. Its primary use is for surveillance and observation in battlefield environments with downlinked video. Other implementations and uses include target designation and as a training target.

== Design ==
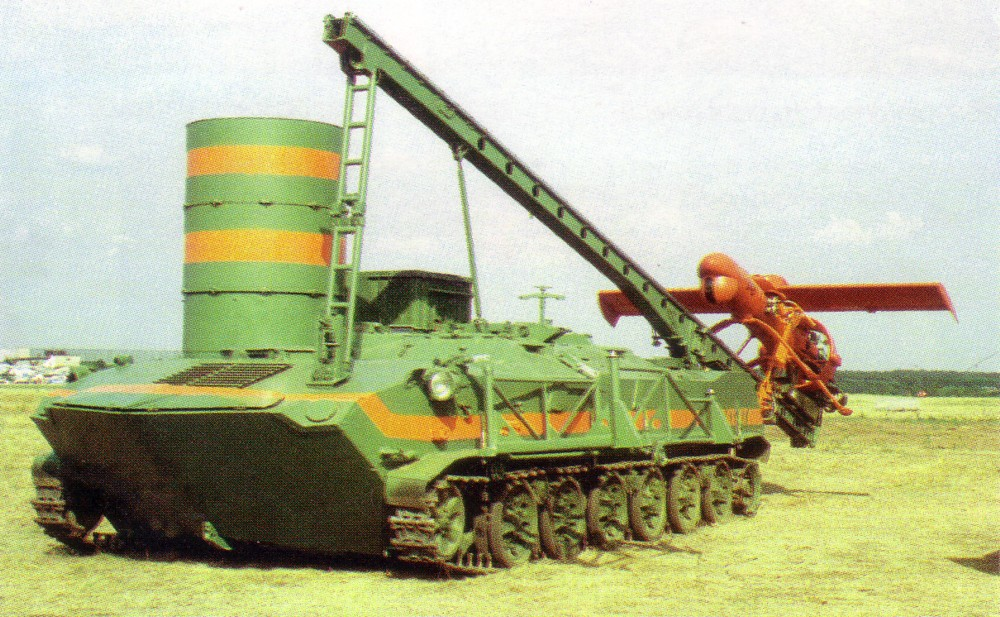
Pchela-1T UAV on a BTR-D launcher

The Pchela is launched using rocket assist by two solid-propellant booster rocket engines, and it is recovered via parachute. The Pchela-1T has a range of 60 km (37 mi), flies at 100–2,500 m (330–8,200 ft) altitude at 120–180 km/h (75–112 mph). The maximum takeoff weight for the vehicle is 138 kg (304 lb). Yakovlev lists the vehicle endurance at two hours.

== Operators ==
- Russia
- North Korea

== Former Operators ==
- Soviet Union
