= BTR-D =

Soviet armoured personnel carrier

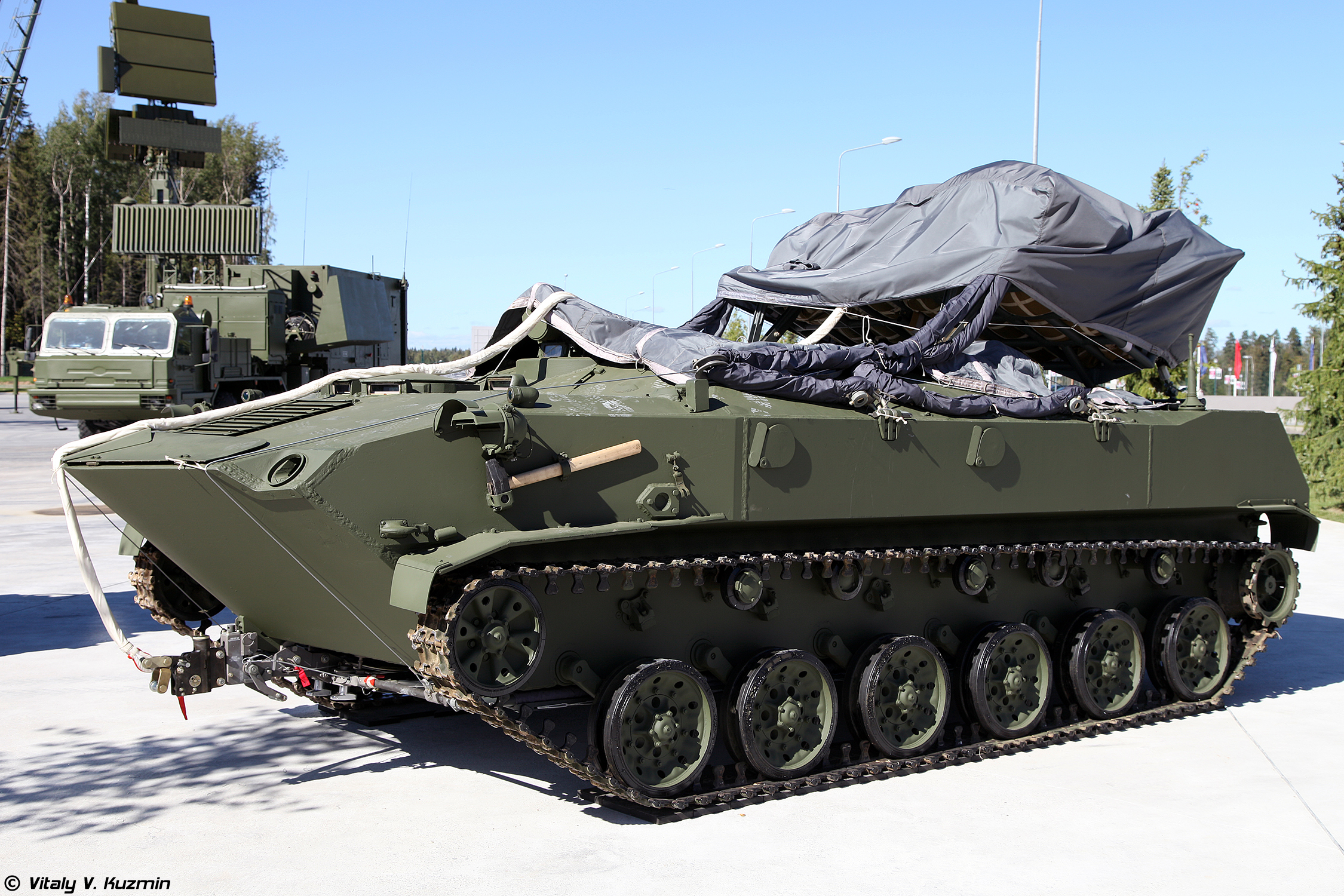
- BTR-D with parachute landing equipment
- Type: Airborne Amphibious Multi-Purpose Tracked Armoured Personnel Carrier
- Place of origin: Soviet Union/Russia

Service history
- In service: 1974–present
- Used by: See Operators
- Wars: Soviet–Afghan War; Transnistrian War; First Chechen War; Second Chechen War; Russo-Ukrainian war

Production history
- Designer: Volgograd Tractor Factory
- Designed: Early 1970–1974
- Manufacturer: Volgograd Tractor Factory
- Produced: 1974 – ? (out of production)
- Variants: See Variants

Specifications (BTR-D)
- Mass: 8 tonnes 8.5 tonnes (combat weight)
- Length: 6.74 m (22.1 ft)
- Width: 2.94 m
- Height: 1.67 m
- Crew: 3 (commander, driver and bow machine gunner) (+ 10 troops)
- Armor: 15 mm at 78° upper hull front
- Main armament: Pintle-mounted automatic grenade launchers (AGS-17, AGS-30 or AGS-57) and/or machine guns (PKM, 6P41, "Utyos","Kord"or”(Type 920G Tucha 81 mm smoke grenade launching system)”.
- Secondary armament: 2×7.62 mm PKB bow general purpose machine guns (2,000 rounds)
- Engine: 5D-20 6-cylinder 4-stroke V-shaped liquid cooled 15.9-litre diesel 245 hp (180 kW) at 2,600 rpm
- Power/weight: 30.1 hp/tonne (22.5 kW/tonne); 28.4 hp/tonne (21.3 kW/tonne) (loaded with equipment)
- Suspension: torsion-bar
- Ground clearance: Adjustable; 100 mm to 450 mm
- Fuel capacity: 300 l
- Operational range: 500 km (road); 116 km (water)
- Maximum speed: 61 km/h (road); 35 km/h (cross country); 10 km/h (swimming)

The BTR-D is a Soviet airborne multi-purpose tracked armoured personnel carrier. It was introduced in 1974 and first seen by the West in 1979 during the Soviet–Afghan War. BTR-D stands for Bronetransportyor Desanta (БТР-Д, Бронетранспортер Десанта, literally "Armored personnel carrier of the Airborne Forces"). It is based on the BMD-1 airborne IFV. NATO gave it the designation BMD M1979.

== Development history ==
In 1969, the BMD-1 airborne IFV entered service with the Soviet Army. The vehicle had many flaws including the armour that could be pierced by .50 cal machine guns or even heavy small arms fire from the sides and the troop compartment was extremely cramped and could only transport up to four infantrymen. This number was often reduced to three because it was impractical for four infantrymen to operate inside the troop compartment and dismount from the vehicle.

At the beginning of the 1970s, the Volgograd Tractor Factory design bureau, who designed the BMD-1, began designing a new airborne APC based on the BMD-1. The prototype was completed in 1974. The same year it entered production and service with the Soviet Army as the BTR-D.

== Description ==
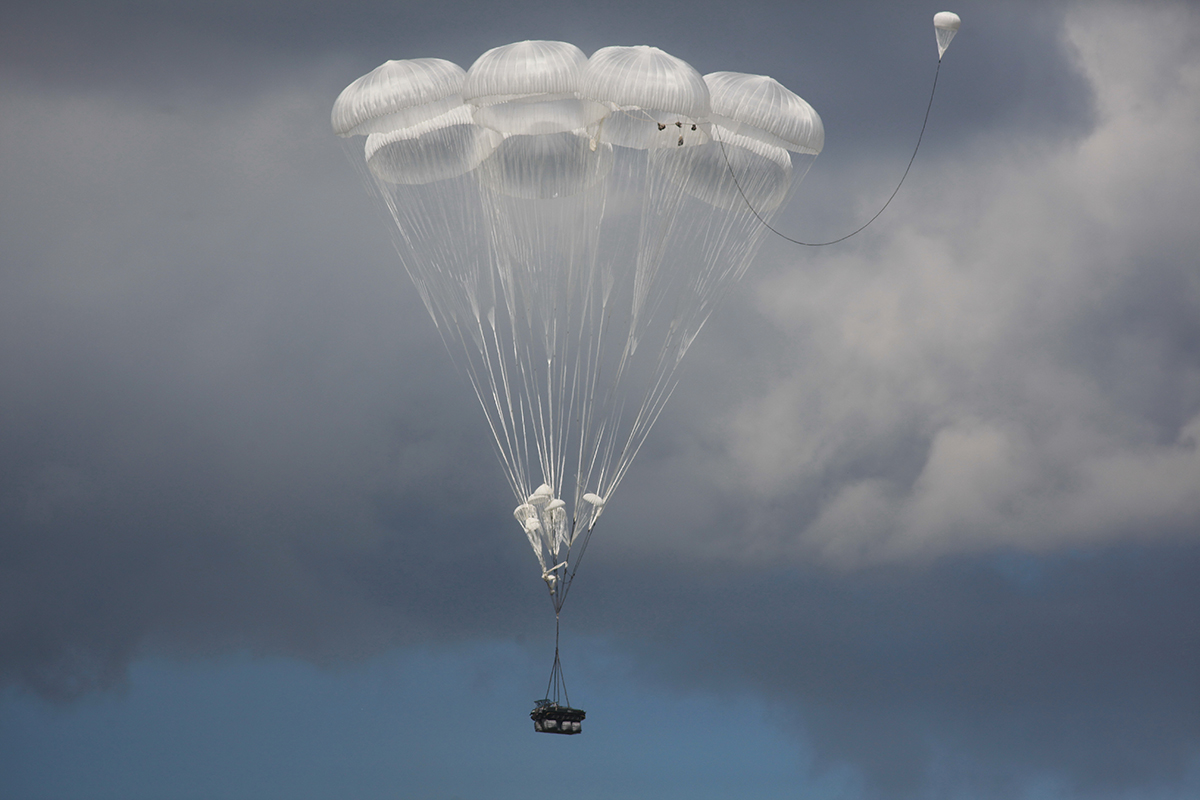
Airborne operations demonstrating full deployment of the parachute system and underslung BTR-D.

=== Overview ===
While the BTR-D is based on the BMD-1, it is 60 cm longer and lacks a turret. Instead, it has a small flat superstructure with a hatch on top.

=== Crew ===
The crew consists of the driver, the commander and the left bow mounted machine gun gunner, all of whom are in the same positions and have the same equipment as in the BMD-1.

=== Armament ===
The turret with all of the main armament was removed. The two bow mounted machine guns were retained. The original PKT tank machine guns were replaced by PKB general purpose machine guns. The vehicle can also be fitted with pintle-mounted automatic grenade launchers (AGS-17, AGS-30 or AGS-57) and/or machine guns (PKM, 6P41 "Pecheneg", NSV-127 "Utyos" or 6P49 "Kord").

=== Maneuverability ===
The BTR-D is powered by the same engine as the BMD-1. Its suspension is longer because the entire vehicle has been lengthened by 60cm. Because of this, the vehicle has six roadwheels on each side instead of five. It has five return rollers on each side unlike the BMD-1, which has four.

=== Armour protection ===
The armour protection is slightly better on the BTR-D than on the BMD-1 due to the upper front armour having a dual slanted angle.

=== Troop compartment ===
With the turret removed, the troop compartment was enlarged and can carry up to ten equipped soldiers. It's also linked with the crew compartment in the front. There are two firing ports in the sides and one in the rear, two of which are for RPK-74 light machine guns.

=== Equipment ===
The BTR-D has all the same equipment as the BMD-1, with added towing equipment for a ZU-23-2 twin AA autocannon.

== Service history ==
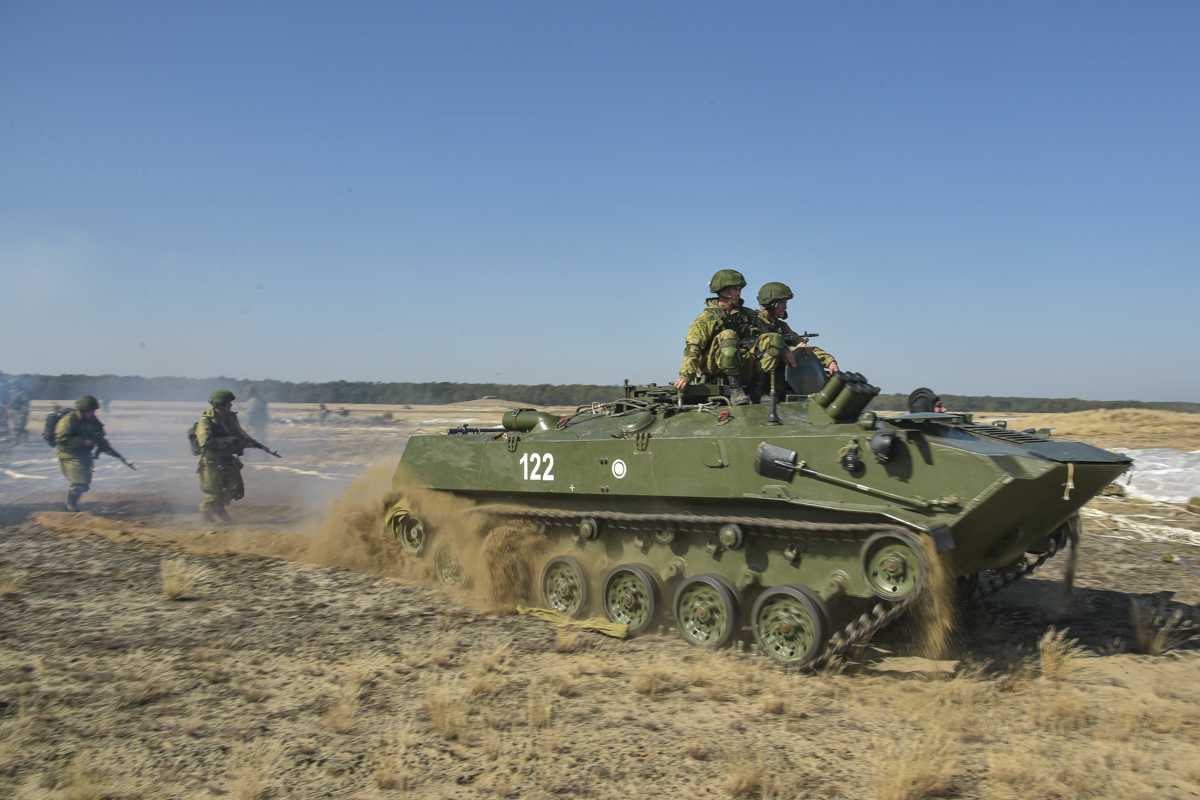
BTR-D with dismounted infantry (the vehicle can carry up to 10 fully equipped troops plus crew).

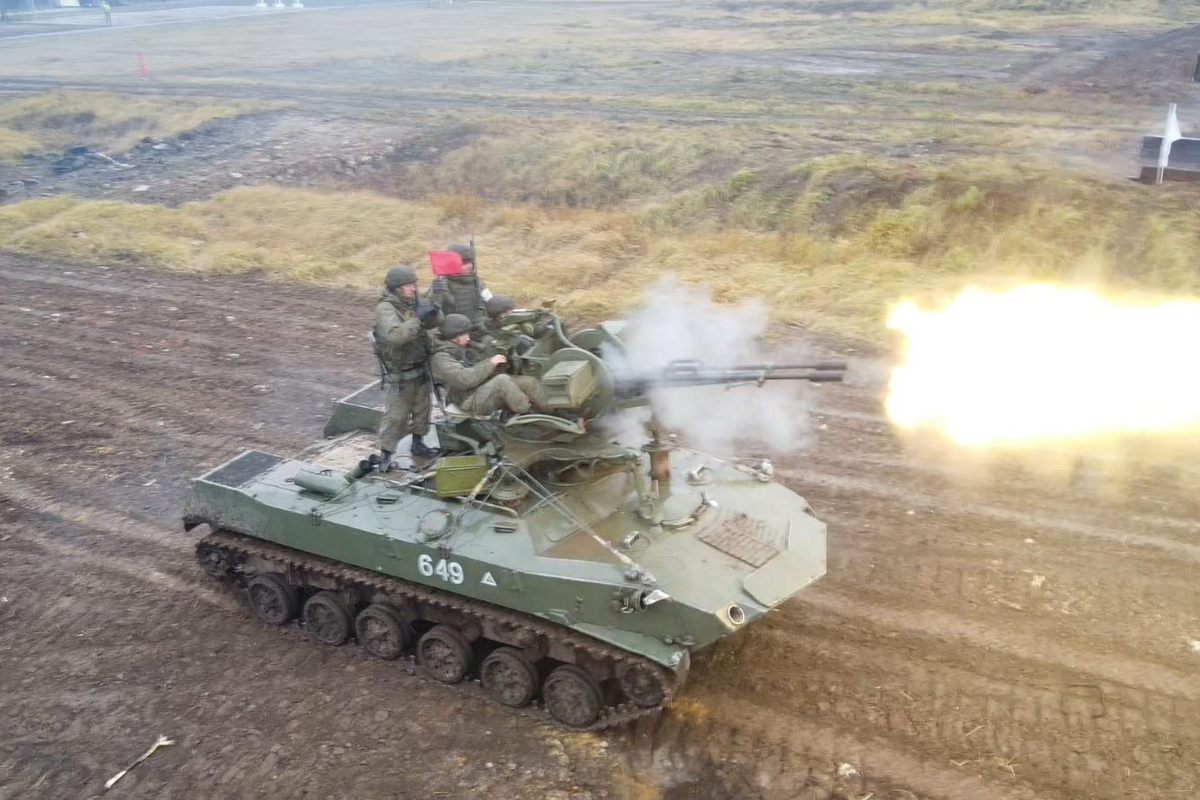
BTR-ZD anti-aircraft variant which has additional internal storage for MANPADS and has mounting points to strap a ZU-23-2 automatic cannon (pictured).

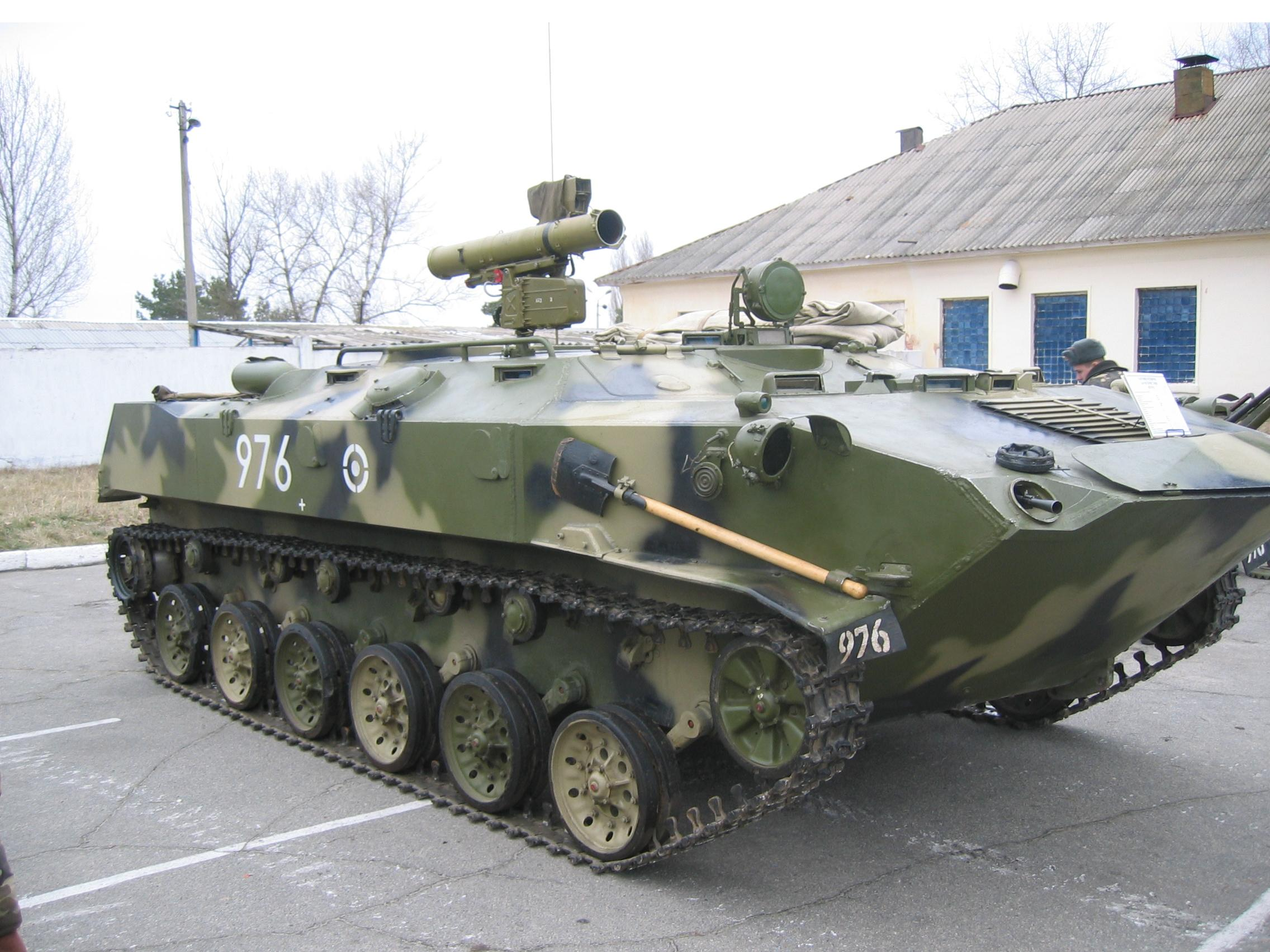
Armed Forces of Ukraine tank destroyer modification which features a pintle-mounted 9M113 Konkurs guided missile launcher and internal storage racks for additional missile containers.

The BTR-D entered service with the Soviet Army in 1974. It was used by Soviet airborne troops during the Soviet–Afghan War, where it was seen for the first time by the West in 1979.

As of now, the BTR-D and vehicles based upon it are used by the following units of the Russian Army or are stationed in following bases:

- 76th Guards Air Assault Division from Pskov, which is part of Western Military District (90 BTR vehicles, 30 BTR-RD and 49 BTR-ZD as of 2000), the subunits of this division include

104th airborne regiment from Pskov (34 BTR-D, 6 BTR-RD, 13 BTR-ZD and 6 BMD-1KSh)
234th airborne regiment from Pskov (32 BTR-D, 6 BTR-RD, 12 BTR-ZD and 5 BMD-1KSh)
1140th artillery regiment from Pskov (14 BTR-RD, 3 BTR-ZD, 1 BMD-1KSh and 18 2S9 Anona)
165th independent air defense division from Pskov (4 BTR-ZD and 1 BMD-1KSh)
656th independent engineer battalion from Pskov (8 BTR-D and 1 BMD-1KSh)
728th independent communications battalion from Pskov (2 BTR-D, 6 BMD-1KSh, 3 BMD-1R and 2 R-440-ODB )
7th independent repair battalion from Pskov (2 BTR-D).

- 98th Guards Airborne Division from Ivanovo (92 BTR vehicles, 27 BTR-RD and 38 BTR-ZD as of 2000), the subunits of this division include

217th airborne regiment from Ivanovo (32 BTR-D, 6 BTR-RD, 11 BTR-ZD, 7 BMD-1KSh and 1 BMD-1R)
331st airborne regiment from Kostroma (33 BTR-D, 6 BTR-RD, 15 BTR-ZD, 5 BMD-1KSh and 1 BMD-1R)
1065th artillery regiment from Kostroma (15 BTR-RD, 3 BTR-ZD and 2 BMD-1KSh)
318th independent air defense division from Ivanovo (4 BTR-D, 8 BTR-ZD and 1 BMD-1KSh)
661st independent engineer battalion from Ivanovo (7 BTR-D and 1 BMD-1KSh)
674th independent communications battalion from Pskov (2 BTR-D, 6 BMD-1KSh, 4 BMD-1R and 3 R-440-ODB )
15th independent repair battalion from Pskov (7 BTR-D).

- 106th Guards Airborne Division from Tula which is a part of the Western Military District (132 BTR vehicles, 33 BTR-RD and 49 BTR-ZD as of 2000), the subunits of this division include

51st airborne regiment from Tula (32 BTR-D, 6 BTR-RD, 13 BTR-ZD, 2 BMD-1KSh and 1 BMD-1R)
137th airborne regiment from Ryazan (38 BTR-D, 6 BTR-RD, 13 BTR-ZD, 7 BMD-1KSh and 1 BMD-1R)
1182nd artillery regiment from Yefremov (4 BTR-D, 3 BTR-ZD, 2 BMD-1KSh and 18 2S9 Anona)
107th independent air defense division from Donskoy (18 BTR-D, 6 BTR-ZD and 1 BMD-1KSh)
332nd independent engineer battalion from Tula (8 BTR-D and 1 BMD-1KSh)
731st independent communications battalion from Tula (2 BTR-D, 6 BMD-1KSh, 5 BMD-1R and 2 R-440-ODB )
15th independent repair battalion from Tula (4 BTR-D and 1 BREM-D).

- 7th Guards Mountain Air Assault Division from Novorossyysk, Southern Military District (121 BTR vehicles, 27 BTR-RD, 38 BTR-ZD and 55 2S9 Anona as of 2000), the subunits of this division include

108th airborne regiment from Novorossyysk (35 BTR-D, 9 BTR-RD, 13 BTR-ZD, 7 BMD-1KSh and 19 2S9 Anona)
247th CDO regiment from Stavropol' (26 BTR-D, 9 BTR-RD and 13 BTR-ZD)
1141st artillery regiment from Anapa (5 BTR-D and 9 BTR-ZD)
30th independent air defense division from Novorossyysk (4 BTR-D and 8 BTR-ZD)
629th independent engineer battalion from Starotitarovskaya (8 BTR-D)
743rd independent communications battalion from Novorossyysk (2 BTR-D, 8 BMD-1KSh and 3 R-440-ODB)
6th independent repair battalion from Novorossyysk (4 BTR-D and 1 BREM-D).

- 31st independent airborne brigade from Ul'yanovsk which is a part of the Central Military District (57 BTR-D, 24 BTR-RD, 19 BTR-ZD, 8 BMD-1KSh and 2 BMD-1R as of 2000).
- 45th independent Spetsnaz regiment from Kubinka, Moscow (1 BTR-D).
- Ryazan airborne troops institute (6 BTR-D, 5 BTR-RD, 2 BTR-ZD and 2 BMD-1KSh).

== Variants ==
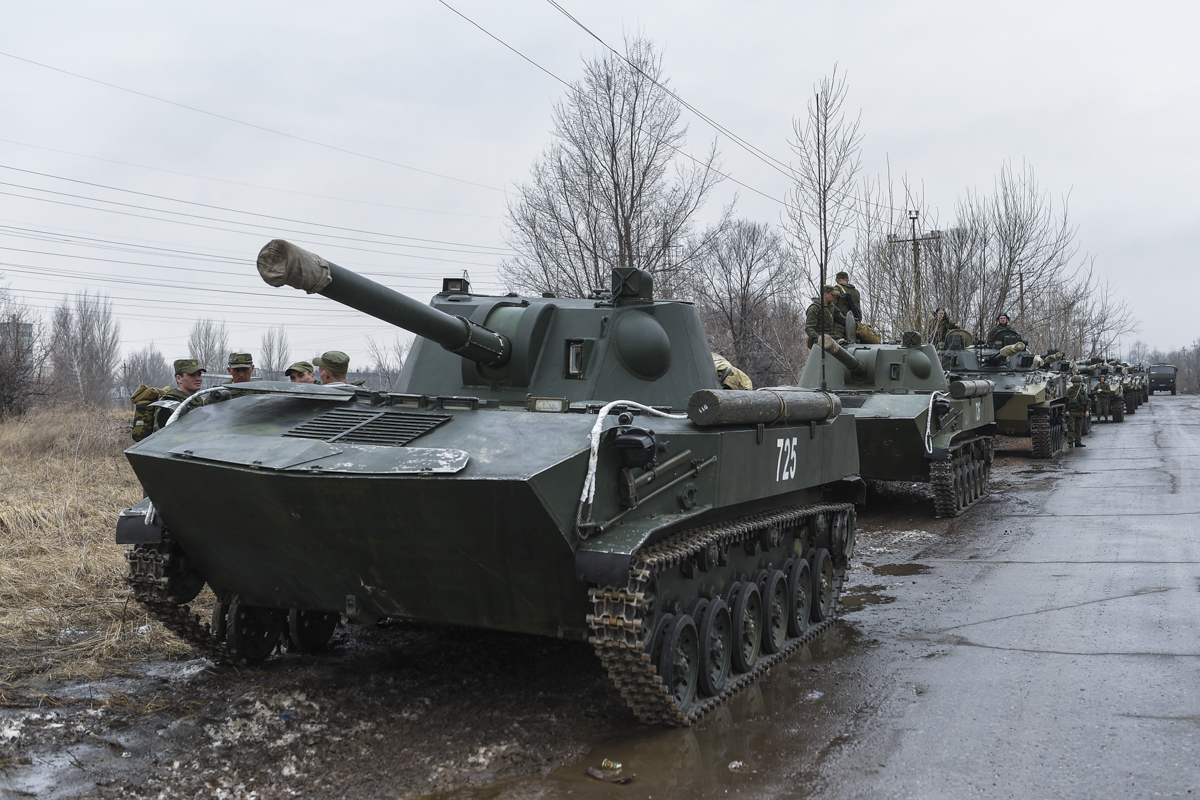
120 mm self-propelled mortar 2S9 Nona-S.

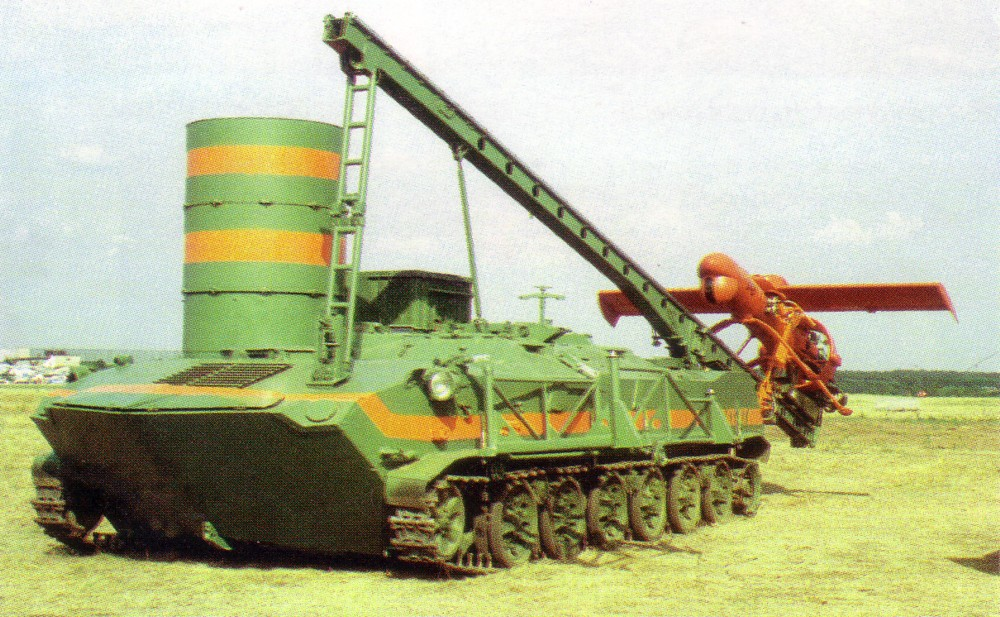
A NPDU "Sterkh".

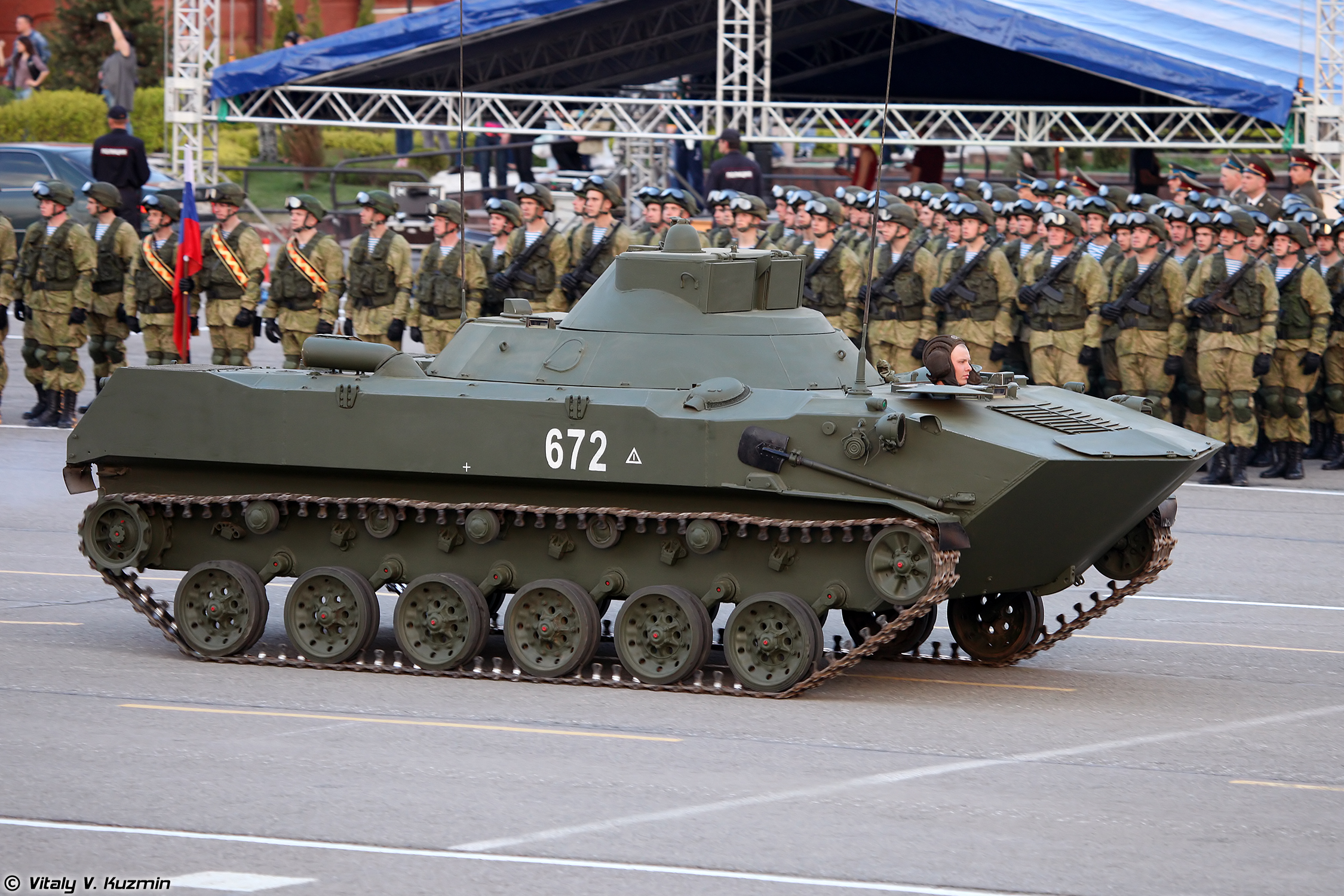
The 1V119 Reostat artillery command and control vehicle in Russian service, 2017.

- BTR-D (Ob'yekt 925) – Basic model.
  - BTR-DG (Ob'yekt 925G) – Cargo variant without bow machine guns, firing ports and periscopes. The troop compartment was modified to serve as a cargo compartment.
    - BTR-DG converted into an airborne SPAAG fitted with a specially built three-legged ZU-23-2 twin anti-aircraft autocannon mount over the roof of the cargo compartment.
  - BTR-D San – A BTR-D converted into an airborne armoured ambulance.
  - BREM-D (BREM-D stands for bronirovannaya remonto-evakuatsionnaya mashina desanta – armoured maintenance-recovery vehicle of the airborne) (Ob'yekt 932) – A BTR-D converted into an airborne ARV. It carries specialized equipment for the repair and recovery of BMD-1 type vehicles. This equipment includes a light collapsible crane stored on the roof of the personnel compartment, which can be traversed through 180°, a recovery winch, a combination spade and dozer blade, a generator, towing equipment, electric welding system, tools and ready use spares. One of the 7.62 mm bow PKT tank machine guns was eliminated. This entered service in 1989 in very small numbers.
  - BTR-RD "Robot" – A BTR-D converted into an airborne ATGM team carrier with two 9P135M-1 ATGM launchers capable of firing 9M113 Konkurs (AT-5 Spandrel), 9M113M Konkurs-M (AT-5B Spandrel B), 9K111 Fagot (AT-4 Spigot) and 9K111-2 Fagot (AT-4B Spigot B) ATGMs. They can be used by the dismounted ATGM squad or fitted on a pintle mount on the right side of the hull. This is basically a BTR-D with a pintle mount added and with missile racks inside the troop compartment.
  - BTR-ZD "Skrezhet" (ZD stands for Zenitnaya, Desantirymaya) – A converted into an airborne air defense vehicle for carrying two MANPAD teams. The vehicle is fitted with racks for spare MANPAD missiles. It is fitted with external stowage rails for a MANPAD on the right hand side of the roof of the troop compartment. It can carry a complete ZU-23-2 twin anti-aircraft autocannon mount on the roof of the troop compartment.
  - NPDU "Sterkh" (NPDU stands for nazemnyj punkt distantsionnogo upravleniya) – A BTR-D converted into an airborne unmanned aerial vehicle carrier and launch vehicle of the "Stroy-P" set. It is used to launch Yakovlev Pchela-1T UAVs for reconnaissance or jamming at ranges up to 60 km. The single-rail launcher is mounted on left hand side of the roof of the hull. It has a large three-piece tube on the forward right hand side of the roof of the hull. It entered service in 1990.
    - Malakite – An improved NPDU Sterkh.
  - BMD-1KSh "Soroka" (Ob'yekt 926) (KSh stands for komandno-shtabnaya – command and staff) – an airborne command post equipped with the R-123M, R-111 and R-130M or R-134 radio sets, as well as an AB1 portable 1 kW generator, the TNA-3 navigation system, folding CLOTHES HORSE type antennae around the superstructure and two slim antenna masts. Bow mounted machine guns and firing ports were removed. The commander's hatch is offset to the left and does not project forward. It's sometimes called BMD-KSh or KShM-D.
  - BMD-1R "Sinitsa" (R stands for radiostantsiya – signals vehicle) – A division-level command and signals vehicle equipped with a R-161A2M radio set, one heavy telescopic antenna mast stowed along the left hand side of the roof of the hull and one slim elevatable antenna mast on the rear right hand side of the roof of the personnel compartment. Only a small number were delivered.
  - R-440-ODB "Kristall-BDS" – A BTR-D converted into an airborne satellite communications vehicle with a R-440 system with a range of 15,000 km. The vehicle has a roof-mounted satellite dish AK-12 that is covered with a cage-like structure during transport.
  - 1V119 "Reostat" – A BTR-D converted into an airborne artillery battalion fire direction vehicle. The vehicle is fitted with a turret equipped with NNP-21 and V-7 observation devices, three R-173 and R-159 radio sets, a PAB-2AM aiming circle, three antennae mounts, DSP-30 and DAK-2 rangefinders. The turret was equipped with PSNR-5K (1RL-133-1) "Tall Mike" ground surveillance radar mounted on the roof of the turret. Located over the turret front sights were visors hinged in the centre.
  - 2S9 Nona-S (Ob'yekt 925S) – An airborne self-propelled mortar, armed with a 120 mm 2A60 mortar. Entered service in 1981.

== Operators ==
A map of BTR-D operators in blue, with former operators in red

=== Current operators ===
- Moldova – 9 BTR-D as of 2024.
- Russia – 550 BTR-D in active service as of 2024. At least 106 BTR-D have been visually confirmed lost (by Russian side) so far in the 2022 Russian invasion of Ukraine.
- Ukraine – 30 in the Ukrainian Airborne Forces as of 2024, with 40 in service in 1995, 42 in 2000 and 44 in 2005. At least 3 BTR-D have been visually confirmed lost (by Ukrainian side) so far in the 2022 Russian invasion of Ukraine.
- Uzbekistan – 50 in 2024. 70 were in service in 1995, 50 in 2000 and 2005.

=== Former operators ===
- Soviet Union – Passed on to successor states.
- Belarus – 117 in 1995, 22 in 2000, 2003 and 2005. None recorded in service as of 2024.
