= Minigali Shaymuratov =

Bashkir cavalry general of the Red Army during World War II

General Minigali Mingazovich Shajmuratov
- Минигали́ Минга́зович Шаймура́тов
- Born: 15 August 1899; Bishtyaki, Ufa District, Ufa Province, Russian Empire
- Died: 23 February 1943 (aged 43); Voroshilovgrad Oblast, Ukrainian SSR, USSR
- Military career
- Allegiance: Soviet Union
- Branch: Red Army (cavalry)
- Service years: 1919–1943
- Rank: Major-general
- Conflicts: Russian Civil War; World War II
- Awards: Hero of the Russian Federation

Minigali Mingazovich Shajmuratov (Russian: Минигали́ Минга́зович Шаймура́тов, Tatar: Миңлегали Минһаҗетдин улы Шайморатов; 15 August 1899 – 23 February 1943) was a Tatar cavalry general of the Red Army during Second World War who was posthumously awarded the title of Hero of the Russian Federation on 23 March 2020.

== Biography ==
Shaymuratov was born in the village of Bishtyaki, (now Shaimuratovo) on 15 August 1899. After the death of his mother at age 14, he went to Ufa to work as a sailor on the steamboat Ural for Ufa Shipping Company.

He joined the Red Army in June 1919 to fight in the ongoing Civil War. He served in the 270th Beloretsk Rifle Regiment of the 30th Rifle Division of the 5th Army of the Eastern front, in which he fought off soldiers of Admiral Alexander Kolchak. He participated in the offensives of Perm, Peter and Paul, and Omsk. He was sent off from the military in April 1920 to study.

In January 1921, he graduated from the 9th Kazan Cavalry Courses. After so, he became a platoon commander of the 2nd Cavalry Regiment of the Separate Volga Cavalry Brigade, where he helped suppress the Tambov Rebellion. From October 1921 he was a platoon and eventually a squadron leader in the 6th Kirsanov cavalry courses, and again a squadron leader in the 7th Starozhilovsky cavalry courses.

From November 1922 he served in the 79th Cavalry Regiment of the 14th Cavalry Division of the First Cavalry Army of S. M. Budyonny in the North Caucasus Military District. In 1924 he graduated from the repeated district courses of the middle staff of this district. From March 1925 he served as a platoon commander and course commander at the United Military School named after the All-Russian Central Executive Committee in Moscow.

Since August 1930 he was a student of the Military Academy of the Red Army named after M. V. Frunze:he graduated from the 1st year of the main faculty (1931-1932) and the oriental faculty (1932-1934). Since 1934, he served in the 4th (since 1934 - Intelligence) Directorate of the General Staff of the Red Army:assistant to the head of the department, in 1934-1935 - military attaché in Turkey, in 1936-1937 - adviser to the military committee under the Kuomintang government in China, from 1938 to December 1940 - military attaché in China.

According to Konstantin Simonov, Shaimuratov was well versed in English, Chinese, Tatar, Uyghur and Kazakh languages, and probably therefore "travelled half the world on special assignments of the government."

After the outbreak of the Great Patriotic War in 1941, Colonel M. M. Shaimuratov was transferred to the Inspectorate of Cavalry of the Red Army and appointed commander of the Kremlin protection unit - the 1st Special Cavalry Regiment, which was soon sent to the front as part of the corps of General L. M. Dovator. For the battles near Volokolamsk, on the outskirts of Moscow, M. M. Shaimoratov was awarded the second Order of the Red Banner.

On December 25, 1941, he arrived in Ufa and took up the post of commander of the 112th Bashkir Cavalry Division. From July 2, 1942, the division as part of the 8th Cavalry Corps fought as part of the Bryansk Front, participating in the Voronezh-Voroshilovgrad defensive operation. In November, she was transferred to the 5th Panzer Army of the Southwestern Front. There she participated in the Battle of Stalingrad. During the Srednedon offensive in December 1942, the division distinguished itself during the liberation of Taltsinskaya and Morozovsk.

On November 10, 1942, Colonel M. M. Shaimuratov was awarded the military rank of Major General[2].

In the Voroshilovgrad offensive operation in February 1942, the division and corps as part of the 3rd Guards Army successfully operated in the depths of the German defences, making a long-range raid to Millerovo and Makeyevka.

For courage and heroism in battles, for the successful fulfilment of important operational tasks, the 112th Bashkir Cavalry Division was awarded the Order of the People's Commissar of Defence of the USSR of February 14, 1943 with the Guards rank and renamed the 16th Guards.

During the Kharkov defensive operation at the beginning of the German counteroffensive, the division was far in the German rear and was forced with heavy losses to break through from there to their own. On February 23, 1943, he died heroically between the villages of the Shterovsky Dynamite Plant named after G. I. Petrovsky (Petrovskoye) and Yulino (Shterovka) of the Voroshilovograd region when the regiment left the raid because of the enemy. During the war, he was considered missing, only in 1946 the fact of the death of General Shaimuratov was established.

According to the historian A. A. Maslov, based on the materials of the archive of the Ministry of Defense of Russia, General Shaimurgatov during hand-to-hand combat was seriously wounded and captured by the Nazis and immediately during the battle was barbarously tortured to death by the Don Cossacks who were in the service of the Nazis.

And his division continued to fight. Shaimurovskaya division during the Great Patriotic War passed from the Don to the Elbe more than 4000 km. 15 times marked in the orders of the Supreme Commander-in-Chief, as distinguished in battles. 3860 soldiers of the division were awarded orders and medals, 78 of them became Heroes of the Soviet Union and five full knights of the Order of Glory. Such a number of heroes is not in any compound of the Red Army.

== See also ==
- List of Heroes of the Russian Federation
