= Fyodor Shikunov =

Soviet fighter pilot (1921–1945)

Fyodor Ivanovich Shikunov
- Фёдор Иванович Шикунов
- Born: 30 April 1921; Maykop, Kuban-Black Sea Oblast, Russian SFSR
- Died: 15 March 1945 (aged 23); Friedewald, Hesse, Nazi Germany
- Military career
- Allegiance: Soviet Union
- Branch: Soviet Air Force
- Service years: 1939—1945
- Rank: Captain
- Unit: 69th Guards Fighter Aviation Regiment
- Commands: 69th Guards Fighter Aviation Regiment
- Conflicts: World War II †
- Awards: Hero of the Russian Federation (posthumous)

Fyodor Ivanovich Shikunov (Russian: Фёдор Иванович Шикунов; 30 April 1921 – 15 March 1945) was a Soviet fighter pilot and squadron commander of the 69th Guards Fighter Aviation Regiment during World War II who was credited with 21 solo and one shared aerial victories.

== Early life ==
Shikunov was born on 30 April 1921 in Maykop, to a peasant family. When he was 11 years old, his father died and he was forced to interrupt his studies at school. Shikunov worked at the timber plant in Maykop. Then he continued his studies and in 1939 he graduated from 8th grade at a school in Maykop, with honors. Then he worked as a salesman at a wood furniture factory, and later graduated from the Maykop aeroclub named after M.M. Gromov in June 1939.

== Military career ==
He joined the Red Army on 1 August 1939. In 1940, he graduated first class from the Taganrog Military Aviation School of Pilots named after V.P. Chkalov. He continued to serve in this aviation school as an instructor pilot. Following the outbreak of Operation Barbarossa, together with the school, he was evacuated to Omsk. In June 1942, he was transferred to the 22nd Reserve Fighter Aviation Regiment of the 6th Reserve Aviation Brigade of the Air Force of the Moscow Military District. The regiment was based at an airfield in Kineshma, Ivanovo Oblast. After working for three years as an instructor pilot, Shikunov became a first-class pilot.

In June 1943, after numerous requests, he was enlisted as a flight commander in the 69th Guards Fighter Aviation Regiment, which was then undergoing retraining in Ivanovo, and mastering the Bell P-39 Airacobra fighter. His unit saw combat on 5 October 1943, when the regiment fought as part of the 304th Fighter Aviation Division of the 7th Fighter Aviation Corps in the 5th Air Army with the 2nd Ukrainian Front. Later, in July 1944, the regiment, division and corps were transferred to the 2nd Air Army with the 1st Ukrainian Front. The division and corps in October 1944 were transferred into the 23rd Guards Fighter Aviation Division and the 6th Guards Fighter Aviation Corps, respectively.

Lieutenant Shikunov immediately after arriving at the front, proved himself to be an excellent fighter pilot, while flying the P-39. A few days after arriving at the front, during an air battle on 9 October 1943, he scored his first aerial victory by shooting down a Focke-Wulf Fw 189 reconnaissance aircraft. A month later, on 11 December 1943, he became a flying ace, after scoring his fifth aerial victory. In November 1943, he became deputy squadron commander and in April 1944 he was appointed squadron commander. In the same year, he became a member of the Communist Party of Soviet Union.

Alongside his regiment, he participated in numerous air battles and sorties during the Nizhnedneprovsk Strategic Operation, Kirovograd Offensive, Battle of the Korsun–Cherkassy Pocket, Uman–Botoșani Offensive, Lvov–Sandomierz Offensive, Battle of the Dukla Pass, Vistula–Oder Offensive, Lower Silesian Offensive and Upper Silesian Offensive. He also took part in air offensives over Romania. By July 1944, in 128 combat missions, he shot down 18 aircraft personally and 1 in group. For these feats, he was nominated for the title of Hero of Soviet Union, but did not receive it.

== Last mission ==
On 15 March 1945, Shikunov was killed after being shot down by anti-aircraft fire while attacking a German airfield near the village of Friedewald. He is buried at a cemetery in Brzeg, Poland.

His final tally accumulated through the course of approximately 212 sorties and 52 dogfights officially stands at 21 solo and one shared shootdowns. According to publications in the press, it is claimed that he shot down 25 or even 27 enemy aircraft.

On 2 May 1996, Russian president Boris Yeltsin posthumously awarded the title of Hero of the Russian Federation to Shikunov, for his heroism in aerial combat during World War II.

== Awards and honors ==
- Hero of the Russian Federation (2 May 1996, posthumous)
- Order of the Red Banner, twice (21 June 1944, 22 October 1944)
- Order of Alexander Nevsky (29 April 1944)
- Order of the Patriotic War, 1st class (13 May 1945, posthumous)
- Order of the Red Star (4 November 1943)

His name is engraved in gold letters at the Hall of Fame in Museum of the Great Patriotic War, Moscow.

== See also ==
- List of Heroes of the Russian Federation
