= Leonid Ivanovich Shcherbakov =

Soviet and Russian military officer (1936–2021)

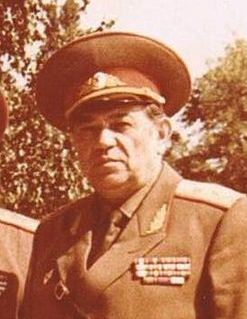
- Shcherbakov in 1989
- Native name: Леонид Иванович Щербаков
- Born: 12 October 1936; Bannovskoye, Stalino Oblast, Ukrainian SSR, Soviet Union
- Died: 29 May 2021 (aged 84) Moscow, Russia
- Buried: Troyekurovskoye Cemetery
- Allegiance: Soviet Union; Russia
- Branch: Soviet Tank Forces; Soviet Airborne Forces
- Service years: 1954–1992
- Rank: Lieutenant General
- Awards: Hero of the Russian Federation; Order of the Red Banner; Order of the Red Star; Medal "For Impeccable Service" - 1st, 2nd and 3rd classes

Leonid Ivanovich Shcherbakov (Russian: Леонид Иванович Щербаков; 12 October 1936 – 29 May 2021) was a Soviet and later Russian military officer who held a number of posts in the Soviet Army, reaching the rank of lieutenant general, and being awarded the title of Hero of the Russian Federation.

Orphaned by the Second World War, Shcherbakov entered the Soviet Armed Forces in the early 1950s, and trained at the Kiev Tank Technical School. This began a long association with the technical side of armoured warfare. Initially serving with the Soviet Tank Forces as part of the North Caucasus Military District, and rising through the ranks to greater responsibilities, he deepened his knowledge with studies at the Military Academy of the Armoured Forces, which included practical experiences of tank factories in Kharkov and Nizhny Tagil. He was then assigned to the 38th Research Institute of Armoured Vehicles in Kubinka as a test engineer, and carried out trials on fifteen different Soviet and foreign vehicles.

Shcherbakov became particularly involved in trials of the BMD-1, an armoured vehicle intended to be able to be dropped by aircraft. It was during these tests that he made his first parachute jump, triggering an interest and subsequent move to the Soviet Airborne Forces, where he worked in its scientific and technical committee. Initially the BMD-1 was to be dropped separately from its crew, who would locate it after landing. This proved unsatisfactory, and Shcherbakov became involved in trials of parachute and rocket-braking systems to allow members of the crew to be aboard the vehicle during its descent. In January 1976 he and Major Aleksandr Margelov became the first in the world to make an experimental landing inside the BMD-1. Both were nominated for the award of Hero of the Soviet Union, but this was not acted upon and Shcherbakov only received the lesser Order of the Red Banner. His later career included important positions as deputy commander of the North Caucasus Military District and deputy commander in chief of the Group of Soviet Forces in Germany. He continued to evaluate and test military equipment during the Soviet–Afghan War, and ended his career as Inspector-General of Equipment and Armaments in the Main Inspectorate of the Ministry of Defence. Only in retirement was his work fully rewarded, with the award of the title of Hero of the Russian Federation in 1996. He died in 2021 at the age of 84.

== Early life and career ==
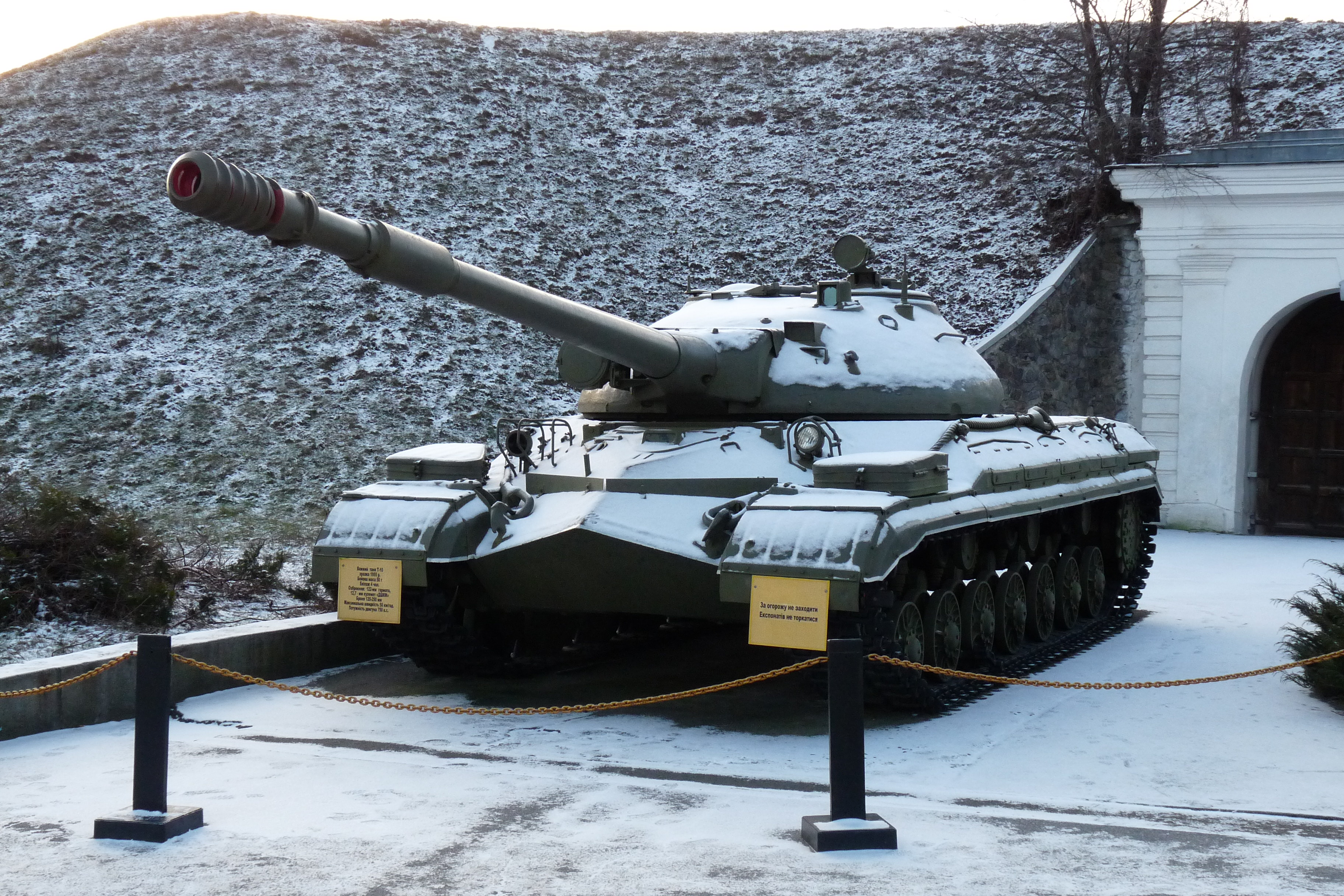
A T-10 heavy tank, which began entering service at the same time Shcherbakov was beginning his military career

Shcherbakov was born on 12 October 1936 in Bannovskoye, Stalino Oblast, which was then part of the Ukrainian SSR, in the Soviet Union. His father died while fighting at the front following the Axis invasion of the Soviet Union in 1941, and that year Shcherbakov was evacuated to the Urals. He was placed in an orphanage there in 1943 and subsequently grew up in the region, graduating from high school there.

Shcherbakov joined the Soviet Armed Forces in the early 1950s, and in 1957 graduated from the Kiev Tank Technical School. After graduating, Shcherbakov was assigned to the Soviet Tank Forces with the rank of lieutenant, serving with the 14th Tank Division as part of the North Caucasus Military District. With his specialisation in engineer, he was initially deputy commander of a tank company, and later deputy commander of a reconnaissance battalion. In 1963 he enrolled in the Military Academy of the Armoured Forces, graduating in 1968 from the faculty of engineering. During his studies he gained practical experience at the tank factories in Kharkov and Nizhny Tagil. Having graduated, Shcherbakov was assigned to the 38th Research Institute of Armoured Vehicles in Kubinka as a test engineer. Over the next few years Shcherbakov was involved in the testing and trials of fifteen types of armoured vehicles, some Soviet, and some captured foreign examples. Shcherbakov carried out tests in the Karakum Desert, on the Black Sea and in Belarus, Ukraine and Transbaikal.

== Developing the BMD-1 ==
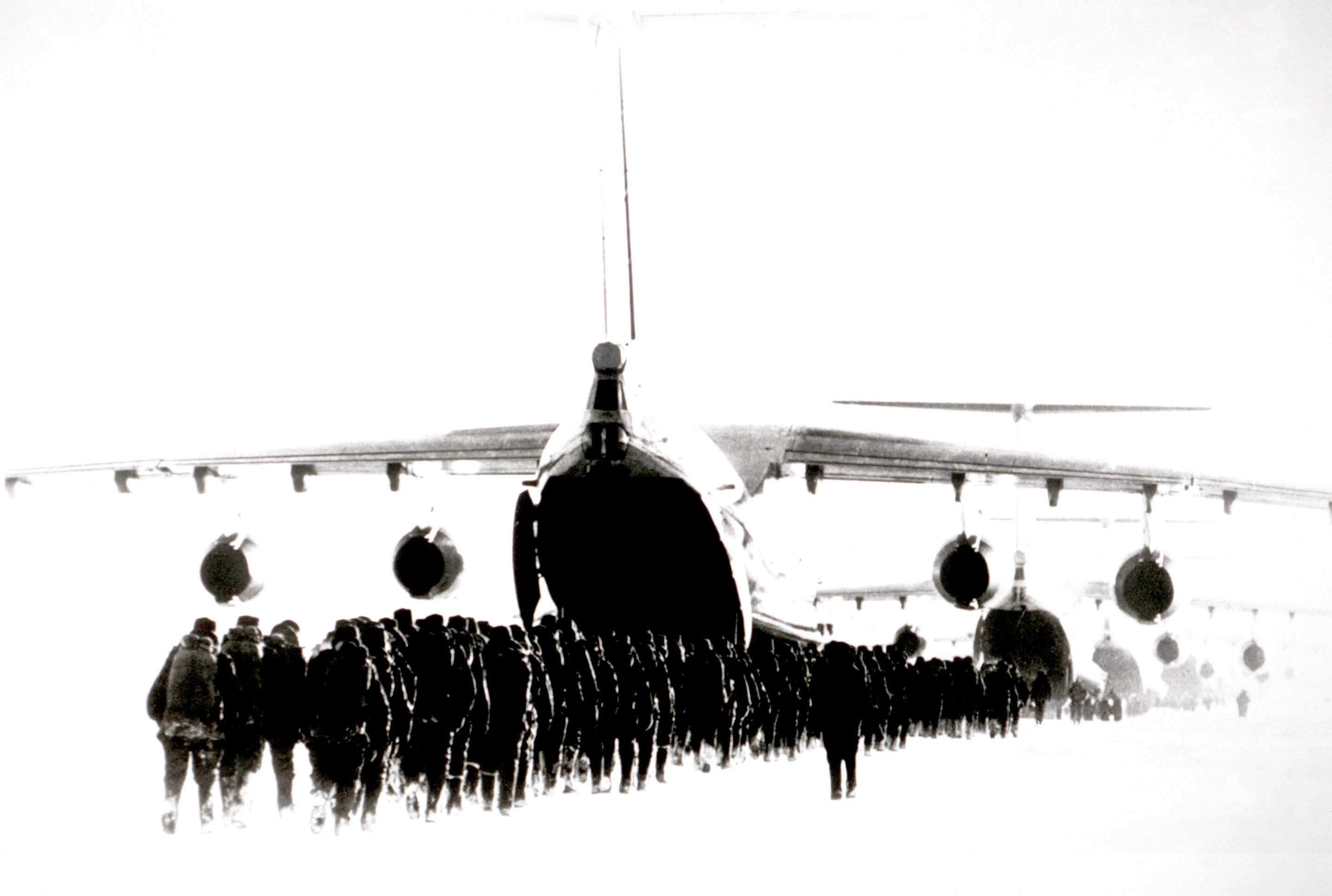
Troops of the Soviet Airborne Forces boarding an aircraft. Despite fracturing his leg on his first jump, Shcherbakov went on to work with the Airborne Forces.

During this period he was part of a team handpicked by Colonel-General Yuri Potopov, which joined in the evaluation of the BMD-1, a vehicle intended to be dropped by aeroplane in support of ground forces. While evaluating the craft, Shcherbakov made his first parachute jump. He later recalled how having completed all the necessary tests, he was disappointed that he was not able to fully appreciate the experience involved in deploying with the vehicle. The division commander promptly arranged for Shcherbakov to make a jump, after two days of training. Despite fracturing his leg on landing, Shcherbakov recalled that he was "euphoric", and was greeted by his comrades with the traditional award of a certificate, 3 rubles and 50 kopecks, a paratrooper badge, and copious amounts of vodka. They also signed his cast. On reporting the results of the test, and the fact he had carried out a successful jump to the commander of the experiments, the commander announced "That's it, I'm taking you, I need you in the Airborne Forces!"

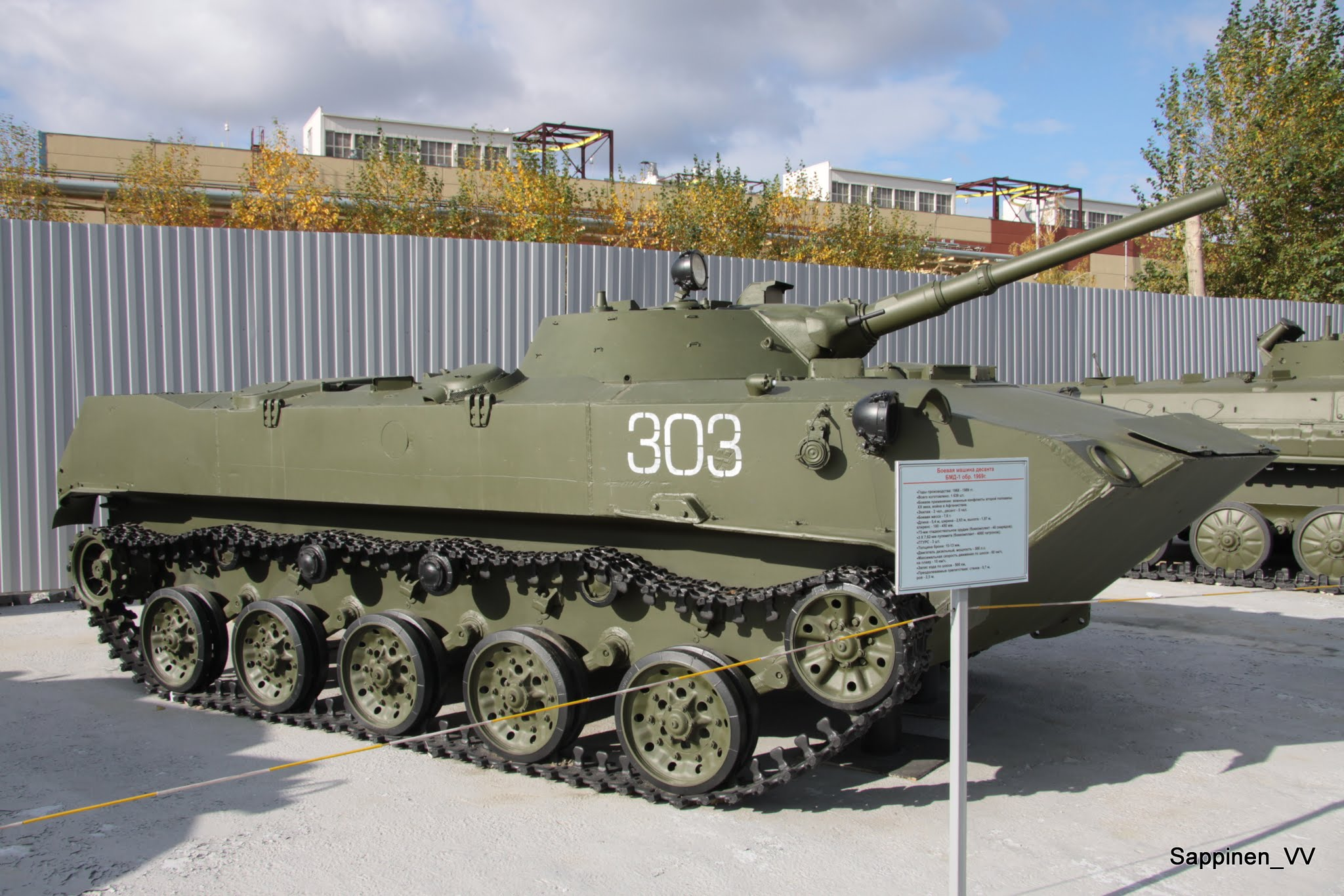
The BMD-1, an infantry fighting vehicle developed for the Airborne Forces. Shcherbakov carried out the first descent inside one of these vehicles, without a personal parachute.

Shcherbakov now became increasingly involved with the Soviet Airborne Forces, and in 1972 he was transferred to the Scientific and Technical Committee of the Airborne Fores. In 1976 he became head of the Airborne Forces' Armoured Service. Initial experiments with deploying the BMD-1 by air had proved problematic. The crew were dropped separately by parachute, often ending up some distance from the landing site of the BMD-1, and took time to locate it. Attempts were made to produce a system whereby the BMD-1 could be jettisoned from the aircraft with at least some of the crew inside, relying on the BMD-1's parachute system to allow the crew, who did not have personal parachutes, to land safely. On 23 January 1976 Lieutenant-Colonel Shcherbakov and Major Aleksandr Margelov became the first in the world to make an experimental landing inside the BMD-1 using a parachute-jet system. Given the extreme risk involved in the test, both Shcherbakov and Margelov were nominated for the award of Hero of the Soviet Union in 1976. The nomination was not acted upon, and in 1977 Shcherbakov instead received the Order of the Red Banner for "achievements in increasing the combat readiness of the Airborne Forces".

== Later career ==
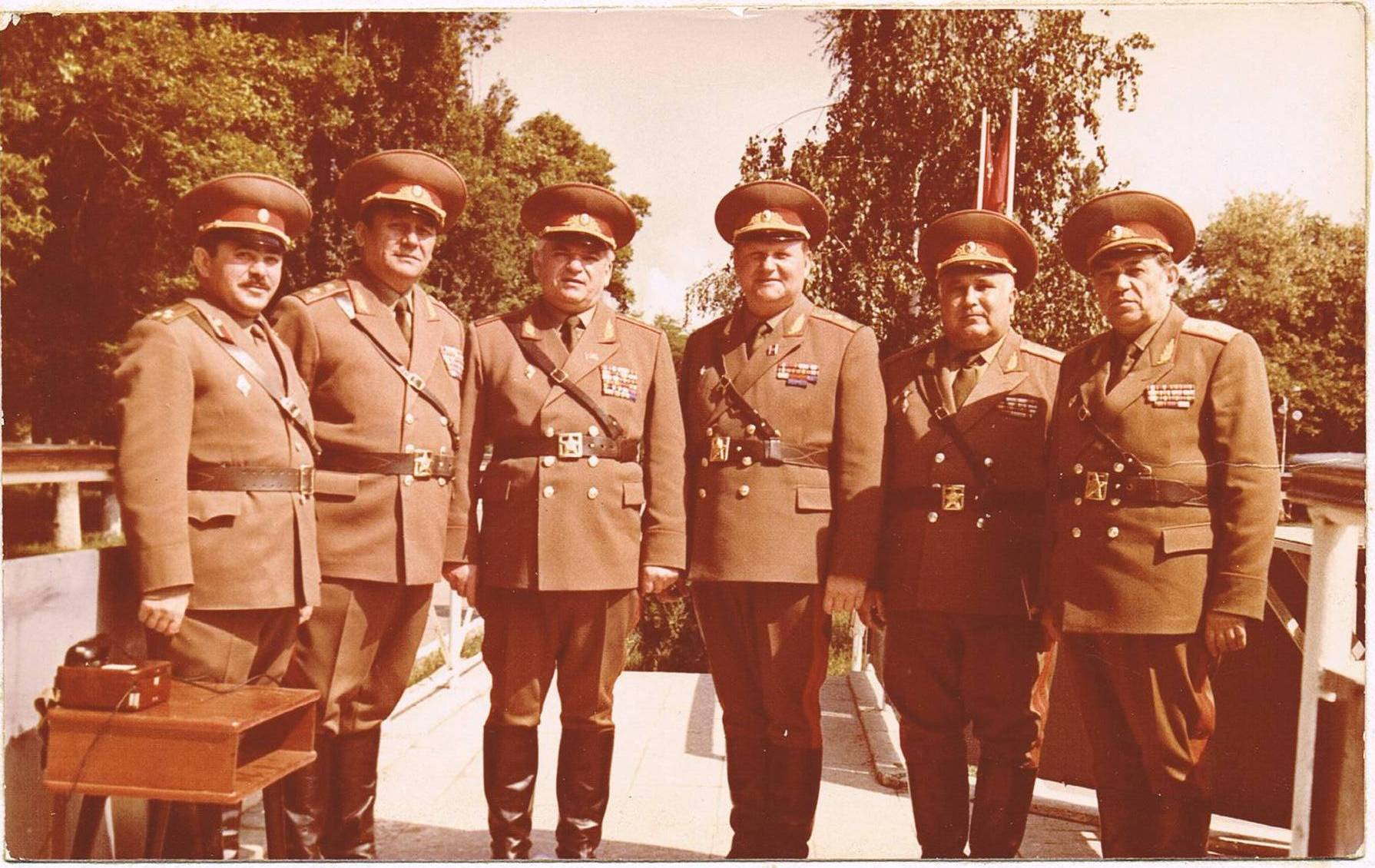
Shcherbakov (far right) in Maykop in 1989.

Shcherbakov went on to attend the Military Academy of the General Staff, graduating in 1981 and being appointed deputy commander of the North Caucasus Military District. In 1983 he became deputy commander in chief of the Group of Soviet Forces in Germany, with responsibility for armaments. He returned to the North Caucasus Military District as deputy commander for armaments in 1988, and was involved in testing and evaluating equipment and vehicles in combat conditions during the Soviet–Afghan War. In 1990 he became Inspector-General of Equipment and Armaments in the Main Inspectorate of the Ministry of Defence.

== Retirement ==
Retiring from active service in May 1992 with the rank of lieutenant-general, shortly after the dissolution of the Soviet Union the preceding year, Shcherbakov settled in Moscow and worked for the Russian Development Fund. On 22 August 1996 Shcherbakov was belatedly recognised for his "courage and heroism shown during testing, fine-tuning and mastering special equipment" with the award of the title of Hero of the Russian Federation. In 1997 he joined the Steel Scientific Research Institute as deputy commercial director, and in 2009 became advisor to the general director. He was also a board member of the Russian Association of Heroes.

Shcherbakov died on 29 May 2021 at the age of 84 after a "serious and prolonged illness". He was buried in the Troyekurovskoye Cemetery on 1 June 2021. Over his career Shcherbakov was awarded the title of Hero of the Russian Federation, the Orders of the Red Banner and the Red Star, and twenty Soviet, Russian, and foreign medals.

== See also ==
- List of Heroes of the Russian Federation
