= Evgeny Sheyko =

Russian conductor (1962–2020)

- Born: 10 March 1962; Nizhny Novgorod, Russia
- Occupation: Conductor of classical music

Evgeny Borisovich Sheyko (Russian: Евгений Борисович Шейко; 10 March 1962 – 19 November 2020) was a Russian conductor. A graduate of the Moscow Conservatory, where he studied with Gennady Rozhdestvensky, he served as chief conductor of the Nizhny Novgorod State Academic Opera and Ballet Theatre and led the student symphony orchestra of the Nizhny Novgorod State Conservatory from 1995 until his death in 2020.

== Early life and education ==
Sheyko was born in 1962 in Gorky, now Nizhny Novgorod. In 1988, he graduated from the Moscow Conservatory, where he studied opera and symphonic conducting with Gennady Rozhdestvensky. The Moscow Conservatory also lists Sheyko among Rozhdestvensky's conducting students.

== Career ==
After graduating from the Moscow Conservatory in 1988, Sheyko joined the Gorky Opera and Ballet Theatre, now the Nizhny Novgorod State Academic Opera and Ballet Theatre. He became chief conductor in 1992 and remained in the post for about twenty years. During this period, he conducted more than twenty new opera and ballet productions, among them The Tsar's Bride, Mazeppa, La bohème, Carmen, The Queen of Spades and Otello.

Sheyko also taught at the Nizhny Novgorod State Conservatory from 1989 to 2013 and directed its student symphony orchestra from 1995 to 2013. His work outside Nizhny Novgorod included guest appearances with Russian orchestras and opera companies and foreign tours. In 2012, for example, he conducted the Nizhny Novgorod Opera orchestra and chorus at the Teatro Cervantes in Málaga in a programme including Mozart's Requiem.

After leaving Nizhny Novgorod, Sheyko was chief conductor of the Buryat State Academic Opera and Ballet Theatre in 2013–2014 and of the Ryazan Musical Theatre in 2015–2016. He later worked at the State Opera and Ballet Theatre of the Sakha Republic, first as a guest conductor and, from 2019, as chief conductor.

== Conducting ==
- 1988–1992 — Conductor of Nizhny Novgorod State Academic Opera and Ballet Theatre
- 1993–1995 — General artistic director and conductor of Nizhny Novgorod Chamber Orchestra
- 1995–2020 — General artistic director and conductor of Students Symphonic Orchestra of Nizhny Novgorod State Conservatory
- 2001–2010 — Guest Conductor of opera and ballet festivals in Russian cities: Perm, Samara, Chelyabinsk, Krasnoyarsk, Cheboksary, Saratov
- 2004 — Guest Conductor of Ukraine State Symphonic Orchestra in Daegu (Republic of Korea)

== Concert tours ==
- With the opera and ballet troupe of Nizhny Novgorod State Academic Opera and Ballet Theatre:
  - 1989 — Smolensk, Petrozavodsk (Russia)
  - 1990 — Arkhangelsk, Murmansk (Russia)
  - 1991 — Kyiv (Ukraine)
- With the opera troupe of Nizhny Novgorod State Academic Opera and Ballet Theatre:
  - 1993 — Fort-de-France (France)
  - 2006 — Cheboksary (Russia)
  - 2008 — Kostroma (Russia)
- With the orchestra, chorus, and soloists of Nizhny Novgorod State Academic Opera and Ballet Theatre (symphonic programs):
  - 2008 — Sarov (Russia)
  - 2012 — Madrid, Barcelona, Málaga, Vigo (Spain), Lisbon, Porto (Portugal), Helsinki, Turku, Pori (Finland), Oslo, Stavanger (Norway), Stockholm (Sweden)

== Repertoire ==
Sheyko's repertoire includes more than 50 operas and ballets.

- Symphonies of Haydn, Mozart, Beethoven (all symphonies), Schubert, Brahms (all symphonies), Dvořák, Bruckner, Mahler, Sibelius, Honegger, Balakirev, Tchaikovsky (all symphonies), Rachmaninoff (all symphonies), Prokofiev, Shostakovich etc.
- Symphonic compositions of Liszt, Wagner, R. Strauss, Grieg, Debussy, Dukas, Ravel, Bartók, Glinka, Mussorgsky, Rimsky-Korsakov, Stravinsky, Scriabin etc.
- Instrumental concerts of Haydn, Mozart, Beethoven, Chopin, Liszt, Brahms, Dvořák, Grieg, Saint-Saëns, Sibelius, Tchaikovsky, Rachmaninoff, Scriabin, Prokofiev, Shostakovich etc.
- Compositions for soloists, chorus and orchestra: Requiem by Mozart, Requiem by Verdi, "The Damnation of Faust" by Berlioz, "The Bells" by Rachmaninoff, "Alexander Nevsky" by Prokofiev, "Carmina Burana" by Orff etc.

== Performances ==
Performances in Nizhny Novgorod State Academic Opera and Ballet Theatre:

- 1989 — “The Soldier's Tale” by Stravinsky
- 1990 — “The Tsar's Bride” by Rimsky-Korsakov
- 1991 — “Mazeppa” by Tchaikovsky
- 1994 — “The Gypsy Baron” by J. Strauss
- 1996 — “The Tales of Hoffmann” by Offenbach
- 1998 — “Aleko” by Rachmaninoff
- 2000 — “Ruslan and Ludmila” by Glinka
- 2001 — “La bohème” by Puccini
- 2002 — “The Bat“ by J. Strauss
- 2004 — “Carmen” by Bizet
- 2004 — “The Human Voice” by Poulenc
- 2004 — “Un ballo in maschera” by Verdi in Gwangju (Republic of Korea)
- 2004 — “Turandot” by Puccini in Incheon (Republic of Korea)
- 2006 — “Ivan Susanin” (“A Life for the Tsar”) by Glinka
- 2007 — “The Queen of Spades” by Tchaikovsky
- 2008 — “Cio-Cio San” by Puccini
- 2010 — “Otello“ by Verdi
- 2011 — “The Nutcracker” by Tchaikovsky
