= Sergey Sheyko =

Russian soldier

Sergey Sergeyevich Sheyko (Russian: Серге́й Серге́евич Шейко; born January 23, 1967, Oleksandriia in present-day Ukraine), Hero of the Russian Federation, is a colonel in Russian Naval Infantry.

Sergey Sheyko was commissioned into the Naval Infantry in 1989 after completing the Far Eastern Higher Combined Arms Command School. In January–May 1995 captain Sheyko, commander of marine company, participated in the First Chechen War, including storming of Presidential Palace in Grozny. He showed outstanding degree of personal courage and military mastership. In fierce battles his group performed important tasks, with virtually no losses of his subordinates. His first citation for the title of Hero of the Russian Federation was issued in February 1995 but did not materialize; he was awarded the title of Hero on August 28, 1995.

Sheyko completed postgraduate military education in the Combined Arms Academy of the Armed Forces of the Russian Federation (2000) and General Staff Academy (2005) and, at 2009, service with the Baltic Fleet naval infantry. Since 2017 retired colonel.

== See also ==
- List of Heroes of the Russian Federation
