= List of NATO reporting names for anti-tank missiles =

NATO reporting name for AT series anti-tank guided missiles, with Soviet designations:

- AT-1 Snapper (3M6 Shmel)
- AT-2 Swatter (3M11 Falanga)
- AT-3 Sagger (9M14 Malyutka)
- AT-4 Spigot (9M111 Fagot)
- AT-5 Spandrel (9M113 Konkurs)
- AT-6 Spiral (9M114 Shturm)
- AT-7 Saxhorn (9M115 Metis)
- AT-8 Songster (9M112 Kobra)
- AT-9 Spiral-2 (9M120 Ataka)
- AT-10 Stabber (9M117 Bastion)
- AT-11 Sniper (9M119 Svir" / "Refleks)
- AT-12 Swinger (9M118 Sheksna)
- AT-13 Saxhorn-2 (9M131 Metis-M)
- АТ-14 Spriggan (9M133 Kornet)
- АТ-15 Springer (9M123 Khrizantema)
- AT-16 Scallion (9A1472? Vikhr / Vikhr-M?)
- Hermes (missile) air-launched: anti-tank option.

== See also ==
- NATO reporting name
- List of anti-tank guided missiles
