= BMD-2 =

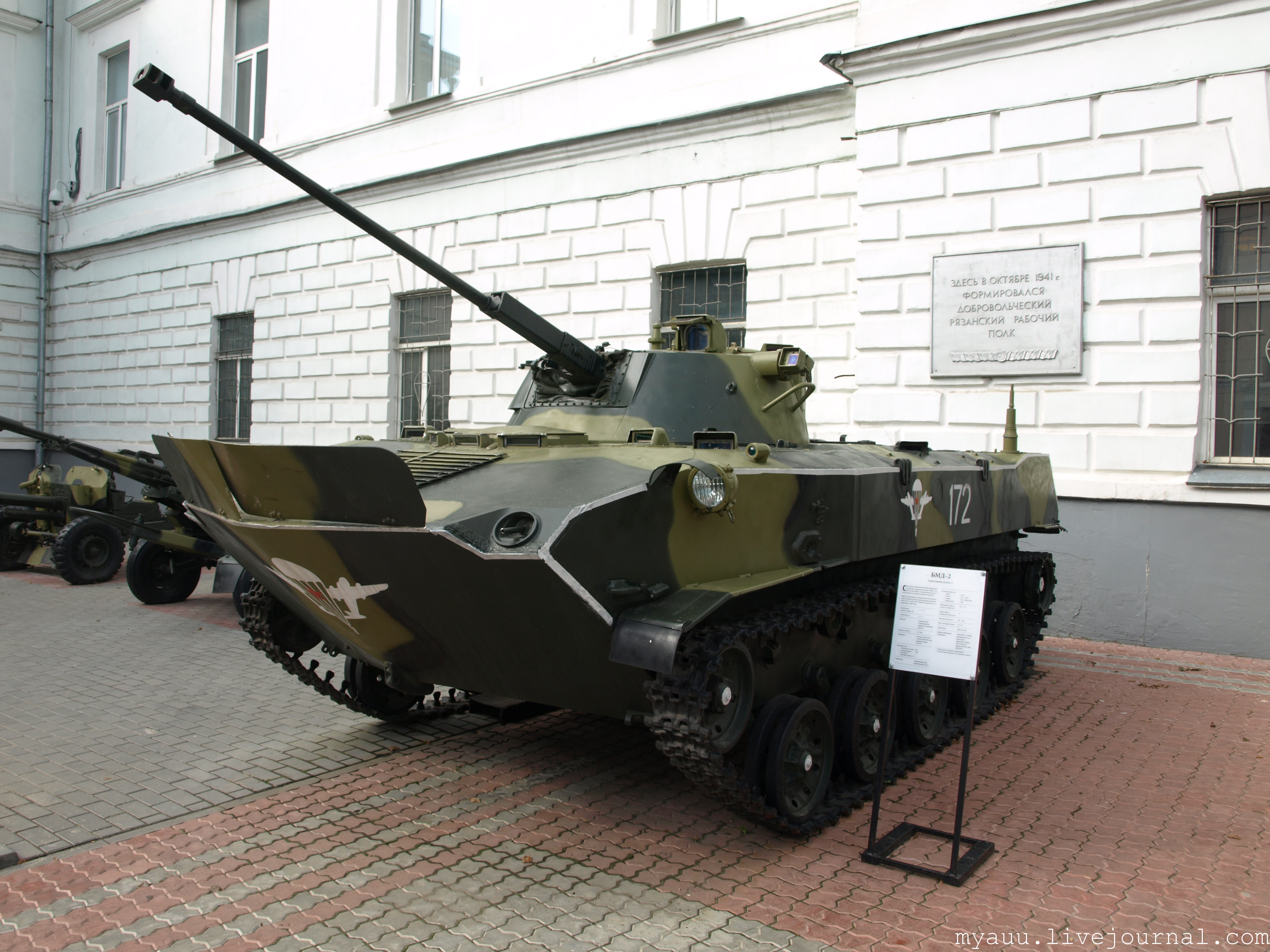
- BMD-2 airborne combat vehicle outside the 'Museum of the History of the Airborne Forces in the city of Ryazan
- Type: Airborne infantry fighting vehicle
- Place of origin: Soviet Union

Service history
- In service: 1985–present
- Used by: See Operators
- Wars: See Service history

Production history
- Designed: 1981–1985
- Manufacturer: Volgograd Tractor Plant
- Produced: 1985–1991? (out of production)
- Variants: See Variants

Specifications (BMD-2)
- Mass: 11.5 tonnes
- Length: 5.91 m (Gun forward) 5.40 m (Hull)
- Width: 2.63 m
- Height: 1.97 m with suspension raised 1.62 m with suspension lowered
- Crew: 2 (driver + gunner) + 6 dismounts (1 commander + 1 machine gunner + 4 infantry)
- Armor: Welded aluminium alloy 7 mm turret 15 mm hull front 10 mm rest of the hull
- Main armament: 30 mm 2A42 autocannon (300 rounds (180 AP and 120 HE)); 9M111 / 9M113 ATGMs
- Secondary armament: 7.62 mm PKT coaxial tank machine gun 7.62 mm PKT hull tank machine gun 2,940 rounds
- Engine: 5D-20 6-cylinder 4-stroke V-shaped liquid cooled 15.9 liter diesel 241 hp (180 kW) at 2,600 rpm
- Power/weight: 21 hp/tonne (15.7 kW/tonne)
- Suspension: torsion-bar
- Ground clearance: Adjustable; 100 mm to 450 mm
- Fuel capacity: 300 l
- Operational range: 450 km (road)
- Maximum speed: 80 km/h (road); 40 km/h (cross country); 10 km/h (swimming)

The BMD-2 is a Soviet airborne infantry fighting vehicle, introduced in 1985. It is a variant of BMD-1 with a new turret and changes to the hull. BMD stands for Boyevaya Mashina Desanta (Боевая Машина Десанта, which literally translates to "Airborne Combat Vehicle").

It was developed as a replacement for the BMD-1 but did not supersede it entirely in Soviet service. Its NATO designation is BMD M1981/1.

== Development ==
When the Soviet–Afghan War broke out, the Soviet forces operated BMP-1 IFVs and BMD-1 airborne IFVs. They were both armed with a 73 mm 2A28 Grom low-pressure smoothbore short-recoil semi-automatic gun, a 9S428 ATGM launcher capable of firing the 9M14 Malyutka, the 9M14M Malyutka-M and the 9M14P Malyutka-P ATGMs and a coaxial 7.62 mm PKT machine gun. This armament was effective against soft targets such as unarmoured vehicles, infantry, and lightly fortified positions, but was not effective in the anti-tank role, and suffered in mountainous terrain due to the low elevation angle of the main gun.

In 1981 the units fighting in Afghanistan started receiving new BMP-2 IFVs. Its 30 mm 2A42 multi-purpose autocannon with two-belt loading system and high elevation angle addressed the drawbacks of the 73 mm 2A28 gun. The 9S428 ATGM launcher was replaced by a pintle-mounted 9P135M-1 ATGM launcher with semi-automatic control.

It was now capable of firing the SACLOS-guided 9M113 Konkurs, the 9M113M Konkurs-M, the 9M111 Fagot and the 9M111-2 Fagot ATGMs, which proved to be much more effective and reliable than the older missiles. The Soviet airborne forces command decided to arm their units with similar vehicles.

In the beginning it became obvious that the hull of BMD-1 was too small for the BMP-2 turret. Therefore, it was decided to design two vehicles. The first was supposed to satisfy the immediate need for a new airborne IFV by modifying the BMD-1/BMP-1 turret, arming it with the same armament as the one on the BMP-2 and then fitting it onto the BMD-1 hull. The second vehicle was intended to be much bigger to allow fitting of the BMP-2 turret and later became the BMD-3.

The modernised variant of the BMD-1 was developed in 1983 and incorporated the new B-30 turret armed with a 30 mm 2A42 multi-purpose autocannon, a 7.62 mm PKT coaxial machine gun and a pintle-mounted 9P135M ATGM launcher. It entered production in 1985.

== Description ==
=== Overview ===
The BMD-2 has a slightly modernized BMD-1 hull and a new turret.

=== Crew ===
The crew of the BMD-2 is the same as that in the BMD-1. The commander received the R-123M radio set for communication.

The new turret seats the gunner on the left hand side of the main gun. On top of the turret there is one single piece circular hatch opening to the front. Located in front of the hatch is the gunner's sight which is the same one as the one used in BMP-2. Another gunner's sight is located on the left hand side of the main gun and moves in vertical planes along with it. It is a high angle of fire sight used when the gunner is aiming at air targets. The vehicle has additional periscopes that provide it with vision on the sides. A white searchlight is mounted in front of the turret.

=== Turret ===
The B-30 turret is a modified version of the BMP-1/BMD-1 turret.

=== Armament ===
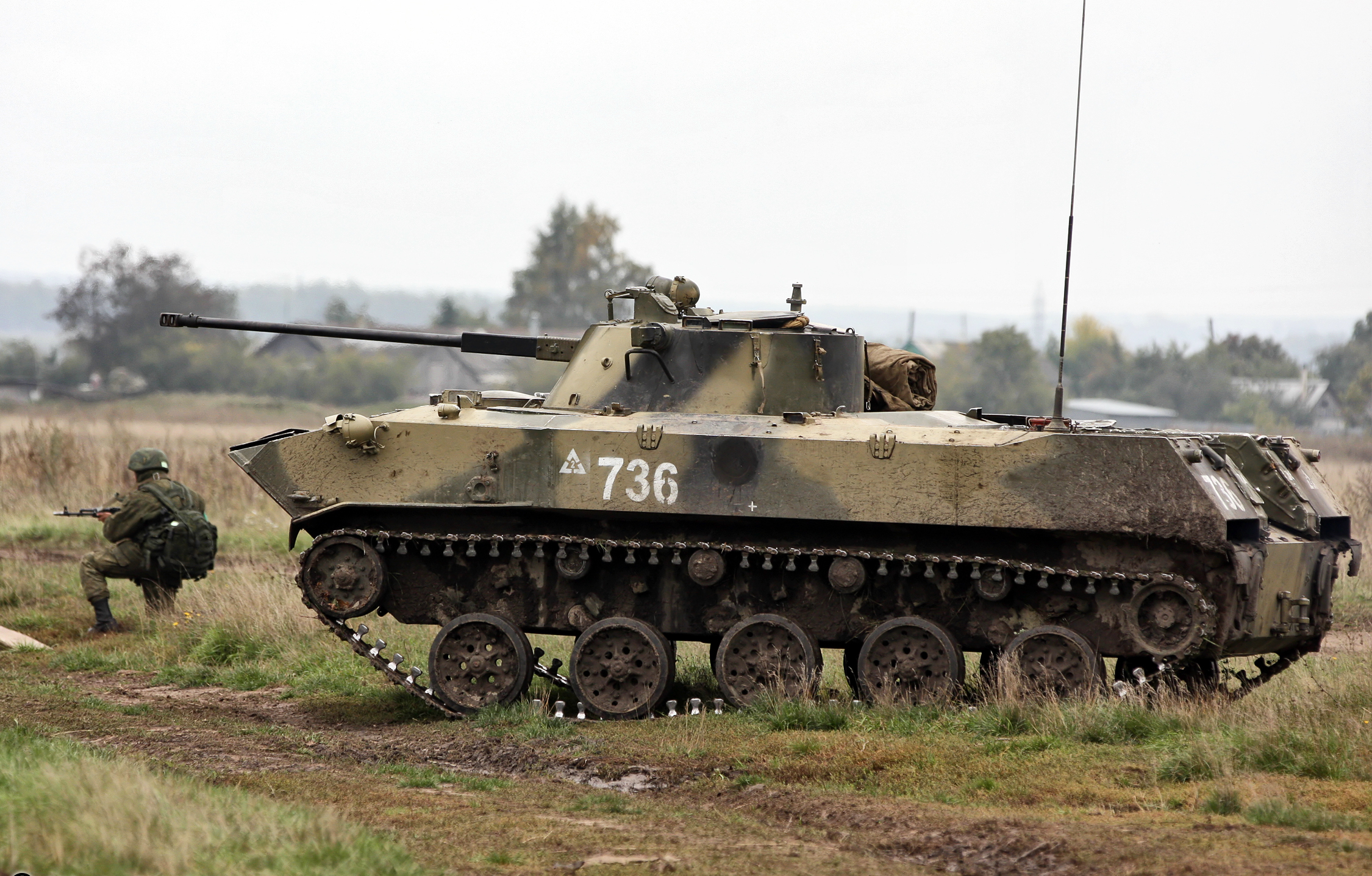
A BMD-2 of the 106th Guards Airborne Division

The vehicle is armed with a stabilized 30 mm 2A42 multi-purpose autocannon and a 7.62 mm PKT coaxial machine gun. The vehicle carries 300 rounds for the main gun (180 AP and 120 HE) and 2,940 rounds for the machine gun. The main gun can be elevated or depressed between 85° and −5° and can be used to fire at air targets.

The turret is armed with a pintle-mounted 9P135M ATGM launcher. It is capable of firing 9M113 Konkurs, 9M113M Konkurs-M, 9M111 Fagot and 9M111-M Faktoria ATGMs.

=== Maneuverability ===
The BMD-2 has the same engine and same suspension as the BMD-1, with a maximum road operational range of 450 km.

=== Air-drop techniques ===
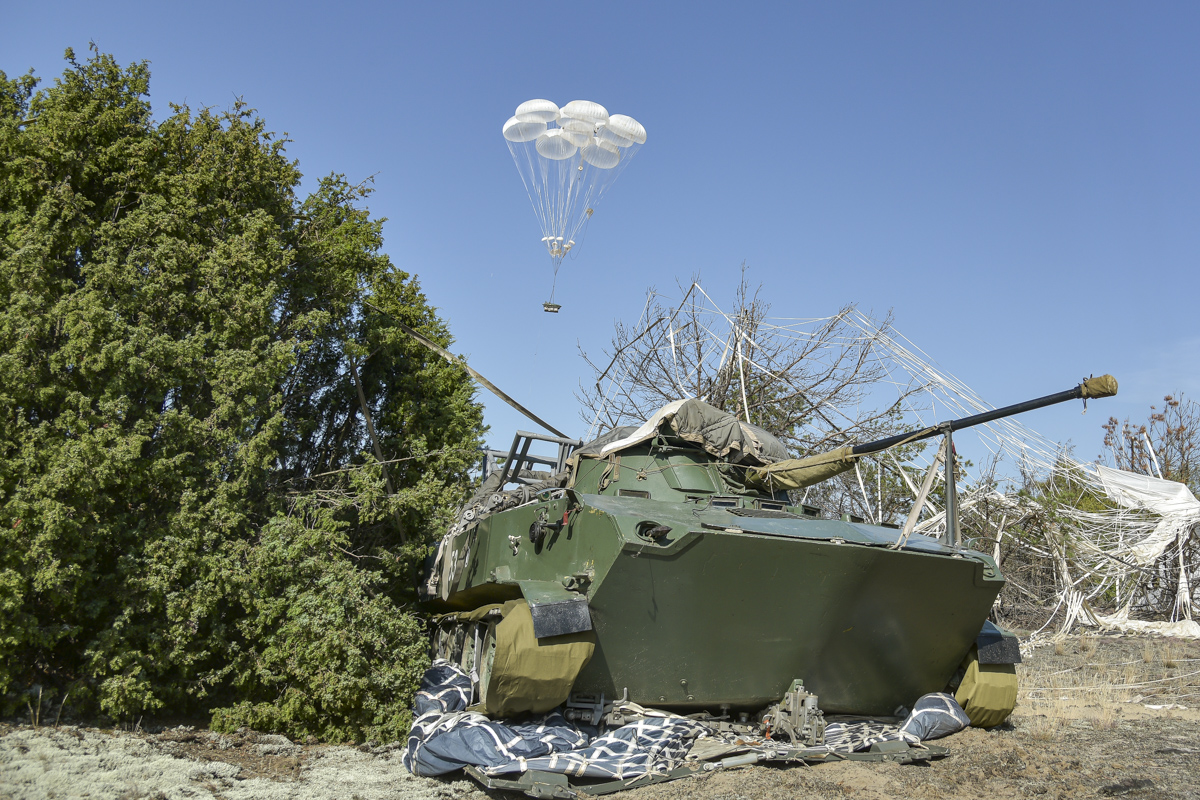
A BMD-2 immediately after airborne drop from an Il-76 heavy transport aircraft; another vehicle descends in the background. Photographed during the joint exercise "Slavic Brotherhood-2020" in Belarus.

The vehicle can be transported by An-12, An-22, Il-76, An-124 airplanes and Mi-6 and Mi-26 helicopters.

A rocket parachute, the PRSM-915, was developed to ensure the vehicle's safe landing. To use the parachute, the BMD is first packed onto a special pallet before takeoff. To drop the BMD, a drogue chute is released that initially drags the BMD out of the Il-76 transport plane. Once clear of the plane a single large main chute opens. The deployment of the main chute triggers the deployment of four long rods which hang beneath the pallet.

As soon as the rods touch the ground a retrorocket fires, slowing the BMD to a descending speed between 6 m/s and 7 m/s and giving it a relatively soft landing. It allowed a BMD to be relatively safely parachuted with both the driver and the gunner. This system entered service in 1975 for the BMD-1, and was always used for the BMD-2 afterwards.

=== Amphibious ability ===
The BMD-2 is fully amphibious. It can swim after switching on the two electric bilge pumps, erecting the two piece trim vane which improves vehicle's stability and displacement in water and prevents the water from flooding the bow of the tank. The driver switches the periscope to a swimming periscope that enables the driver to see over the trim vane.

=== Armour protection ===
The aluminium armour thickness is 7 mm on the turret, 15 mm on the front of the hull and 10 mm on the rest of the hull. The hull's front armour has two sections: upper and lower. The upper section is angled at 78° while the lower one is angled at 50°. It is resistant to small arms fire and shrapnel.

=== Troop compartment ===
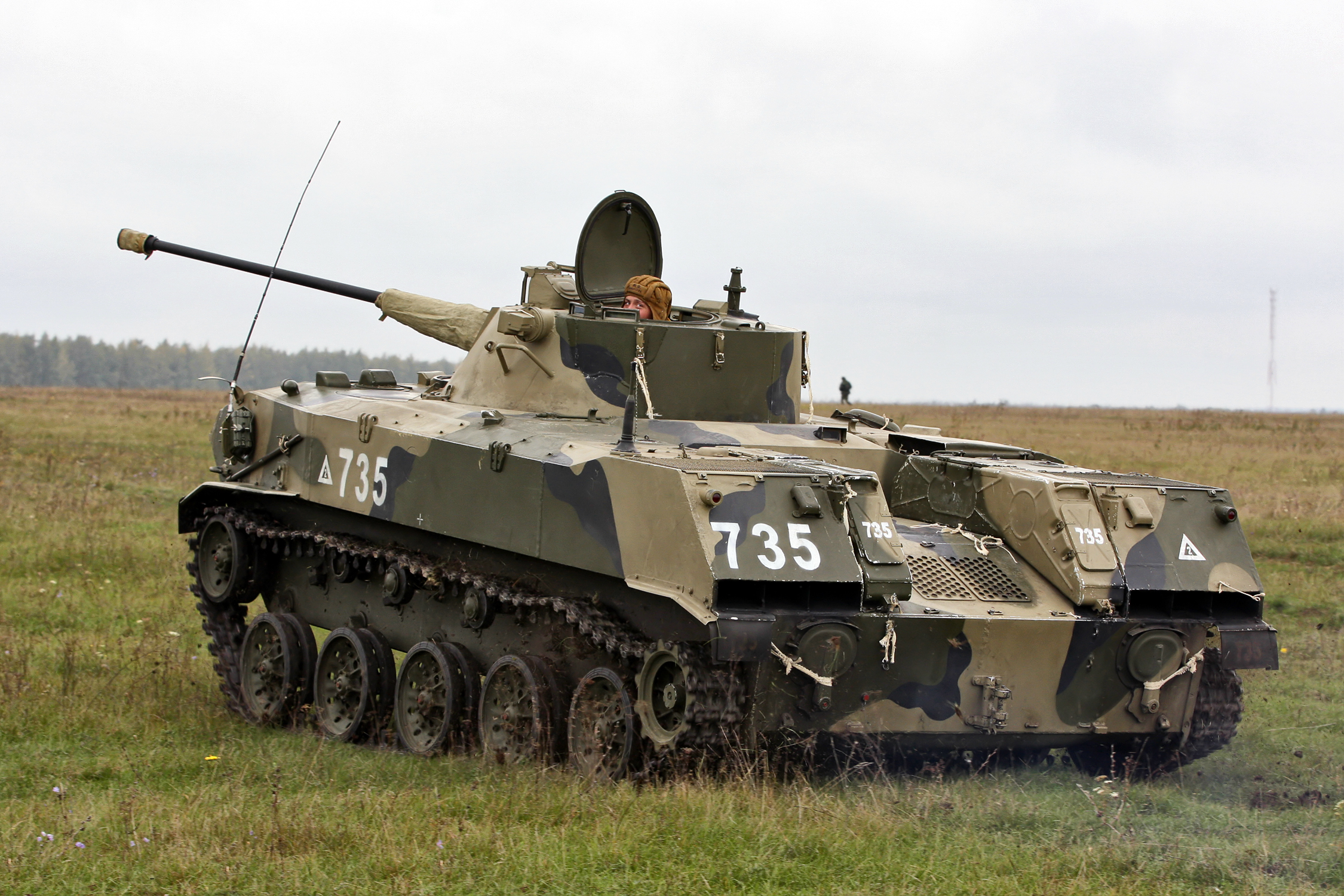
A rear view of BMD-2

The design was made in order to save necessary weight, and sacrifices crew comfort. Like the BMD-1, the BMD-2 has an extremely cramped interior space. It is much smaller than the BMP-1 and BMP-2 IFV's. It can carry five infantrymen, including the vehicle commander, bow machine gunner and three soldiers seated behind the turret.

It is equipped with periscope vision blocks on the sides and rear of the vehicle. There are three firing ports, two on each side of the hull and one in the rear.

=== Equipment ===
The BMD-2 has the same equipment as the BMD-1, except for the R-123 radio set which was replaced by the R-123M radio set.

== Service history ==
The BMD-2 entered service with Soviet airborne forces in 1985.

=== Soviet–Afghan War ===
The BMD-2 took part in the Soviet–Afghan War.

=== Stabilisation Force in Bosnia and Herzegovina ===
Later the BMD-2 was used by Russian airborne units of SFOR including the Russian airborne brigade stationed in Tojsici which supported Operation Joint Guard.

=== Russo-Georgian War ===
The BMD-2 is used by Russian airborne units stationed in Abkhazia. BMD-2’s were employed by the Russian 234th Airborne Assault Regiment in the Russo-Georgian War in 2008, with one being lost in action.

=== War in the Donbas ===
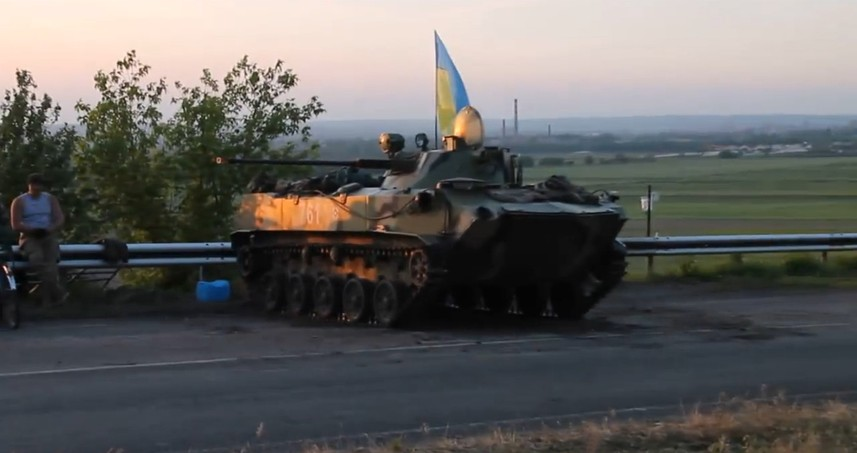
Ukrainian BMD-2 at a roadblock between Kramatorsk and Sloviansk on 11 May 2014

During the war in Donbas, BMD-2s were used by units of the Ukrainian Airmobile Forces, and by separatists of Novorossiya. Ukrainian Airborne BMD-2’s were some of the first armored vehicles destroyed in the conflict. At least one BMD-2 was reported to have been used by separatists while they were besieged in the city of Sloviansk, and others separatist BMD-2’s were recorded in action.

=== Russian invasion of Ukraine ===
The BMD-2 has been used by Russian airborne forces in the Russian invasion of Ukraine. After Russian forces failed to capture Kyiv, British journalist Mark Urban suggested the BMD-2 and other "armoured vehicles designed to be light enough to be carried on planes do not give much protection from enemy fire." As of 5 November 2025, the open-source intelligence site, Oryx has visually confirmed the loss of 410 Russian BMD-2s (319 destroyed, 7 damaged, 29 abandoned and 55 captured).

== Variants ==
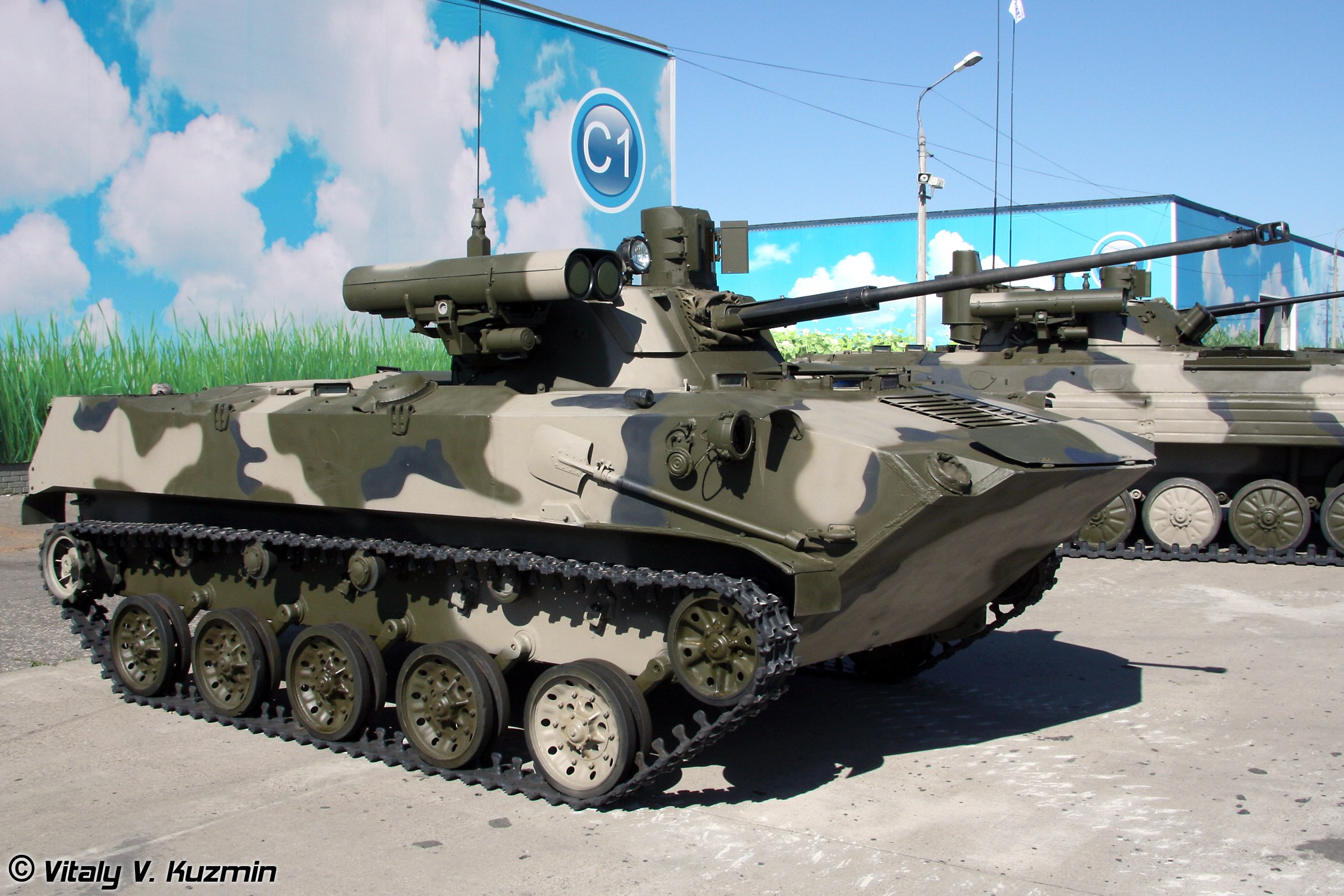
BMD-2M upgrade with improved fire control system and 9M133 Kornet guided missiles.

- BMD-2 (Ob'yekt 916) – Basic model.
  - BMD-2K (K stands for komandirskaya – command) – Command variant fitted with an additional antennae.
  - BMD-2K-AU – BMD-2K modernization, with new communication and command equipment.
  - BMD-2M – BMD-2 modernization, with the original turret replaced by the Bereg combat module. The main armament is similar to that of the non-upgraded BMD-2, with a 2A42 cannon with 300 rounds, and a PKTM machine gun. However, the original missile system is replaced by two launchers for 9M133 Kornet missiles. A new fire-control system is installed, with a new sight including a thermal channel, a laser rangefinder, a new ballistic computer coupled with a meteorological sensor and with automatic target tracking, and a new stabilizer. A new radio is installed, and three smoke grenade launchers are added. The first batch was delivered in May 2026.

== Operators ==
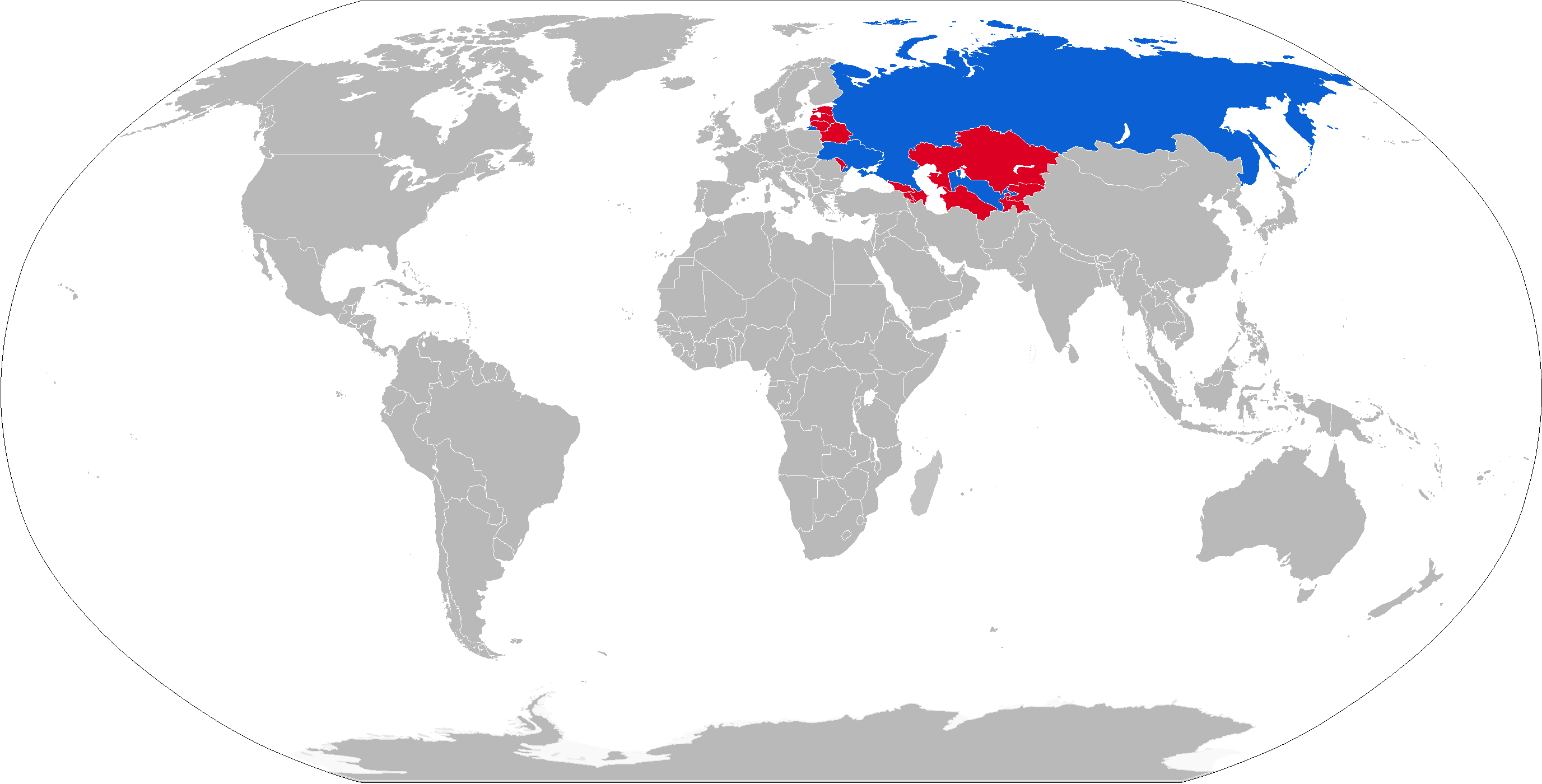
Operators Current Former

=== Current operators ===
- Russia – About 849 in active service and more than 1,500 in storage as of 2013. In service as of 2023.
- Ukraine – 63 in 1995 and 78 in 2000 and 2005.

=== Former operators ===
- Soviet Union – Passed on to successor states.

== See also ==
- BMD-1
- BMD-3
- BMP-1
- BMP-2
- BMP-3
- List of AFVs
- Soviet Airborne Forces
- Russian Airborne Troops
