= AT-7 =

AT-7 may refer to:

- AT-7 Saxhorn, a Soviet wire-guided Anti-tank missile system
- Beechcraft Model 18, a.k.a. AT-7 Navigator, a World War II training aircraft
- Hexachlorophene, an organic chemical that was used as an antiseptic and also in agriculture
