= 9M113 Konkurs =

Soviet anti-tank missile

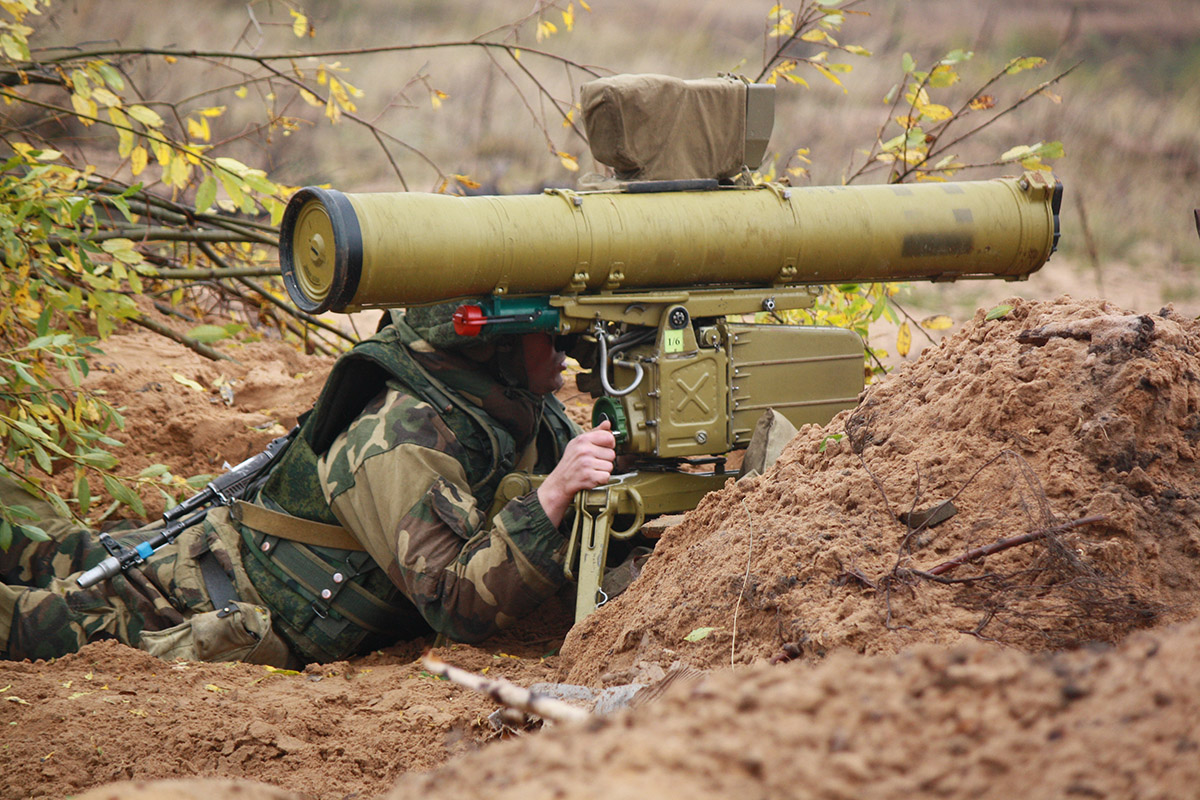
- 9M113 Konkurs in Belarusian service
- Type: Anti-tank missile
- Place of origin: Soviet Union

Service history
- In service: 1974–present
- Used by: See operators
- Wars: Syrian Civil War; War in Iraq (2013-2017); War in Donbas; Yemeni Civil War (2014-present); Saudi-led intervention in Yemen; 2020 Nagorno-Karabakh conflict Russo-Ukrainian War

Production history
- Designed: 1970
- Manufacturer: Tula Machinery Design Bureau (Tula KBP) – Tulsky Oruzheiny Zavod; Bharat Dynamics Limited
- Variants: 9M113M

Specifications
- Mass: 14.6 kg (32 lb) (Missile weight); 22.5 kg (50 lbs) (9P135 launching post)
- Length: 1,150 mm (45 in); 875 mm (34.4 in) without gas generator
- Diameter: 135 mm (5.3 in)
- Wingspan: 468 mm (18.4 in)
- Warhead: 2.7 kg (6.0 lb) 9N131 HEAT
- Detonation mechanism: Contact
- Engine: Solid-fuel rocket
- Operational range: 70 m (230 ft) to 4 km (2.5 mi)
- Maximum speed: 208 m/s (680 ft/s)
- Guidance system: Wire-guided SACLOS
- Steering system: Two control surfaces
- Launch platform: Individual, vehicle

The 9M113 Konkurs (Russian: Конкурс, lit. 'Contest'; NATO reporting name: AT-5 Spandrel) is a Soviet SACLOS wire-guided anti-tank missile.

A development of the 9K111 Fagot with greater firepower, the 9M113 Konkurs can use the same launchers and is very similar visually, distinguishable only by a slight bulge towards the end of the Konkurs' missile tube.

== Development ==
The 9M113 Konkurs was developed by the Tula Machinery Design Bureau (Tula KBP). Development began with the aim of producing the next generation of SACLOS anti-tank missiles, for use in both the man-portable role and the tank destroyer role. The 9M113 Konkurs was developed alongside the 9M111; the missiles use similar technology, differing only in size.

The original 9M113 with a single-charge warhead can penetrate 600 mm of rolled homogeneous armor (RHA).

The missile entered service in 1974. Iran bought a license for the Konkurs in 1991 and began producing a copy, the Tosan (not to be confused with the Toophan), sometime around 2000.

In 1992, the export price of a 9M113 missile was $13,000 United States dollars and the price of a 9P135M launcher was $135,000.

== Design ==
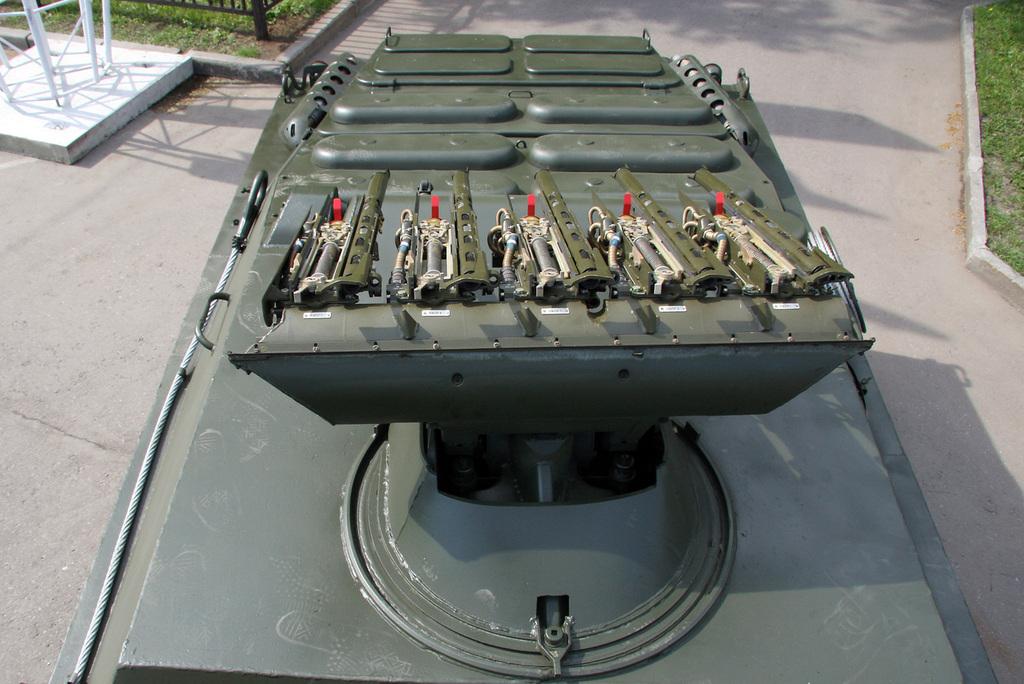
9M113 Konkurs launching rails on the top of 9P148 vehicle

The missile is designed to be fired from tracked/wheeled vehicles, although it can also be fired from the later models of 9M111 launchers. It is an integral part of the BMP-2, BMD-2 and BRDM-2 vehicles. The missile is stored and carried in a fiberglass container/launch tube.

The system uses a gas generator to push the missile out of the launch tube. The gas also exits from the rear of the launch tube in a similar manner to a recoilless rifle. The missile leaves the launch tube at 80 meters per second, and is quickly accelerated to 200 meters per second by its solid fuel motor. This initial high speed reduces the missile's deadzone, since it can be launched directly at the target, rather than in an upward arc. In flight, the missile spins at between five and seven revolutions per second.

The launcher tracks the position of an incandescent infrared bulb on the back of the missile relative to the target and transmits appropriate commands to the missile via a thin wire that trails behind the missile. The system has an alarm that activates when it detects jamming from a system like Shtora. The operator can then take manual control, reducing the missile to MCLOS. The SACLOS guidance system has many benefits over MCLOS. The system's accuracy is quoted in some sources as 90%, though its performance is probably comparable to the BGM-71 TOW or later SACLOS versions of the 9K11 Malyutka.

== Models ==
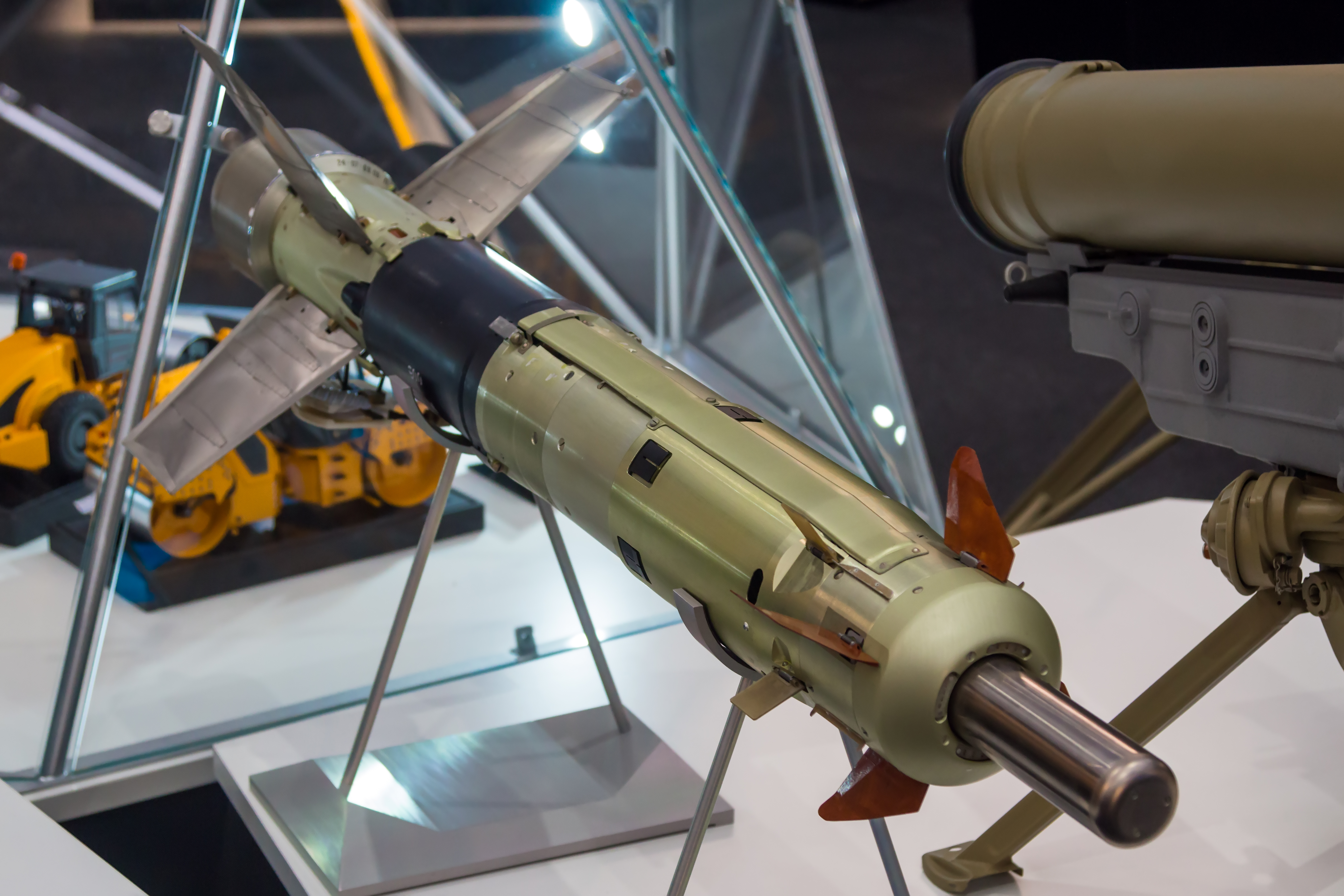
9M113M ATGM for Konkurs-M

- 9M113 Konkurs (NATO: AT-5 Spandrel, AT-5A Spandrel A)
- 9M113M Konkurs-M (NATO: AT-5B Spandrel B) Tandem warhead – with extended explosive probe. The warhead penetration is 750–800 mm vs RHA. Adopted in 1991. Missile 9M113M 1990. Tandem (800 mm (behind a layer of ERA)). 4,000 m (3500 m night (passive)).
- Towsan-1, Tosan, Towsan, or M113: Iranian licensed 9M113M Konkurs-M (AT-5B Spandrel B) copy. Introduced in early 2000. Unclear if still in production. Used primarily by paratroopers and armored vehicles.
- 9N131M1 – Warhead, upgraded version.
- 9N131M2-1 – Warhead, the newest upgraded version.

== Operators ==
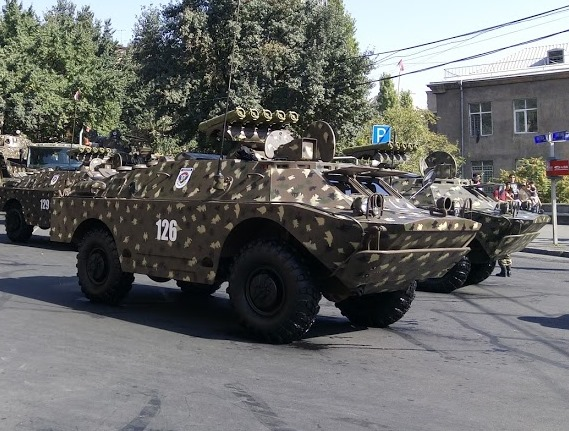
Armenian 9P148 Konkurs in Yerevan

=== Current operators ===
- Afghanistan
- Algeria
- Armenia Indian-made version being acquired by Armenia.
- Azerbaijan
- Belarus The launcher has been locally produced and upgraded. Procured the upgraded 9M113M [AT-5 Spandrel] ATGMs and delivered them to the troops. An upgraded version of the missile with new electronics, a laser guidance system and increased range was flight-tested in October 2026.
- Bulgaria: Known to be produced by VMZ Sopot.
- Croatia
- Czech Republic
- Egypt Mostly purchased in 1990s and captured from ISIS members; Used on DMS-K
- Eritrea
- Georgia
- Guinea
- Hungary Under gradual replacement by Spike LR2.
- India – 15,000 Konkurs-M were ordered in 2008 from Russia for ₹1,380 crore (US$317.21 million). Another 10,000 Konkurs-M was cleared for US$250 million in 2012. Additional contracts was signed on 8 January 2019 and 2 February 2022 for ₹7.6 billion (US$107.92 million) and ₹3,131.82 crore (US$398.43 million), respectively. The latter was to be executed within 3 years at BDL's Bhanur facility. BDL reportedly produces the 9K111-1M system with a 9M113 anti-tank missile and a 9P135M-1 launcher. Used on BMP-2 Sarath as well as man-portable ground launcher.
- Iran – produced domestically as Tosan (missile)
- Ivory Coast (reported)
- Kazakhstan
- Kyrgyzstan
- Libya
- Morocco
- Moldova – used on BRDM-2
- Montenegro
- North Korea
- Pakistan – Used on Viper infantry fighting vehicle
- Poland
- Romania
- Russia – about 300 Konkurs-M complexes delivered annually in the last years (2014)
- Slovakia
- Turkmenistan
- Syria
- Ukraine
- Vietnam
- United Arab Emirates

=== Former operators ===
- Chechen Republic of Ichkeria − 2 in 1992
- East Germany – Passed on to the reunified German state, and later phased out of service.
- Czechoslovakia – 80 in 1989. Passed on to successor states.
- Finland
- Soviet Union – Passed on to successor states.

=== Non-state operators ===
- Hamas – Known to be used against Israeli armored vehicles.
- Hezbollah
- Houthis – Tosan version.
- Islamic State
- Kurdistan: Peshmerga
- Kurdistan Workers' Party
- People's Defense Units (YPG)
- (Syria) Syrian National Army
- Tahrir al-Sham

== See also ==
- 9M133 Kornet
- List of Russian weaponry

== Sources ==
- German, Tracey C. (2003). Russia's Chechen War. Routledge. ISBN 978-1-134-43250-9.
- Hull, A.W., Markov, D.R., Zaloga, S.J. (1999). Soviet/Russian Armor and Artillery Design Practices 1945 to Present. Darlington Productions. ISBN 1-892848-01-5.
- International Institute for Strategic Studies (February 2016). The Military Balance 2016. Vol. 116. Routledge. ISBN 9781857438352.
