= RAAD (anti-tank guided missile) =

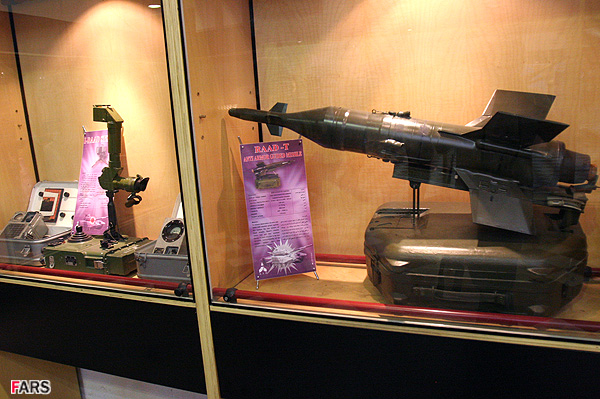
- RAAD-T
- Type: Anti-tank missile
- Place of origin: Iran

Service history
- In service: 1988–present
- Used by: See Operators
- Wars: 2006 Lebanon War; Syrian Civil War; Iraqi Civil War

Production history
- Designer: KBM
- Manufacturer: Parchin Missile Industries
- No. built: 4,500 (2015)
- Variants: See Variants

Specifications
- Mass: 10.9 kg (RAAD/I-RAAD); 23 kg (guidance System)
- Length: 83 cm (RAAD/I-RAAD); 98 cm (RAAD-T/I-RAAD-T)
- Effective firing range: 400–3,000 m
- Warhead: HEAT
- Blast yield: 400 mm RHA (I-RAAD-T)
- Maximum speed: 120 m/s
- Guidance system: MCLOS or SACLOS

The Raad (Persian: رعد, 'thunder') or RAAD is an Iranian wire-guided anti-tank guided missile based on the Soviet 9M14M Malyutka (AT-3b Sagger) missile. The Raad began mass production in 1988 and was publicly unveiled in 1997. It is manufactured by Parchin Missile Industries, a subsidiary of Iran's Defense Industries Organization.

The Raad family comes in four variants: the base RAAD missile, a clone of the 9M14M Malyutka-M (AT-3b Sagger); the I-RAAD, with SACLOS guidance, the RAAD-T, with a tandem warhead, and the I-RAAD-T, with both a tandem warhead and SACLOS guidance.

RAAD means thunder in Persian. It is not an acronym and many sources do not capitalize the name.

== History ==
During the Iran-Iraq War, Iran had an acute need for anti-tank missiles, necessitating the country to buy AT-3 Sagger missiles. Iran also acquired the HJ-73, the Chinese version of the Sagger.

Indigenous manufacturing work began in the tail end of the war and mass production began in 1998, with the Raad being the first anti-tank guided weapon to be built by Iran. The RAAD was obtained with Russian assistance.

The weapon was unveiled on April 30, 1997. The RAAD has almost identical components with 9M14 Malyutka, from the battery to the guidance unit.

According to SIPRI, 1500 RAAD/Sagger missiles were built or imported by Iran between 1996 and 2001 and 2,250 from 1996 to 2004.

As of 2015, 4,500 RAADs were made in Iran.

== Combat use ==
Iran supplied Hezbollah with the Raad in the early 2000s and Hezbollah used Raad missiles in the 2006 Lebanon War. Israel captured ten baseline RAAD missiles on the Karine A in January 2002.

The Raad has been used in the Syrian Civil War by Hezbollah fighters, and the Syrian Army. I-RAAD missiles have been used by ISIL fighters in Iraq.

On October 7, 2023, Al-Quds Brigades militants used a RAAD-T during the raid on Israel from Gaza.

== Variants ==
=== RAAD ===
The RAAD is an identical copy of the 9M14M Malyutka-M (NATO AT-3b "Sagger").

=== RAAD-T ===
The first improvement of the RAAD missile, the RAAD-T has a tandem warhead to defeat explosive Reactive Armor. However, the RAAD-T still uses the obsolete MCLOS guidance of the original RAAD. According to its export material, the RAAD-T has improved maneuverability over the base RAAD and has 400 mm RHA penetration after reactive armor.

=== I-RAAD ===
For Improved RAAD, the I-RAAD has a different launcher with a tripod-mounted SACLOS guidance system that makes the missile much easier to aim. The specific SACLOS method is a TV differential tracker. The guidance unit is similar to that of the Chinese HJ-73 system, and possibly the HJ-73C model in particular. First seen in 1998. RAAD missiles can be used by I-RAAD launchers.

It's used to defeat ERA armor.

=== I-RAAD-T ===
The I-RAAD-T system combines the tandem-warhead of the RAAD-T missile with the SACLOS guidance system of the I-RAAD launcher. RAAD and I-RAAD missiles can be retrofitted to the I-RAAD-T standard. The I-RAAD-T also includes a simulator that allows operators to be trained on the system without actually firing a missile. 400 mm RHA penetration after reactive armor.

The front end can be used on other RAAD or 9M14 Malyutka missiles.

== Operators ==
- Iran
- Syria

=== Non-State actors ===
- Al-Quds Brigades
- Hezbollah
- Islamic State: Acquired I-RAADs.

== Bibliography ==
- Jones, Richard D.; Ness, Leland S., eds. (2010). Jane's Infantry Weapons 2010-2011. Jane's Publishing. ISBN 978-0710629081.
