= DMS-K =

Egyptian dual missile platform

DMS-K dual missile platform is an Egyptian anti-tank missile carrier based on the Toyota Land Cruiser 79 Single Cab pick-up. It employs the 9M113M Konkurs-M missiles. It was unveiled at the EDEX 2023 and developed by the Arab International Optronics in cooperation with the Arab Organization for Industrialization, tailored for special forces. It can carry up to eight missiles.

== Design ==
The system is intended for engaging main battle tanks and light armoured vehicles on the front lines. It is a highly effective anti-tank system that takes advantage of the rapid mobility and maneuverability of the Toyota Land Cruiser vehicle, as well as its ability to move on difficult terrains.

The system has two missiles ready for use with capability for two missile launches before reloading, with full control possible from inside the vehicle. The system retains the capabilities of the Konkurs ATGM, ensuring precise target engagement within a range of up to 4 km. The system also offers the functionality to record firings for subsequent analysis.

The system has a horizontal movement limit of 270° and a vertical movement range from -5° to 10°. It achieves readiness in 3 seconds following an automatic self-check, with a 2-second preparation time for launching a second missile. Operating on 12 volts/10 amperes, the system weighs 250 kg and features a 10x zoom capability with HDMI resolution.

Egypt is one of the largest operators of the Konkurs ATGM system in the region, having acquired more than 10,000 missiles from the Soviet Union since the 1980s. The country also produces its own version of the missile, called the Sakr.

Operating through a semi-automatic control system, with command transmission via wires, the missile offers a maximum range of 4,000 m and a minimum range of 100 m, day or night. The Konkurs-M variant includes a tandem warhead with an extended nose probe designed to neutralize explosive reactive armor (ERA) before activating the main warhead. It is guided by both semi-automatic and wire-guided guidance system. It can effectively neutralize 750-800 mm armour even behind ERA.

The Konkurs-equipped Land Cruiser will best serve mechanized troops in support of an armoured formation against enemy troops with heavy armoured presence.

The associated launcher unit, 9P135, is a tripod launcher that can be pintle-mounted on vehicles, as showcased by the DMS-K system. Additional accessories, such as the thermal imager 1PN65, can be integrated for engagements at ranges up to 2,500 m. The system incorporates features like an incandescent infrared bulb for tracking, an alarm system to detect jamming, and the capability for manual control if necessary.

== Operators ==
- Egypt
