= 9K115-1 Metis-M =

Metis-M / Metis-M1
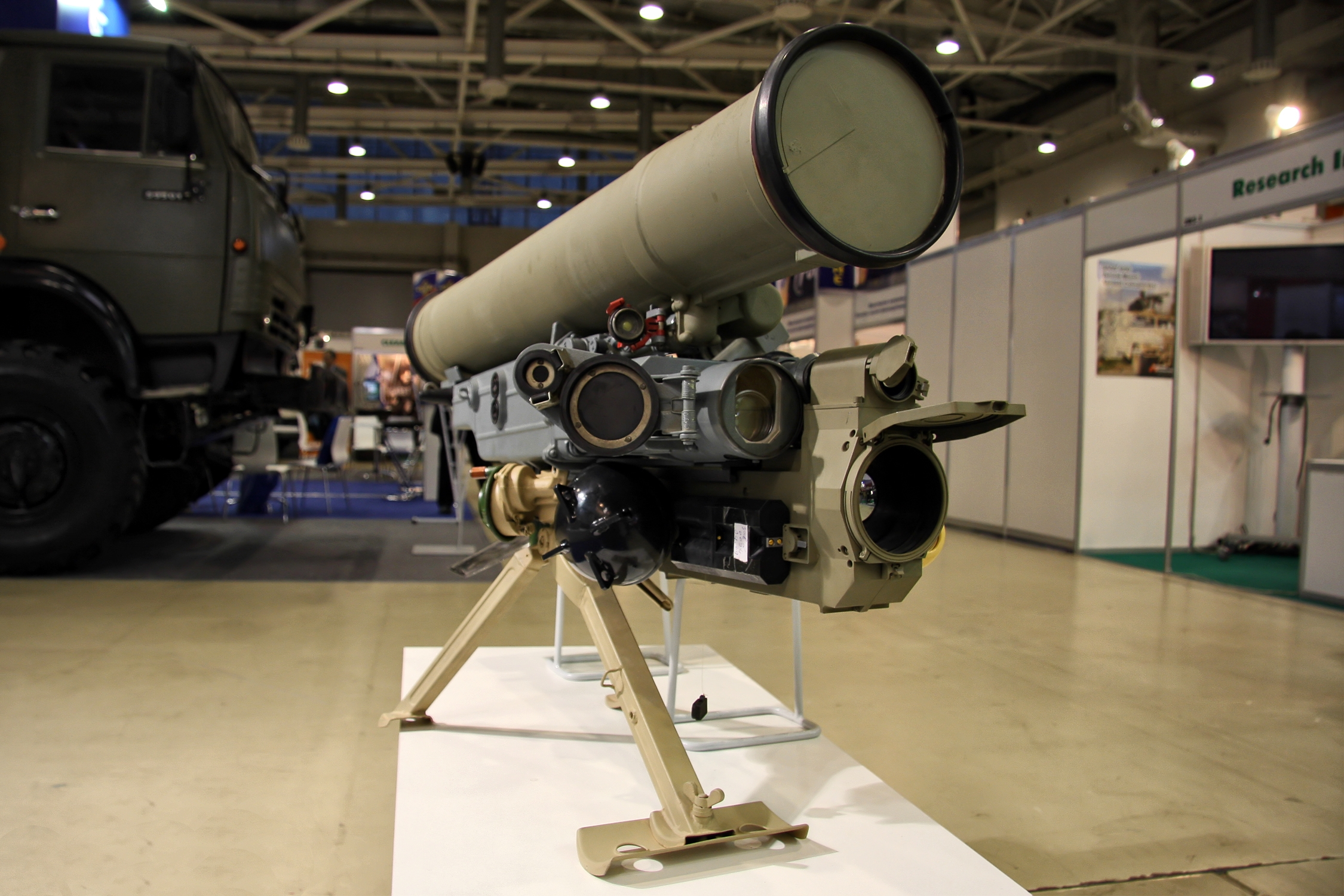
- Anti-tank missile Metis-M1
- Type: Anti-tank guided missile
- Place of origin: Russia

Service history
- In service: 1992–present
- Used by: See Operators
- Wars: 2006 Lebanon War; Syrian Civil War; War in Iraq (2013-2017)

Production history
- Manufacturer: KBP Instrument Design Bureau
- Unit cost: $15,500 per missile (2019, export cost)
- Produced: 1992–present

Specifications
- Mass: Missile in launch tube: 13.8 kg Launcher: 10.2 kg (Metis-M), 9.5 kg (Metis-M1); Thermal sight: 6.5 kg
- Length: 980 mm
- Diameter: 130 mm
- Warhead: HEAT tandem warhead, Armor penetration behind ERA: 800 mm (Metis-M); 900-980 mm (Metis-M1) thermobaric anti-personnel/anti-material warhead is also available
- Engine: Solid-fuel rocket
- Operational range: 1500 m (Metis-M); 80 m - 2000 m (Metis-M1)
- Maximum speed: 200 m/s
- Guidance system: SACLOS wire-guided missile

The 9K115-1 Metis-M (NATO reporting name AT-13 Saxhorn-2) is a Russian portable anti-tank guided missile system. It is the next major generation in the 9K115 Metis family. The 9K115-2 Metis-M1 is the latest upgraded variant of Metis-M. The system is designed to augment the combat power of company-level motorized units.

== Overview ==
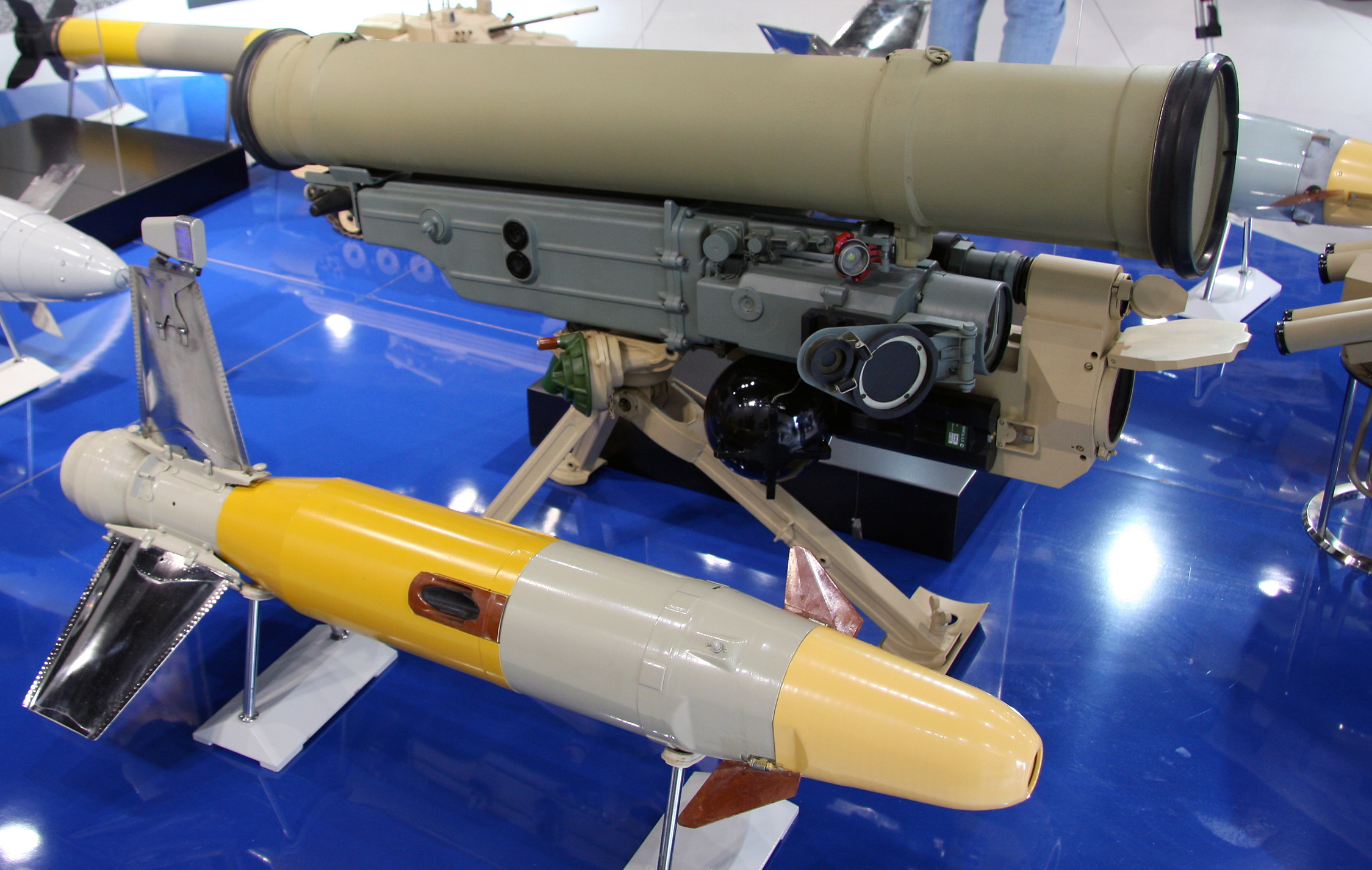
Metis-M1 system with anti-tank missile

The Metis-M/M1 system adds to the usual positive qualities of a man-portable anti-tank guided missile with significant improvements in range, accuracy and lethality. Owing to the small dimensions and light weight of its components, this manportable system can be carried by its crew in compact packs over any distance and over a wide variety of terrain types, including stream crossing. The three-man crew carries personal weapons and an ammunition load of five missiles. One crew member carries a pack with a missile-loaded launcher, which considerably reduces the time of fire preparation and allows the crew to engage targets whilst moving. In the event of sudden appearance of a target, the operator can fire from the shoulder with the launcher rested against a local object. The two other crew members each carry a pack with two missiles.

=== Guidance ===
The Metis-M/M1 ATGM system has a semi-automatic missile guidance, with commands transmitted over a wire link. The guidance system is constructed so that the most sophisticated and costly components, such as a gyroscopic coordinator, electronic units and an onboard battery, are excluded from the missile.

=== Features ===
- changes from the traveling to the firing position—and vice versa—in 15 – 20 seconds;
- firing rate of 3 - 4 rounds per minute;
- fired from organized and deployed sites in the prone and standing foxhole positions, as well as from combat vehicles;
- can be shipped by any type of transport and can be air-dropped.

The Metis-M/M1 system comprises:

- combat assets;
- maintenance facilities;
- training aids.

The combat assets of the Metis-M/M1 system include:

- 9M131 ATGM; 9M131M and 9M131F ATGM for Metis-M1.
- 9P151 launcher; 9P151M launcher for Metis-M1.
- 1PN86BVI thermal sight for Metis-M1.

=== Metis-M1 ===
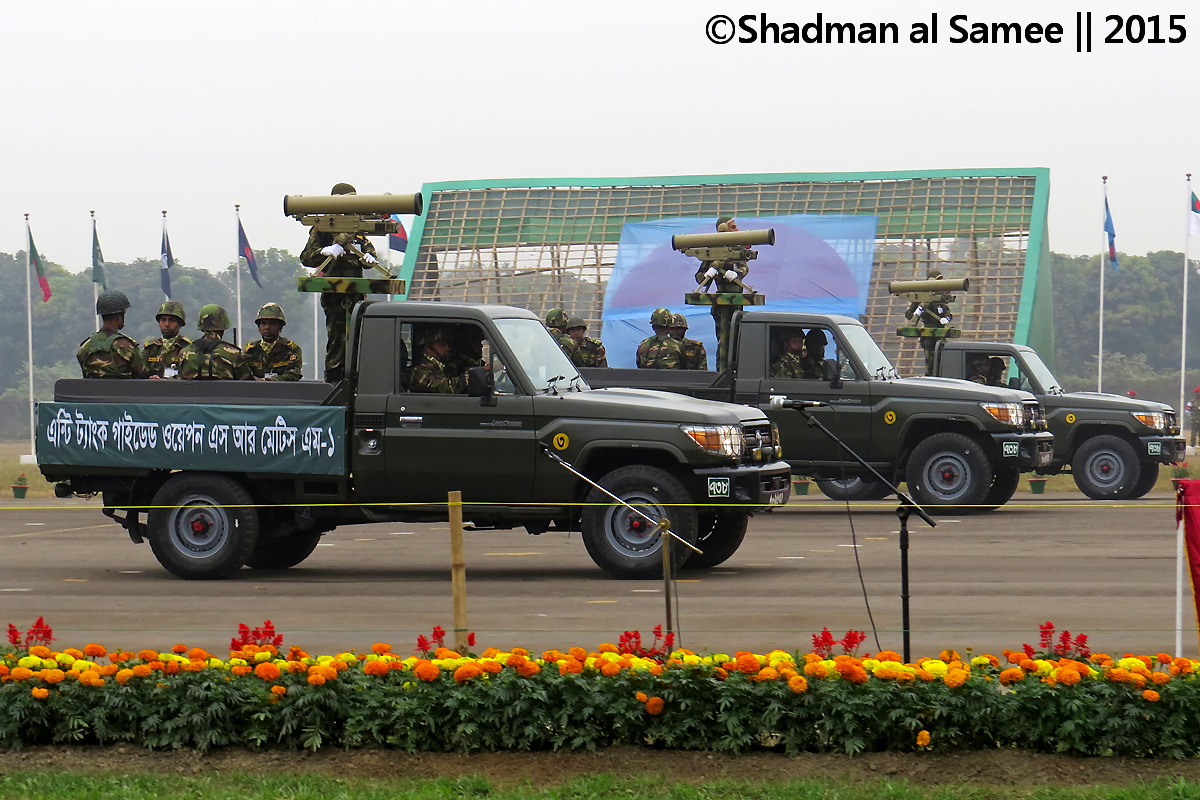
Bangladesh Army Metis-M1

Metis-M1 is the upgraded variant of Metis-M. The new version has greater range of two kilometres (1.2 mi), more armor penetration of 900–980 mm (35–39 in), and reduced weight. It is designed to destroy main battle tanks with Active Protection Systems and Explosive Reactive Armor (ERA), light armored vehicles, fortifications, and other targets in day or night and in any weather condition.

In 2013, the Bangladesh Army received a large amount of Metis-M1 anti-tank missile systems along with 1,200 missiles. In November 2015, Russia revealed it was formalizing the introduction of the Metis-M1, which entered service with Russia on 2 March 2016.

== Operational history ==
=== Lebanon ===
According to accounts by the Israel Defense Forces concerning weapons seized from Hezbollah and from journalists' accounts from Lebanon, the Metis-M was used successfully by Hezbollah fighters during the 2006 Lebanon war against Merkava tanks. Israel has sent a team of officials to Moscow to show the Russians the evidence of what they say can only be Syrian weapons transfers. To date, Russia has not commented on the weapon proliferation, although it has moved to tighten control over the use of Russian-made weapons by the importing states.

=== South Korea ===
South Korea purchased 220 Metis-M in two orders—70 in 1995 (Project Brown Bear I) and 150 in 2005 (Project Brown Bear II)—and acquired 9,000 missiles as of 2006. According to the tests, Metis-M was capable of penetrating 850 mm of RHA, providing great firepower for a weapon operated by 2 soldiers. However, between 2009 and 2011, the South Korean Army fired 17 missiles for testing, and 10 missiles either missed the target or didn't ignite the warhead upon impact (60% failure). After temporarily removing Metis-M from active service, the Army, the Agency for Defense Development, and the Defense Acquisition Program Administration test fired 43 missiles and achieved 41 hits (7% failure). The joint inspection team hypothesized faulty electronics on the guiding system or failing to maintain in good custody. However, they were not able to identify the cause of the issue, and Metis-M was put back into active service.

=== Syria ===
On 7 March 2012, Free Syrian Army fighters used a 9K115-2 Metis-M anti-tank guided missile to hit a derelict Syrian Air Force MiG-23MS. Later, during the Syrian Civil War, its use became widespread. Insurgents used it with great success, together with other ATGMs, against different targets, including tanks, infantry fighting vehicles, trucks and firing posts with many videos uploaded on to the internet. Initially, Metis missiles originated from looted Syrian Army depots, while later external suppliers could have been involved.

It was confirmed that Bulgaria has sold six sets of 9K115-2 Metis via the United States to Syrian rebels.

== Operators ==
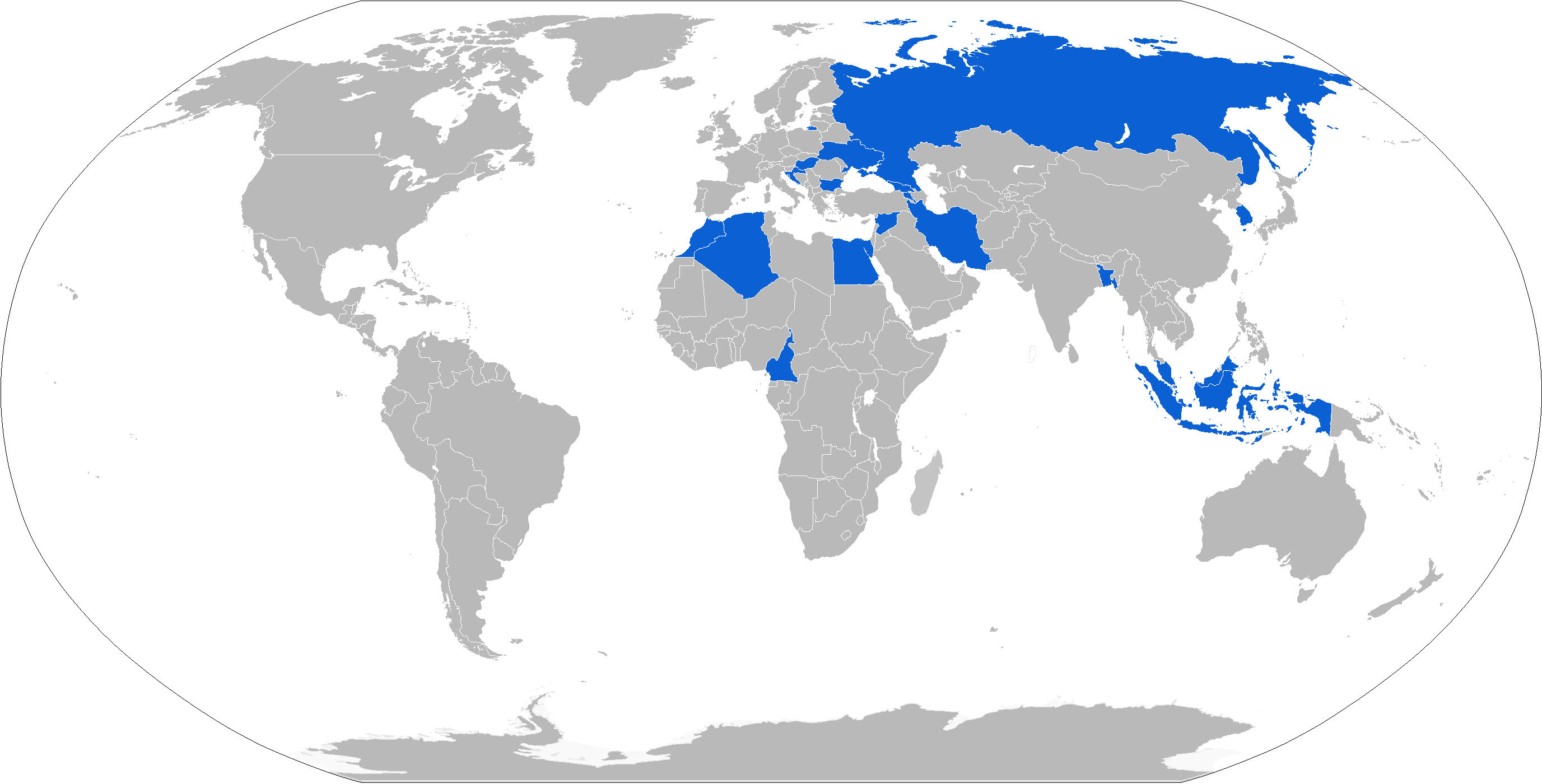
Map with 9K115-2 operators in blue

=== Current operators ===
- Algeria
- Bangladesh: Metis-M1 systems along with 1,200 missiles supplied to Bangladesh Army in 2013.

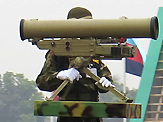
The Bangladesh Army is one of the largest users of Metis-M1.

- Croatia
- Egypt
- Georgia
- Hungary
- Indonesia
- Iran
- Iraq
- Malaysia: 100 in inventory.
- Morocco
- Russia: Used by ground and airborne units.
- South Korea: Received Metis-M as debt payment from Russia.
- Syria
- Ukraine

=== Non-state actors ===
- Donetsk People's Republic
- (Syria) Free Syrian Army
- Hezbollah
- Houthis
- Islamic State
- People's Defense Units (YPG)
- Tahrir al-Sham: Metis-M systems used
- FUNCINPEC:used during the 1997 Cambodian coup

== See also ==
- 9K115 Metis – (Soviet Union, Russia)
- FGM-148 Javelin – (United States)
- OMTAS – (Turkey)
- Karaok – (Turkey)
- NLAW – (Sweden, United Kingdom)
- BGM-71 TOW – (United States)
- Shershen – (Belarus)
- List of Russian weaponry
