= 9K115 Metis =

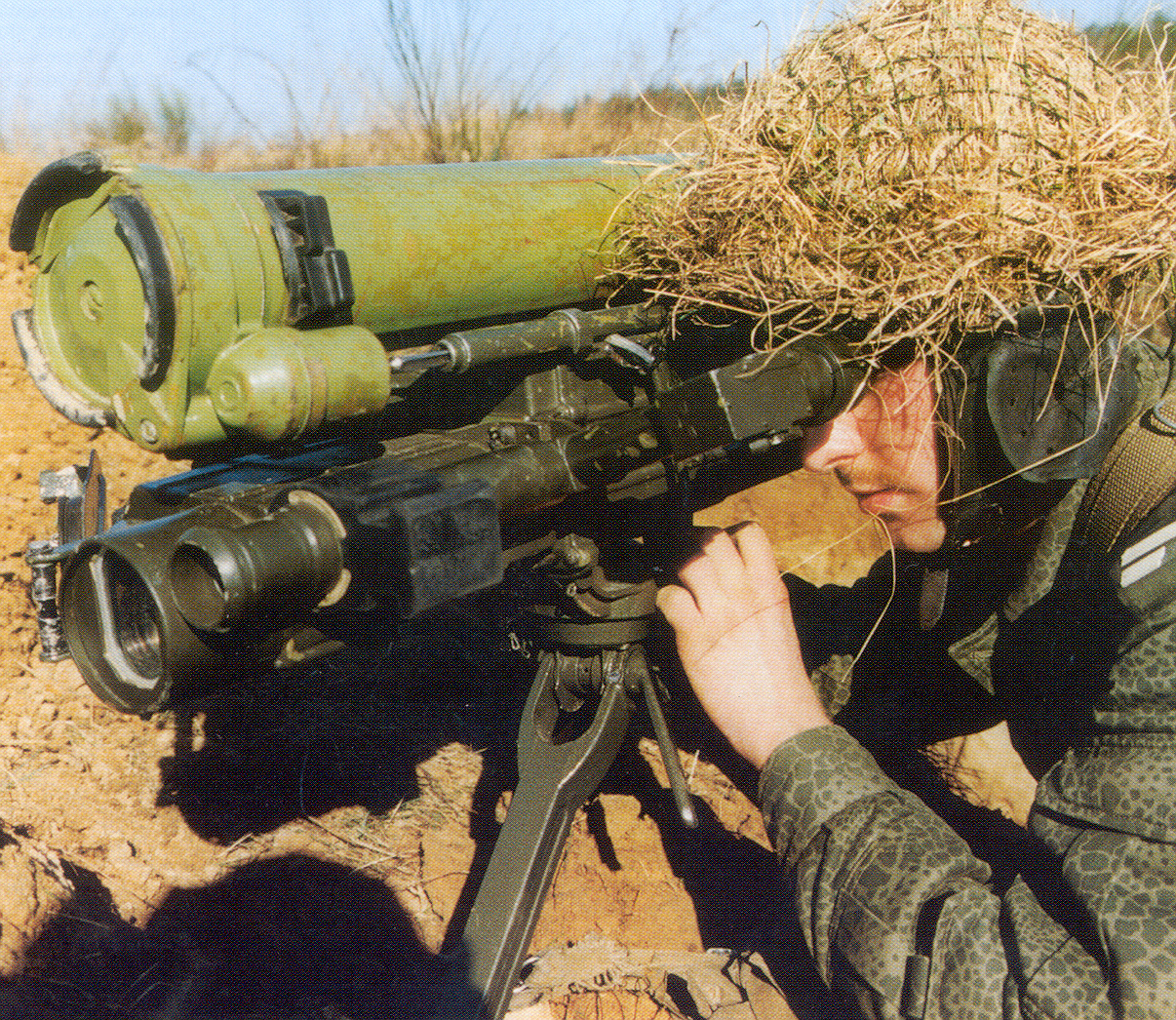
- 9K115 Metis being operated by a Polish soldier
- Type: Anti-tank missile
- Place of origin: Soviet Union

Service history
- In service: 1979–present
- Wars: Syrian civil war Yemeni Civil War (2014–present); Saudi Arabian-led intervention in Yemen

Production history
- Manufacturer: KBP Instrument Design Bureau
- Produced: 1978–present
- Variants: 9K115-2 Metis-M

Specifications
- Mass: 5.5 kg (12 lb); 6.3 kg (14 lb) (w/ container); 10.2 kg (launching post)
- Length: 740 mm (29 in)
- Diameter: 94 mm (4 in)
- Wingspan: 300 mm (12 in)
- Warhead: HEAT shaped charge
- Warhead weight: 2.5 kg (5.5 lb)
- Operational range: 40–1,000 m (130–3,280 ft)
- Maximum speed: 223 m/s (732 ft/s)
- Guidance system: Wire-guided SACLOS

The 9K115 Metis (NATO reporting name AT-7 Saxhorn) is a man-portable, tube launched, SACLOS wire-guided anti-tank guided missile of the Soviet Union. It is considered the Soviet counterpart to the American M47 Dragon ATGM.

The relatively small 9K115 missile was generally underpowered compared to contemporary armored threats, and consequently it was little-exported and little used in combat.

== Development ==
The missile was developed by the Tula KBP. It is very similar to the 9K111 Fagot in external appearance (having three main fins); however, the missile is much lighter—primarily because of the reduced fuel load, which reduces the maximum range to 1,000 metres (3,300 ft).

During the 1980s, an upgraded version of the system was developed—the 9K115-1 Metis-M complex with 9M131 ATGM. Fired from the same 9P151 launcher, the new missile is much larger and heavier, with an increased range and a larger warhead. The NATO designation for this missile is AT-13 Saxhorn-2.

== History ==
The missile was introduced into the Soviet Army in 1979 to supplement the 9K111 Fagot at company level. The system is lighter than the Fagot system, due to a less complicated tripod launcher and a lighter missile.

In Russian service, the Metis is deployed with motor rifle companies, with three launchers per company. The missile is operated by a two-man team; the gunner carries the 9P151 launching post and one missile, his assistant carries an additional three missiles. The AT-7 can be operated by one man if needed.

== Models ==
- 9K115 (NATO: AT-7 Saxhorn) – Entered service in 1978.
- 9K115-1 Metis-M (NATO: AT-13 Saxhorn-2) – Entered service in 1992. New tandem cumulative 9M131 ATGM, retaining same 9P151 launcher. Possible of mounting 1PN86BVI thermal sight.
- 9K115-2 Metis-M1 (NATO: AT-13 Saxhorn-2) – Exported since 2004. New tandem cumulative 9M131M and thermobaric 9M131F ATGM, lightened 9P151M launcher. Possible of mounting 1PN86BVI thermal sight.

== Description ==
The missile is fired from the 9P151 launching post, which has a simple tripod for support. It can also be fired from the shoulder, but this apparently requires more skill on the part of the operator. The launching post weighs 10.2 kilograms (22 lb). The missile is launched from the tube by a booster rather than the gas generator used on the 9K111 Fagot system, despite both missiles being designed by the same design bureau. The 9S816 guidance system is powered by a thermal battery attached to the launch tube shortly before launch and the missile itself is remotely powered along the guidance wires.

The missile can be launched from an enclosed space, such as a building or cave, but requires at least 6 metres (20 ft) behind the launcher, and a total internal volume of at least 100 cubic metres (3,500 ft^{3}). The missile has a short minimum range of 40 metres (130 ft) and can engage targets moving at up to 60 kilometres per hour (37 mph).

The missile's warhead is a single HEAT shaped charge that can penetrate 460 mm of armor.

== Operators ==
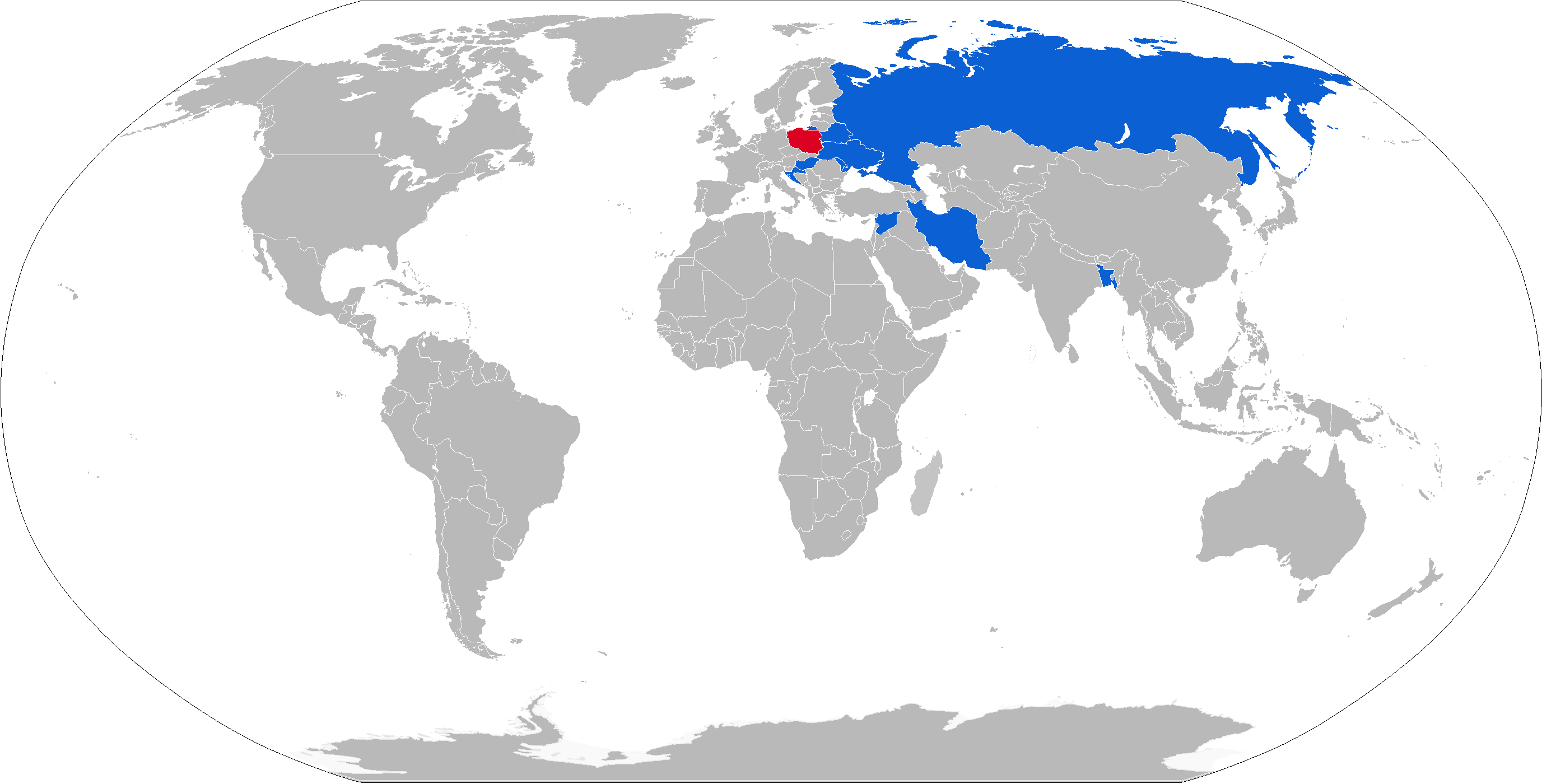
Operators Current Former

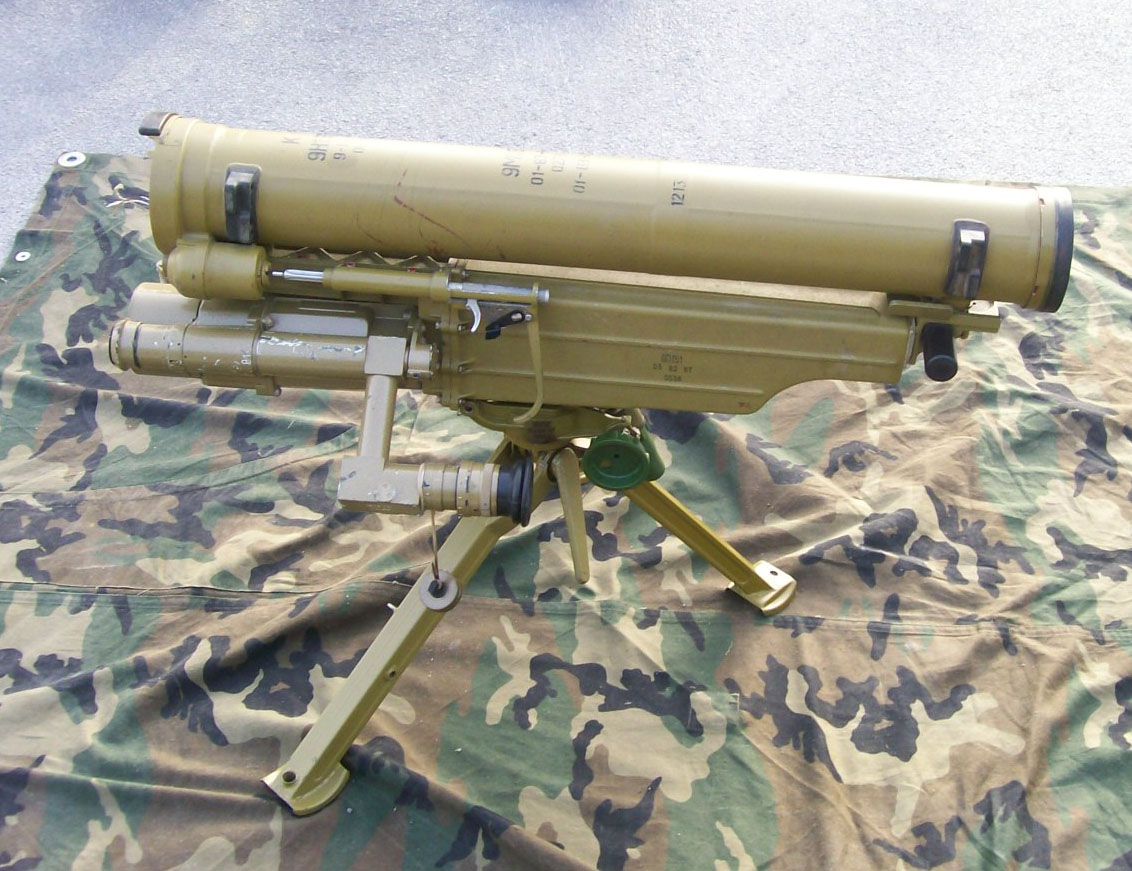
Croatian 9K115 Metis

=== Current operators ===
- Azerbaijan
- Bangladesh (Metis-M1)
- Belarus
- Bosnia and Herzegovina
- Croatia
- Hezbollah
- Kazakhstan
- Libya
- Malaysia
- North Korea
- Russia
- Turkmenistan
- Ukraine
  - Luhansk People's Republic
- South Sudan
- Syria
- Yemen (Houthis)

=== Former operators ===
- Bulgaria
- Chechen Republic of Ichkeria − 51 in 1992.
- East Germany
