= 9K111 Fagot =

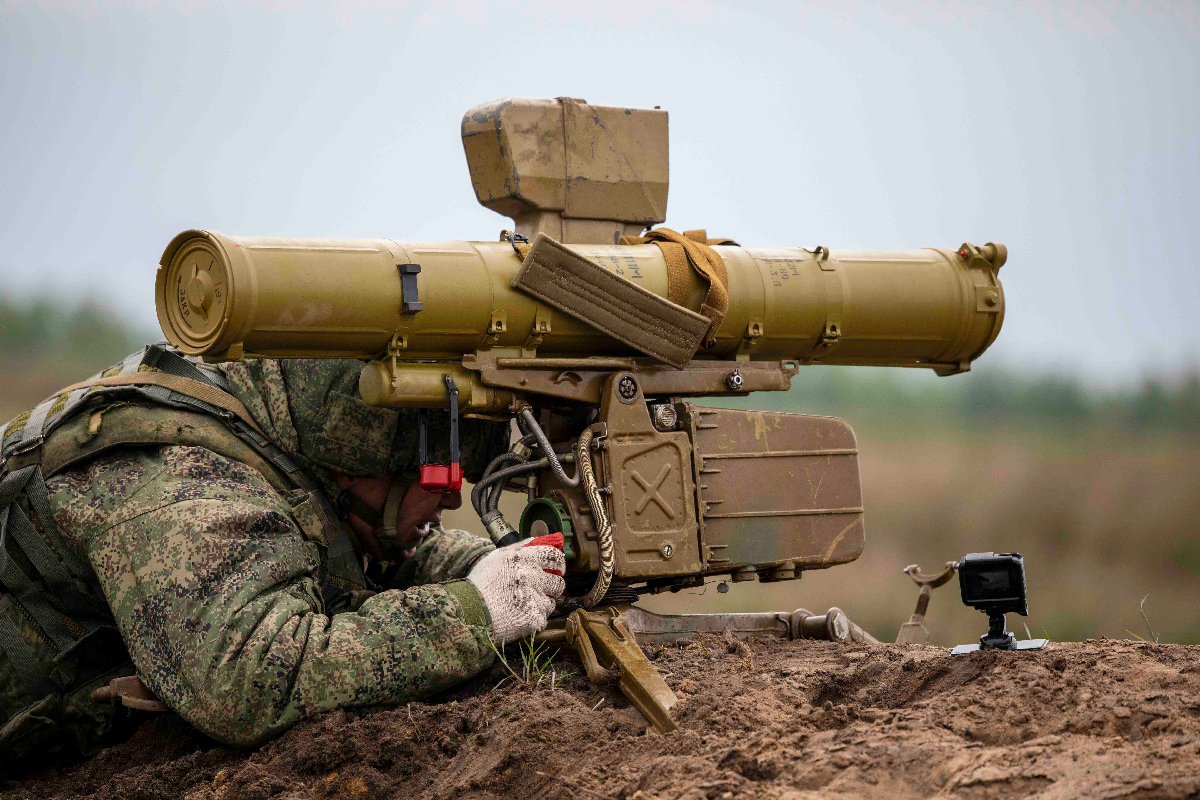
- 9K111 Fagot in Russian service
- Type: Anti-tank weapon
- Place of origin: Soviet Union

Service history
- In service: 1970–present
- Used by: See Operators
- Wars: Soviet–Afghan War; Iran–Iraq War; Western Sahara War; Second Chechen War; Kargil War; War in Afghanistan (2001–2021); Russo-Georgian War; Iraq War; Syrian Civil War; War in Iraq (2013-2017); War in Donbas; Yemeni Civil War (2014–present) Saudi-led intervention in Yemen; Houthi–Saudi Arabian conflict; 2020 Nagorno-Karabakh conflict; Russo-Ukrainian war; Gaza war

Production history
- Designer: Tula Machinery Design Bureau (Tula KBP)
- Designed: 1962
- Produced: 1970
- Variants: See Models

Specifications
- Mass: 12.5 kg (28 lb) (missile weight); 22.5 kg (50 lb) (9P135 launching post)
- Length: 1,100 mm (3 ft 7 in)
- Diameter: 120 mm (4.7 in)
- Action: 400 mm versus RHA or 200 mm toward armour inclined at 60°
- Rate of fire: 3 rds / min
- Muzzle velocity: 80 m/s (180 mph; 290 km/h) at launch; 186 m/s (420 mph; 670 km/h) in flight speed
- Effective firing range: 70–2,500 m (230–8,200 ft)
- Warhead: High-explosive anti-tank (HEAT) warhead
- Warhead weight: 1.7 kg (3.7 lb)
- Guidance system: SACLOS wire-guided missile

The 9K111 Fagot (Russian: Фагот, lit. 'bassoon') is a second-generation tube-launched semi-automatic command to line of sight (SACLOS) wire-guided anti-tank missile system of the Soviet Union for use from ground or vehicle mounts. The 9K111 Fagot missile system was developed by the Tula KBP Design Bureau for Instrument Building. 9M111 is the designation for the missile. Its NATO reporting name is AT-4 Spigot.

== Development ==
The 9K111 Fagot was developed by the Tula Machinery Design Bureau (Tula KBP), with its development commencing in 1962. The primary aim was to create a next-generation SACLOS (Semi-Automatic Command to Line of Sight) anti-tank guided missile (ATGM) suitable for use in two key roles: as a highly portable weapon for individual soldiers and as an effective tank destroyer. The 9K111 Fagot was developed in parallel with the 9M113 Konkurs; both missile systems share very similar technological foundations, differing primarily in their size, which allows them to utilize the same launch platforms. The Fagot was designed to be user-friendly and effective in combat situations, ensuring that infantry units could operate it with minimal training. After undergoing testing and refinement, the missile officially entered service in 1970, marking a significant advancement in anti-tank capability for Soviet forces.

== History ==
The anti-tank platoon of a Soviet BTR equipped motor rifle battalion had two (sometimes three) ATGM squads, each with two 9K111 Fagot teams. The team consisted of three men; the gunner carries the 9P135 launcher and tripod as a back pack, and the other two men each carry two launch tubes. The men also carry assault rifles, but do not carry a rocket-propelled grenade (RPG), because, unlike the earlier missiles, there is only a small deadzone within which the missile cannot engage the target. Besides the four missiles carried by each team, each squad would normally have an extra eight missiles carried in their transport, usually a BTR. It can also be deployed from the BMP-1P, BTR-D and UAZ-469.

North Korea was said to have acquired a number of the systems during the late 1980s until the 2000s. These were subsequently reverse-engineered under the designation Bulsae-2. It was advertised under designation AT-4MLB by North Korean proxy company GLOCOM, in brochure it was stated that it is controlled by laser beam guidance method, which was an upgrade designated Bulsae-3. Its use was first reported in 2014 in the ranks of the Izz ad-Din al-Qassam Brigades and the Al-Nasser Salah al-Deen Brigades.

== Description ==
The missile is stored and carried in a container/launch tube. It is fired from a 9P135 launcher post, a simple tripod. A 9S451 guidance box is fitted to the tripod with the missile sitting just above. The 9Sh119 sight is fitted to the left side (from the gunner's point of view). The complete launcher system weighs 22.5 kg (50 lb). The gunner lies prone while firing. The system can engage moving targets travelling at less than 60 km/h (37 mph). The launcher post can traverse through 360 degrees horizontally, and ±20 degrees in elevation. The sight has a magnification of 10× and a 5 degree field of view. Up to three missiles a minute can be fired from a launcher post.

The system uses a gas generator to push the missile out of the launch tube, with the gas exiting the rear of the launch tube in a manner similar to a recoilless rifle. The missile leaves the launch tube at 80 m/s (180 mph; 290 km/h), and is then quickly accelerated to 186 m/s (420 mph; 670 km/h) by its solid fuel motor. This initial high speed reduces the missile's deadzone, since it can be launched directly at the target, rather than in an upward arc.

The launcher tracks the position of an incandescent infrared bulb on the back of the missile relative to the target and transmits appropriate commands to the missile via a thin wire that trails behind the missile. The SACLOS guidance system has many benefits over manual command to line of sight (MCLOS), with the accuracy of the system stated as 90% in some sources, though its performance is probably comparable to the TOW or the later SACLOS versions of the 9M14 Malyutka.

== Models ==
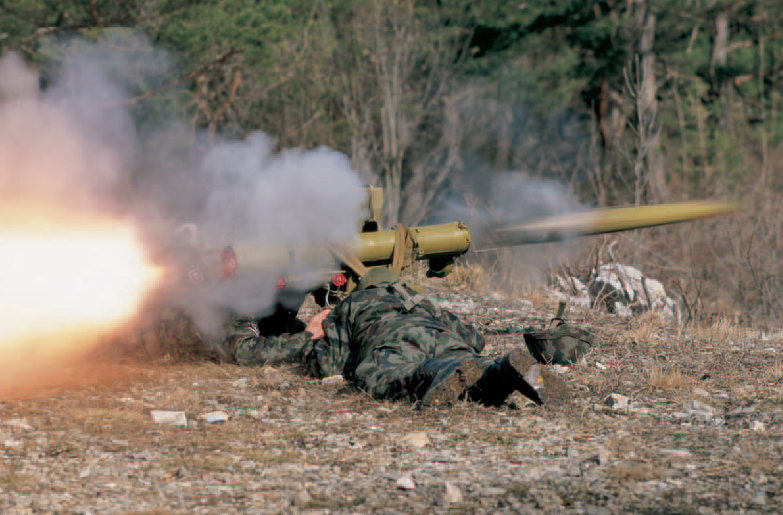
Slovenian army soldiers shooting a Fagot 9K111

=== Missile ===
- 9M111 Fagot (NATO: AT-4 Spigot and AT-4A Spigot A) Entered service in 1970. Maximum range 2,000 m (6,600 ft; 1.2 mi), minimum 70 m (230 ft). Warhead 400 mm versus RHA or 200 mm toward armour inclined at 60°.
- 9M111-2 Fagot (NATO: AT-4B Spigot B) Slightly improved version.
- 9M111M Faktoriya/Faktoria (Trading post) or Fagot-M (NATO: AT-4C Spigot C) Improved motor, longer guidance wire. Maximum range 2,500 m (8,200 ft; 1.6 mi), minimum 75 m (246 ft). Improved single HEAT warhead; penetration 600 mm versus RHA or 230 mm toward armour inclined at 60° (some publications claimed 9M111M to have tandem HEAT warhead).

	9M111/AT-4A	9M111-2/AT-4B	9M111M/AT-4C
Launch tube weight	13 kg (29 lb)	13 kg (29 lb)	13.4 kg (30 lb)
Range	75–2,000 m	75–2,500 m	75–2,500 m
Warhead	HEAT, 400 mm RHA penetration	HEAT, 460 mm RHA penetration	HEAT, 600 mm RHA penetration

=== Launcher ===
- 9P135 22.5 kg (50 lb). Can only fire the 9M111 Fagot series.
- 9P135M Can fire the 9M111 Fagot (NATO: AT-4 Spigot) series as well as the 9K113 Konkurs (NATO: AT-5 Spandrel) series missiles.
- 9P135M1 Updated version of the 9P135.
- 9P135M2 Updated version of the 9P135.
- 9P135M3 Deployed in the early 1990s. Adds 13 kg (29 lb) TPVP thermal imaging night sight – range 2,500 m (8,200 ft; 1.6 mi) at night.
- 9S451M2 A launcher with a night sight featuring an anti-dazzle system has been developed.

== Operators ==
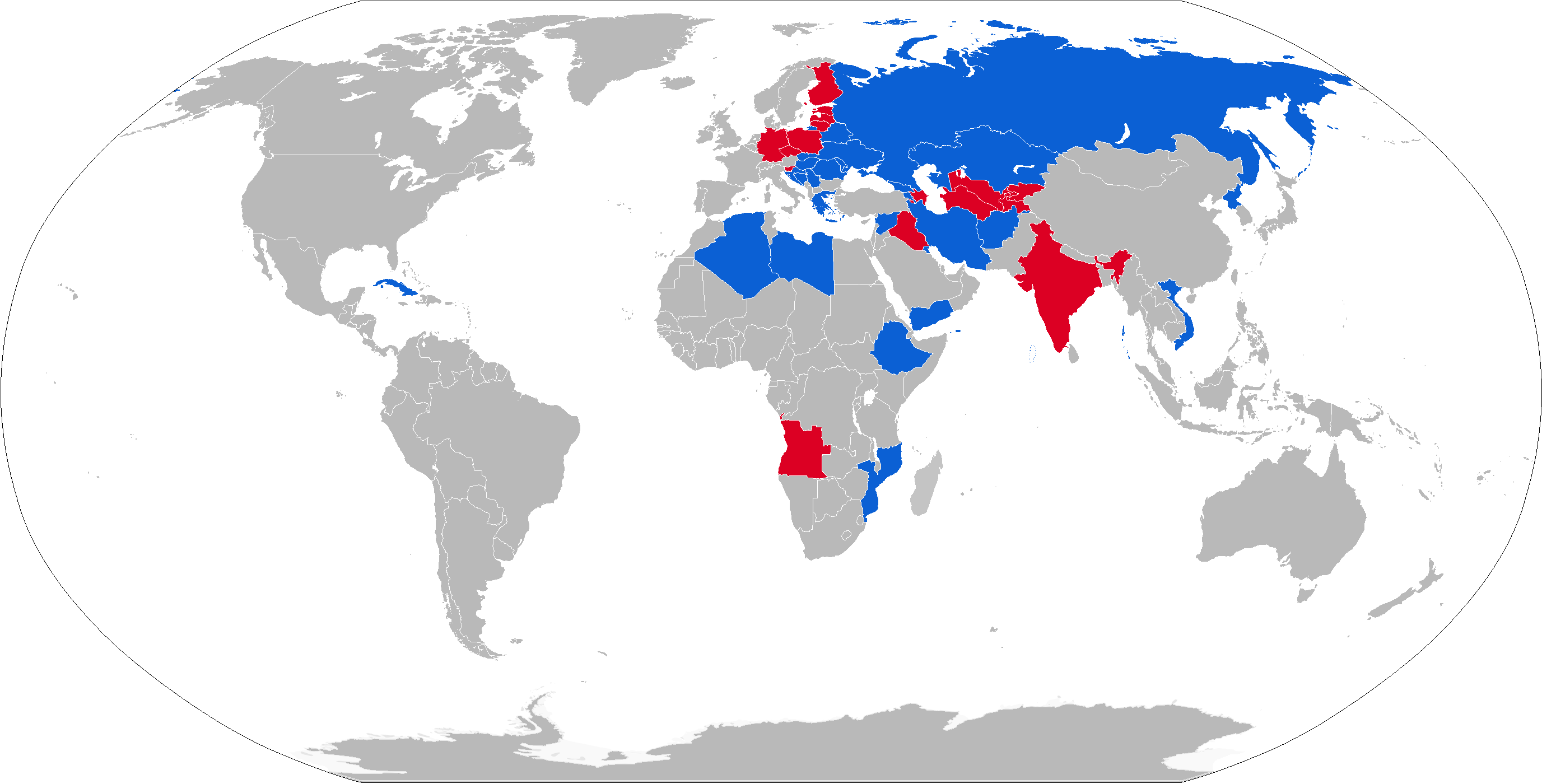
Operators Current Former

=== Current operators ===
- Algeria - 9K111 Fagot. 2040 delivered between 1995 and 1996 for BMP-2 IFV.
- Azerbaijan - 9K111 Fagot
- Bosnia and Herzegovina - 9K111 Fagot
- Belarus - 9K111 Fagot
- Bulgaria - 9K111 Fagot
- Croatia – 9K111 Fagot
- Cuba - 9K111 Fagot
- Ethiopia - 9K111 Fagot
- Georgia- 9K111 Fagot
- Greece – 9K111 Fagot (acquired from former East German stocks)
- Hungary - 9K111 Fagot
- Iran - 9K111 Fagot mounted on BMP-2 and Boragh.
- Kazakhstan - 9K111 Fagot, 200 in 2010
- Kuwait – Mounted on BMP-2.
- Kyrgyzstan - 9K111 Fagot
- Libya - 9K111 Fagot
- Moldova - 9K111 Fagot
- Montenegro - 9K111 Fagot
- Mozambique - 9K111 Fagot
- North Korea - 9K111 Fagot, reversed engineered under designation of Bulsae-2
- Romania - 9M111-2 Fagot
- Russia - 9K111M Faktoriya used by Army units and 9K111 Fagot used by Airborne units
- Serbia - 9K111 Fagot
- Slovakia - used on BMP-2.
- Syria - 9K111 Fagot
- Turkmenistan - 9K111 Fagot
- Ukraine - 9K111 Fagot used by Army and Airborne Assault Units.
- Uzbekistan - 9K111 Fagot
- Vietnam - Mounted on BMP-2.

=== Former operators ===
- Angola
- Chechen Republic of Ichkeria − 24 in 1992
- Czechoslovakia – transferred to both successors after the dissolution of Czechoslovakia
- Czech Republic
- East Germany – Passed on to Germany after German reunification
- Finland
- Germany – all retired soon after German reunification
- India
- Iraq – During Saddam's era
- Lithuania
- Poland – withdrawn and stored since early 2010s
- Slovenia – replaced by Spike missile
- Soviet Union – passed to successor states
- Yugoslavia - 1,000 missiles received between 1989 and 1991, passed to successor states.

=== Non-state actors ===
- Free Syrian Army and other rebel groups – large numbers
- Hamas – known to use Bulsae-2s
- Palestinian Islamic Jihad (aka Al-Quds Brigades)
- Hezbollah
- Islamic State – unknown number captured
- Kurdistan Workers' Party
- Liberation Tigers of Tamil Eelam
- Polisario front

== See also ==
- List of Russian weaponry

== Sources ==
- German, Tracey C. (2003). Russia's Chechen War. Routledge. ISBN 978-1-134-43250-9.
- Hull, A.W., Markov, D.R., Zaloga, S.J. (1998). Soviet/Russian Armor and Artillery Design Practices 1945 to Present. Darlington Productions. ISBN 1-892848-01-5.
