= 9M14 Malyutka =

9M14 Malyutka AT-3 Sagger
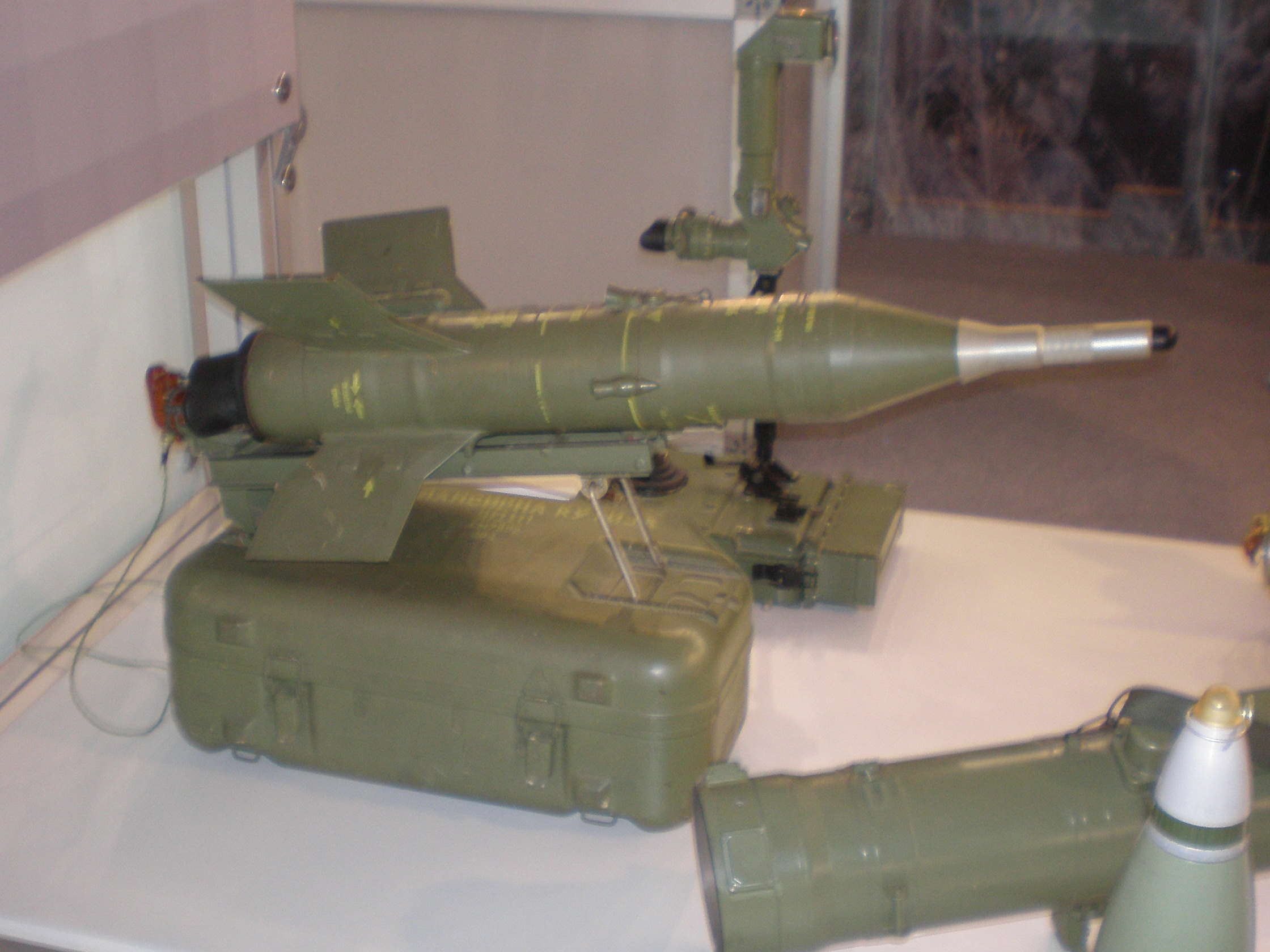
- Serbian-produced 9M142T copy
- Type: Anti-tank missile
- Place of origin: Soviet Union

Service history
- In service: 1963–present
- Used by: Soviet Union and others
- Wars: Vietnam War; Cambodian Civil War; Yom Kippur War; Western Sahara War; Ethiopian Civil War; Lebanese Civil War; Iran–Iraq War; Gulf War; Croatian War of Independence; Kosovo War; 2006 Lebanon War; First Chechen War; Second Chechen War; Libyan Civil War; Syrian Civil War; War in Iraq (2013-2017); Yemeni Civil War (2014–present); Saudi Arabian-led intervention in Yemen; Saudi–Yemeni border conflict (2015–present); Tigray War; Gaza war

Production history
- Designer: Design Bureau of Machine-Building (KBM, Kolomna)
- Designed: 1961–1962
- Manufacturer: Soviet Union, Russia as successor state and other countries under license and domestic versions
- Unit cost: $10,500 per missile (AT-3D, export cost 2019)
- Produced: 1963
- Variants: 9M14M, 9M14P1, Malyutka-2, Malyutka-2F

Specifications
- Mass: 10.9 kg (9M14M); 11.4 kg (9M14P1); 12.5 kg (Malyutka-2); ~12 kg (Malyutka-2F); 30.5 kg (Launcher and guidance)
- Length: 860 mm 1,005 mm combat ready (Malyutka-2)
- Width: 393 mm (wingspan)
- Diameter: 125 mm
- Effective firing range: 500–3,000 m
- Warhead weight: 2.6 kg (9M14M, 9M14P1); 3.5 kg (Malyutka-2, Malyutka-2F)
- Maximum speed: 115 m/s (410 km/h) (9M14M, 9M14P1); 130 m/s (470 km/h) (Malyutka-2, Malyutka-2F)
- Guidance system: MCLOS, SACLOS (Later variants)

The 9M14 Malyutka (Russian: Малютка, lit. 'Little one', NATO reporting name: AT-3 Sagger) is a manual command to line of sight (MCLOS) wire-guided anti-tank guided missile (ATGM) system developed in the Soviet Union. It was the first man-portable anti-tank guided missile of the Soviet Union and is probably the most widely produced ATGM of all time—with Soviet production peaking at 25,000 missiles a year during the 1960s and 1970s. In addition, copies of the missile have been manufactured under various names by at least six countries.

Although they have been supplanted by more advanced anti-tank guided missiles, the Malyutka and its variants have seen widespread use in nearly every regional conflict since the 1960s and are still kept in large stockpiles and sometimes used to this day by non state actors such as Hezbollah.

== Development ==
Development began in July 1961 with the government assigning the project to two design teams: Tula and Kolomna. The requirements were:

- Vehicle mountable and/or man portable
- Range of 3,000 meters
- Armor penetration of 200 millimetres at 60°
- Maximum weight of 10 kilograms

The designs were based on the Western ATGMs of the 1950s, such as the French ENTAC and the Swiss Cobra. In the end, the prototype developed by the Kolomna Machine Design Bureau, who were also responsible for the 3M6 Shmel, was chosen. Initial tests were completed by 20 December 1962, and the missile was accepted for service on 16 September 1963.

== Description ==
The missile can be fired from a portable suitcase launcher (9P111), ground vehicles (BMP-1, BRDM-2) and helicopters (Mi-2, Mi-8, Mi-24, Soko Gazelle). The missile takes about five minutes to deploy from its 9P111 fibreglass suitcase, which also serves as the launching platform.

The missile is guided to the target by means of a small joystick (9S415), which requires intensive training of the operator. The operator's adjustments are transmitted to the missile via a thin three-strand wire that trails behind the missile. The missile climbs into the air immediately after launch, which prevents it from hitting obstacles or the ground. In flight, the missile spins at 8.5 revolutions per second—it is initially spun by its booster, and the spin is maintained by the slight angle of the wings. The missile uses a small gyroscope to orient itself relative to the ground; as a result, the missile can take some time to bring back in line with the target, which gives it a minimum range of between 500 and 800 metres (550 and 870 yd). For targets under 1,000 m, the operator can guide the missile by eye; for targets beyond this range the operator uses the eight-power, 22.5-degree field of view, 9Sh16 periscope sight.

The engagement envelope is a 3 kilometres (1.9 mi) wide, 45-degree arc centered on the missile's launch axis. At ranges under 1.5 kilometres (0.93 mi), this arc reduces until, at the 500 metres (550 yd) range, the missile can only hit targets 50 metres (55 yd) either side of the center line. Accuracy falls off away from the launch axis—falling to approximately half its optimal accuracy at the extremes.

While early estimates of the missile hitting the target ranged from 60 to 90%, experience has shown that it can drop to an efficiency between 2 and 25% in case of less than optimal conditions and lack of skill from the operator. In fact, MCLOS requires considerable skill on the part of the operator, nevertheless, the weapon has always been quite popular with its operators and has enjoyed a constant updating effort both in the Soviet Union/Russia and in other countries.

The two most serious defects of the original weapon are its minimum range of between 500 and 800 metres (550 and 870 yd) (targets that are closer cannot be effectively engaged) and the amount of time it takes the slow moving missile to reach maximum range—around 30 seconds—giving the intended target time to take appropriate action, either by retreating behind an obstacle, laying down a smoke-screen, or by returning fire on the operator.

Later versions of the missile addressed these problems by implementing the much easier to use SACLOS guidance system (though only available for ground vehicle and helicopter mounts), as well as upgrading the propulsion system to increase the average flight speed. The latest updates feature tandem-charge warheads or standoff probes to counteract explosive reactive armor, as well as thermal imaging systems. Even in these latest versions, the Malyutka is probably the most inexpensive ATGM in service today.

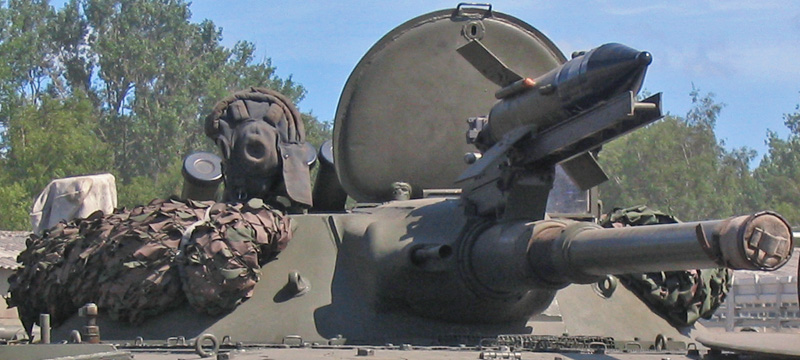
The turret of a BMP-1 with a 9M14M missile

== History ==
In Soviet service, the man-portable version was deployed as part of the anti-tank platoon of motor rifle battalions. Each platoon had two Malyutka sections, each with two teams. Each team had two launcher stations. One assistant gunner in each team served as an RPG-7 gunner. The RPG-7 was needed to cover the 500 meter deadzone created by the minimum range of the missile.

It is also an integrated part of the BMP-1, BMD-1, and BRDM-2 vehicles.

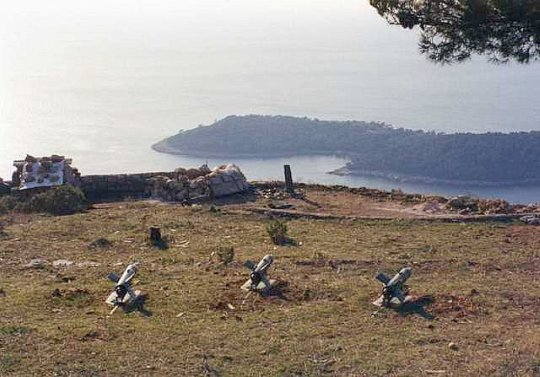
Yugoslav People's Army Malyutkas overlooking Dubrovnik during its siege, December 1991

=== Vietnam War ===
On 23 April 1972, the recently organized Army of the Republic of Vietnam (ARVN) 20th Tank Regiment was attacked by the People's Army of Vietnam (PAVN) employing the Malyutka for the first time. The 20th was the only South Vietnamese armor unit equipped with the M48 Patton tank. This first employment of the Malyutka destroyed one M48A3 and one M113 armored cavalry assault vehicle (ACAV), and a second ACAV was damaged.

During this engagement with the weapon, the ARVN tankers appeared fascinated by the missile's slow and erratic flight, but through experience, they soon deployed countermeasures against the weapon system. Upon launching by the enemy, ARVN crewmen would fire all their weapons towards the missile's firing position, which would make the gunner flinch and lose control of his missile. Although the gunner could take cover away from the launch site, the joystick control wire only allowed 15 meters of clearance. During the engagement, the ARVN eventually lost eight tanks to the 9M14M missile, but had developed tactics to defend themselves against it.

During the Battle of Kontum (1972), 33 missiles were fired and 32 hit, destroying four tanks, two howitzers, six bunkers and seven other targets.

During the Battle of Cửa Việt (1973), the PAVN put up fierce resistance to the attack, destroying 26 M48s and M113s with 9M14 missiles.

Vietnam claims that throughout the war, PAVN gunner Dao Van Tien fired 134 missiles and 130 hit, destroying 23 tanks and APCs, 12 howitzers, 27 bunkers and 17 other targets.

=== Yom Kippur War ===
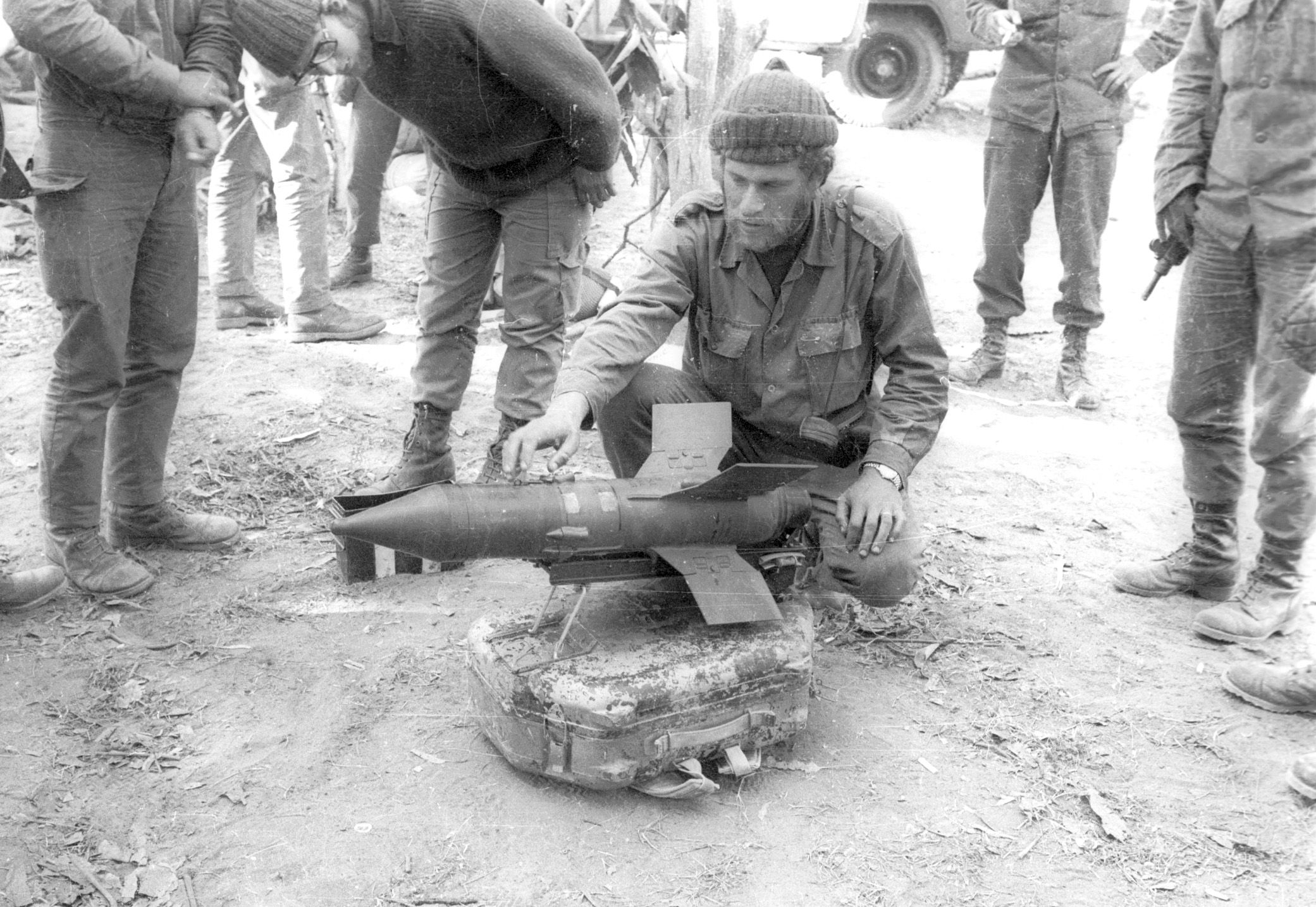
IDF soldiers inspect a captured 9M14 missile and launch unit.

The missile was employed by Arab armies during the initial phases of the Yom Kippur War. Later in the war, the Israelis adopted new tactics and learned to neutralize the threat by employing large concentrations of artillery fire to either distract or kill the missile operators. Other improvised methods used by the Israelis to defeat the Malyutkas involved firing in front of the tank to create dust, moving back and forth and firing at the source of the missile. These Israeli tactics were later adopted by NATO forces to counter the threat posed by Warsaw Pact ATGMs. In total, Malyutkas knocked out more than 800 Israeli tanks and other combat vehicles during the war.

=== Libyan Civil War ===
Rebels of the Free Libyan Army have been filmed using Malyutkas during the Libyan Civil War.

=== Syrian Civil War ===
Syrian rebels have also uploaded videos of themselves firing Malyutkas against government forces since late 2012.

=== 2023 Hamas-led attack on Israel ===
On 7 October 2023, a Palestinian faction, Al-Quds Brigades uploaded a video of them on Telegram supposedly operating a Malyutka inside a building located adjacent with the Israeli border against an Israeli vehicle near Nahal Oz. However, the article cited has mistaken the Malyutka used as an Iranian RAAD. Similar rockets were fired in large numbers by Hezbollah on Israeli targets along the northern Israeli border during the war.

== Models ==
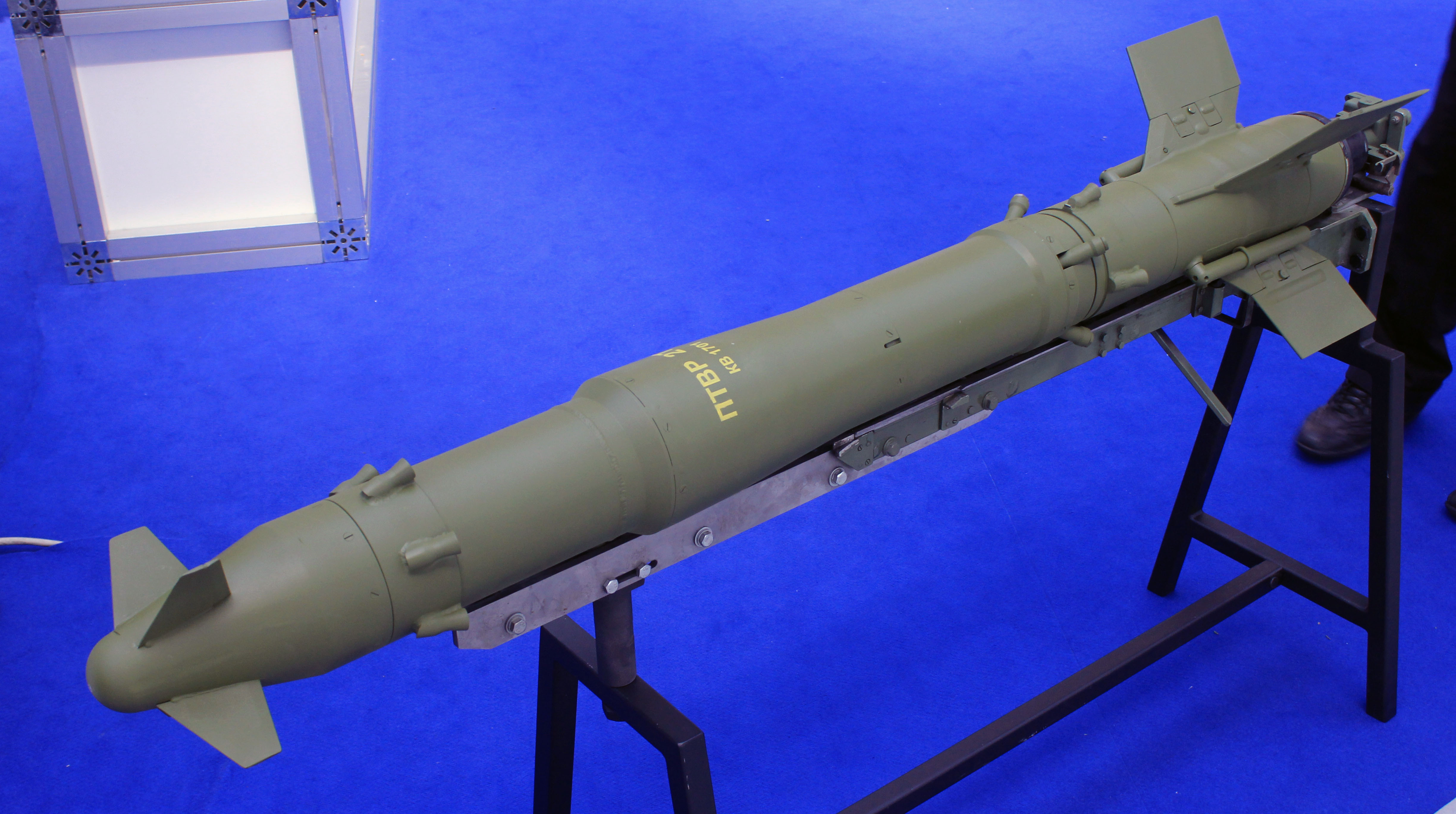
A Serbian Malyutka 2T5

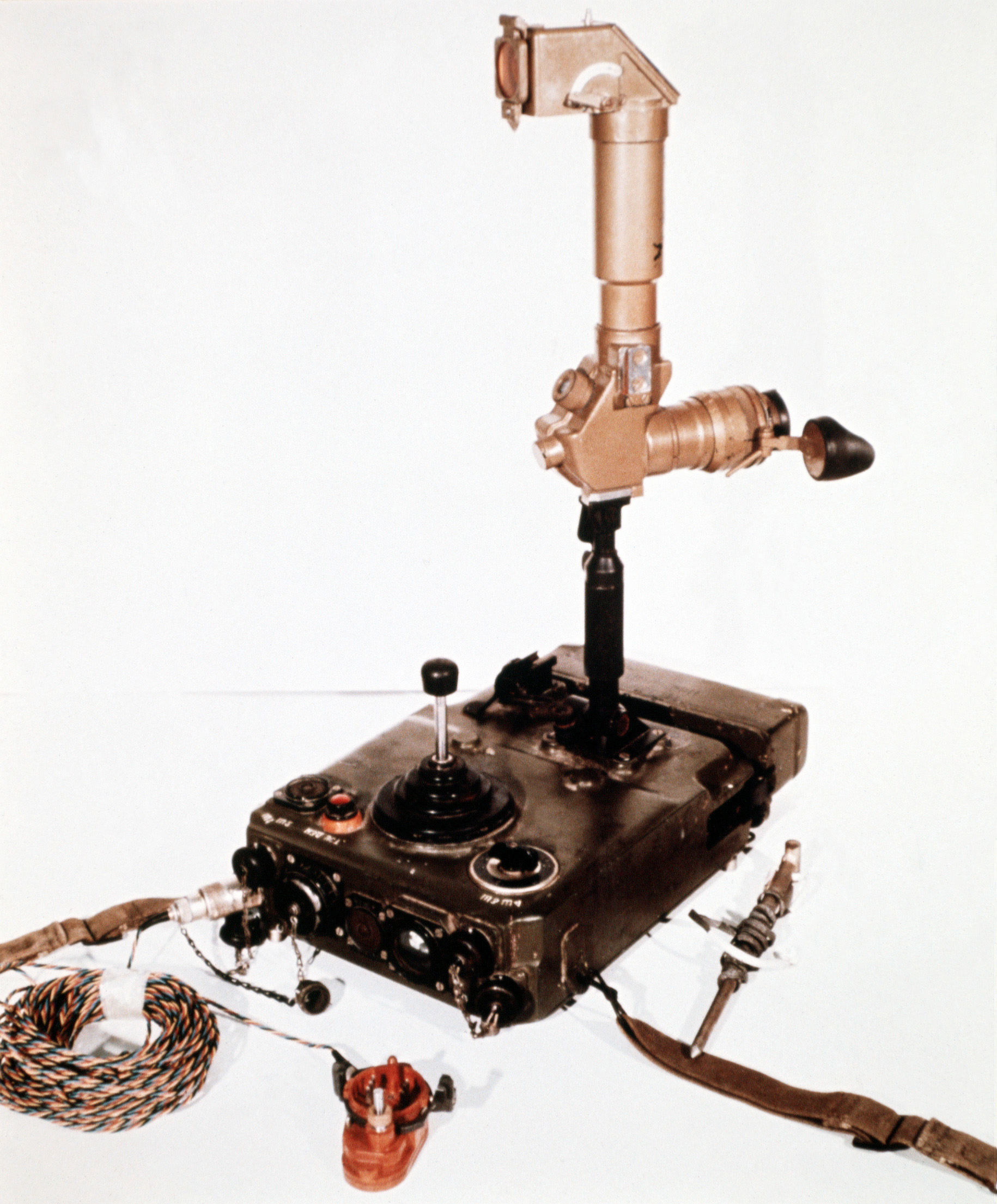
A 9S415 control box for the Malyutka missile.

- 9M14 Malyutka
  - 9M14 Malyutka (NATO reporting name AT-3 Sagger) wire-guided MCLOS, entered service in 1963.
  - 9M14P Malyutka-P (NATO reporting name AT-3C Sagger C) wire-guided SACLOS, entered service in 1969. Improved warhead (460 mm versus RHA)
    - 9M14P1 Improved warhead (520 mm versus RHA), and a stand off probe for improved capability against ERA.
    - 9M14MP1
    - 9M14MP2
  - 9M14M Malyutka-M (NATO reporting name AT-3B Sagger B) wire-guided MCLOS, entered service in 1973. Improved motor, reducing flight time to maximum range. Mass 11 kg. Range 3 km.
  - 9M14-2 Malyutka-2 (NATO reporting name AT-3D Sagger D) wire-guided SACLOS, entered service in 1992. Speed improved to 130 m/s. 3.5 kg HEAT warhead (800 mm penetration versus RHA). Weight 12.5 kg. Range 3 km.
    - 9M14-2M Malyutka-2M 4.2 kg tandem HEAT warhead for improved capability against ERA. Weight 13.5 kg. Speed 120 m/s.
    - 9M14-2P Malyutka-2P
    - 9M14-2F Malyutka-2F 3.0 kg thermobaric warhead. Intended for use against troops and soft vehicles.
    - 9M14P-2F
    - 9M14-2T Serbian VTI Malyutka-2T SACLOS. 4.4 kg tandem HEAT warhead (1,000 mm penetration versus RHA), improved capability against ERA. Weight 13.7 kg. Speed 120 m/s.
    - 2T5 Serbian VTI Malyutka-2T5 range 5 kilometers, guided missile via radio control. Speed 200 m/s.
- HJ-73 Hongjian Red Arrow-73 China
  - HJ-73 MCLOS entered service in 1979
  - HJ-73A SACLOS new guidance system as well as stronger primary warhead.
  - HJ-73B SACLOS stand off probe for improved capability against ERA
  - HJ-73C SACLOS tandem HEAT warhead to penetrate vehicles protected by ERA. Launcher equipped with thermals.
- RAAD Iran
  - RAAD 9M14M clone
  - RAAD-T tandem HEAT warhead
  - I-RAAD SACLOS
  - I-RAAD-T SACLOS tandem HEAT warhead
- Susong-Po North Korean
- Maliutka M2T Romania, joint ELMEC and Euromissile project, uses MILAN 2T tandem warhead capable of defeating ~900mm of RHA.
- Kun Wu 1 In the 1970s, the Taiwanese National Chung-Shan Institute of Science and Technology replicated and produced the 9M14 Malyutka as the Kun Wu. The ROC had obtained the 9M14 Malyutkas from South Vietnam. Due to the dated design and low priority placed on anti-tank weapons by the armed forces it was not widely adopted.
- CTVN-18 The Vietnamese version employs a tandem warhead capable of penetrating ~800mm of rolled homogeneous armor (RHA).

=== Production ===
The Malyutka and modern derivatives are still produced in several versions in following countries:

- North Korea – domestic version Bulsae-1
- Iran – domestic modernized version RAAD
- Serbia – few domestic modernized versions with different types of warheads, range and guidance
- Vietnam – CTVN-18
- China – HJ-73 variants
- Romania – Malyutka M2T
- Egypt – licensed modernized version AHRAM with new warheads and a thermal sight

== Operators ==
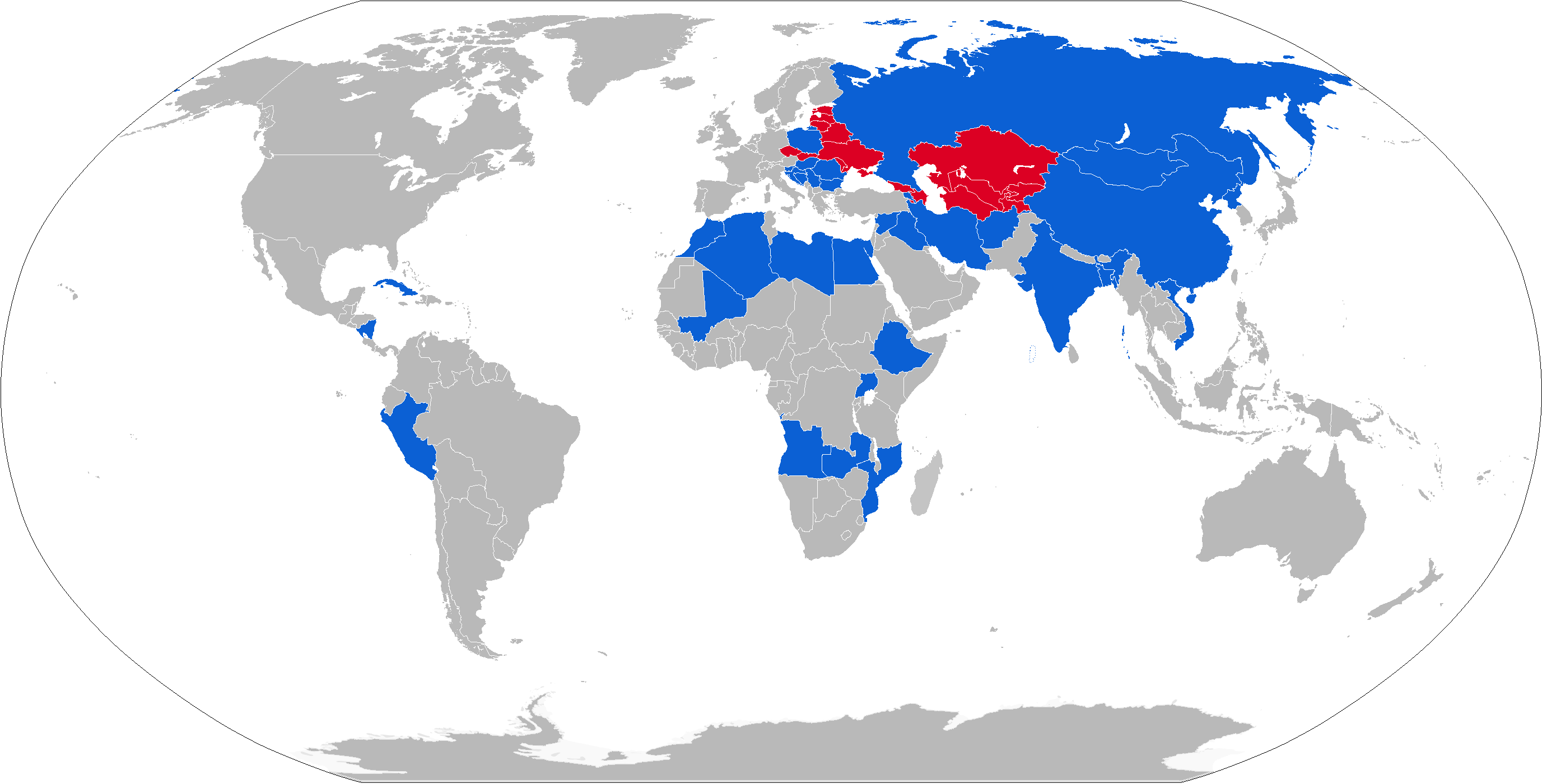
Operators Current Former

=== Current ===
- Afghanistan − Used by the Taliban
- Algeria
- Angola
- Azerbaijan
- Bosnia and Herzegovina
- China
- Cuba
- Egypt
- Eritrea
- Ethiopia
- Guinea
- Iran
- Indonesia
- Kyrgyzstan
- Morocco
- Mozambique
- Nicaragua
- North Korea
- Peru − Includes Chinese HJ-73C
- Poland
- Romania
- Sahrawi Republic
- Serbia
- Slovakia
- South Sudan – Chinese HJ-73
- Sudan
- Syria
- Turkmenistan
- Uzbekistan
- Vietnam
- Yemen
- Zambia

=== Non-state ===
- Al-Shabaab
- Boko Haram
- Hamas − Reportedly smuggled from the Sinai peninsula
- Hezbollah
- Islamic State of Iraq and the Levant
- Islamic State – Sinai Province
- KDP Peshmerga
- (Libya) Libyan National Army
- Palestine Liberation Organization
- Palestinian Islamic Jihad (aka Al-Quds Brigades)
- Popular Mobilization Units
- Syrian Democratic Forces
- Syrian rebels
- Tahrir al-Sham
- YPG

=== Former ===
- Albania − Chinese HJ-73
- Armenia
- Bangladesh − Chinese HJ-73
- Bulgaria − In storage
- Cambodia − Chinese HJ-73
- Congo
- Croatia
- Czechoslovakia
- Czech Republic
- East Germany
- Finland
- Georgia
- Guinea-Bissau
- Hungary
- India
- Iraq
- (Iraq) Iraqi insurgents
- Israel
- Kosovo Liberation Army
- Latvia
- Libya
- Mali
- Mongolia
- (Mali) National Committee for the Restoration of Democracy and State (CNRDR)
- National Liberation Army (Macedonia)
- North Macedonia
- North Vietnam
- Palestinian Authority
- Russia
- Slovenia
- Somalia
- South Yemen
- Soviet Union
- Taiwan − Kun Wu
- Uganda
- Union of Forces for Democracy and Development
- Yugoslavia

== See also ==
- List of Russian weaponry
- List of NATO reporting names for anti-tank missiles
