= 282nd Brigade =

282nd Brigade may refer to:

- 282nd Armored Brigade, Romania
- 282nd Brigade, Royal Field Artillery, United Kingdom
