= BMP-1 =

Soviet infantry fighting vehicle

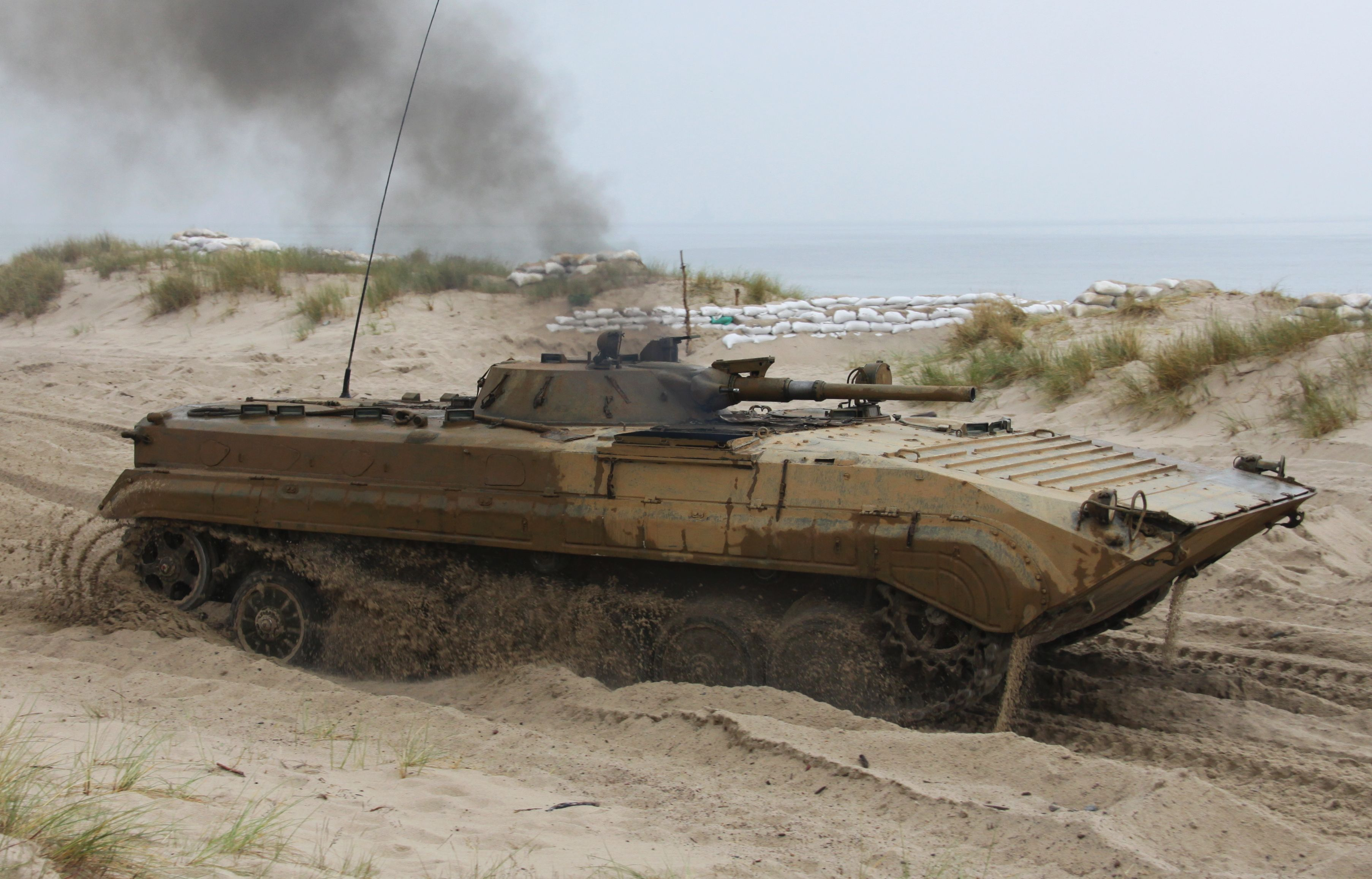
- A Polish BMP-1 (BWP-1) during a training exercise in 2016
- Type: Infantry fighting vehicle; Armoured personnel carrier
- Place of origin: Soviet Union

Service history
- In service: 1966–present
- Used by: See Service history
- Wars: See Service history

Production history
- Designer: Pavel Isakov (Design Bureau of the ChTZ)
- Designed: 1961–1965
- Manufacturer: Kurganmashzavod (Soviet Union); ZTS Detva (Czechoslovakia); See also Production history section for details.
- Produced: 1966–(production in the Soviet Union ended in 1982 or 1983) 2026–(production to restart in Slovakia between 2026 and 2027)
- No. built: More than 20,000 of all variants (Soviet Union); More than 3,000 of all variants (PRC); 18,000 (Czechoslovakia); ≈800 (India)
- Variants: BMP-1, BMP-2, MLI-84, Boragh; see also BMP-1 variants.

Specifications (Ob'yekt 765Sp3)
- Mass: 13.2 tonnes (13.0 long tons; 14.6 short tons)
- Length: 6.735 m (22 ft 1.2 in)
- Width: 2.94 m (9 ft 8 in)
- Height: 2.068 m (6 ft 9.4 in); 1.881 m (6 ft 2.1 in) to turret top
- Crew: 3 (commander, driver and gunner) + 8 passengers
- Armor: 6–33 mm (0.24–1.30 in) welded rolled steel
- Main armament: 73 mm 2A28 Grom smoothbore gun (40 rounds); 9M14 Malyutka ATGM(4 rounds)
- Secondary armament: 7.62 mm PKT coaxial machine gun (2,000 rounds)
- Engine: UTD-20 V6 diesel engine 300 hp (220 kW) at 2,600 rpm
- Power/weight: 22.7 hp/tonne (17.0 kW/tonne)
- Suspension: torsion bar
- Ground clearance: 370 mm (15 in)
- Fuel capacity: 462 L (102 imp gal; 122 US gal)
- Operational range: 600 km (370 mi) road; 500 km (310 mi) off-road
- Maximum speed: 65 km/h (40 mph) road 45 km/h (28 mph) off-road; 7–8 km/h (4.3–5.0 mph) water

The BMP-1 is a Soviet amphibious tracked infantry fighting vehicle that has been in service from 1966 to the present. BMP stands for Boyevaya Mashina Pyekhoty 1 (Russian: Боевая Машина Пехоты 1; БМП-1), meaning "infantry fighting vehicle, 1st serial model". The BMP-1 was the Soviet Union's, and the world's, first mass-produced infantry fighting vehicle (IFV). The development of the BMP was a major break in tradition for the Red Army, which did not field armored and mechanized infantry transporters, like the US M3 half-track, the British Universal Carrier, and the German SdKfz 251, during World War II. The Red Army instead moved to motorized rifle divisions equipped with the BTR-60 family of armored personnel carriers. By the late 1950s, the Red Army leadership faced a US Army armed with tactical nuclear weapons, which necessitated the adoption of fully armored and NBC (nuclear, biological, chemical) protected infantry vehicles. From that premise came the BMP with the mobility and firepower of a light tank that allowed the on-board infantry squad to fight under protection. The new vehicle would give each infantry squad the mobility to support main battle tanks. The first production batch produced in 1966, but the elimination of teething problems went until 1970, with the release of the definitive BMP-1 model. The BMP-1 was widely exported to Warsaw Pact nations, and Soviet client states. The BMP-1 was first tested in combat in the 1973 Yom Kippur War, where it was used by Egyptian and Syrian forces. Designers incorporated lessons learned from the Yom Kippur War and the Soviet–Afghan War into an upgraded BMP-1P, which was adopted in the late 1970s. The vehicle remained in production briefly until superseded by the improved BMP-2 in 1977. Similar to its stablemates, the T-55 and T-62 tanks, the BMP-1 was modified by the Red Army as a command, reconnaissance, mineclearing, and maintenance vehicle. The Russian Army later developed a package for upgrading the firepower, powerpack and running gear of export BMP-1s, while many were upgraded by their foreign owners with various modifications. By 2002, the Russian Federation held over 3,000 in reserve, while 37 other countries maintained fleets of BMP-1s, the largest being: Syria (2,250), Ukraine (1,563), Poland (1,367) and Libya (1,000).

== Development ==
The Red Army's mechanized infantry tactics during the 1950s were similar to World War II methods, in which APCs were used as "battle taxis". They would keep the infantry in close proximity to the battle tanks during movement, but on enemy contact they would unload their infantry before retreating to safer areas. This was in contrast to the German doctrine of infantry fighting vehicles manifested in the Schützenpanzer Lang HS.30, where the vehicles were supposed to stay with the tanks and engage lighter targets, both to take a burden off the tanks and to support their infantry squads.

Existing APCs offered little or no protection from either nuclear or chemical weapons, as they were either open-topped or could not be sealed sufficiently. Furthermore, the infantry had to disembark to be able to use their weapons.

The requirement for the BMP, which was first drawn up in the late 1950s, stressed speed, good armament, and the ability for all squad members to shoot from within the vehicle. The armament had to provide direct support for dismounted infantry in the attack and defense, and to be able to destroy comparable light armored vehicles. The vehicle needed to protect the crew from .50 cal machinegun fire and 20–23 mm caliber autocannons across the frontal arc, as well as from light shell fragments at distances between 500 m and 800 m.

Firepower consisted of the innovative combination of the 73 mm 2A28 Grom gun and a launcher for the 9M14 Malyutka (AT-3A Sagger A) anti-tank wire-guided missile (ATGM). The gun was intended to engage enemy armored vehicles and firing points at a range of up to 700 metres (770 yd). The missile launcher was intended to be used against targets that were 500 to 3,000 metres (550 to 3,280 yd) away.

Requirements were issued to the various design bureaus between 1959 and 1960. There was a question as to whether the BMP should be tracked or wheeled, so a number of experimental configurations were explored, including hybrid wheeled/tracked designs.

The tracked Ob'yekt 764 (codename Object 764) was chosen because its front-engine design provided a convenient and fast way of mounting and dismounting through two rear doors. The original prototype was built in 1964, followed by the improved Ob'yekt 765 in 1965, which was accepted by the Army in 1966, under a designation BMP-1. The 120th Guards Motor Rifle Division was the first formation in the Soviet Union to test prototypes of the new BMP ("objekt 765") infantry fighting vehicle in January–November 1965, under the command of Guards Major Vasiliy Samodelov. Small-scale production began in 1966.

=== Table of models ===
Characteristics of the main models of the BMP series
	BMP (ob'yekt 765Sp1)	BMP-1 (объект 765Sp2)	BMP-1 (объект 765Sp3)	BMP-1P (объект 765Sp4/5)	BMP-1D	BMP-2	BMP-3
Weight (tonnes)	12.6	13.0	13.2	13.4	14.5	14.0	18.7
Crew	3+8					3+7	
Main gun	73 mm 2A28 "Grom" low pressure smoothbore semi-automatic gun					30 mm 2A42 autocannon	100 mm 2A70 rifled automatic gun/missile-launcher 30 mm 2A72 autocannon
Machine gun(s)	7.62 mm PKT coaxial						3 × 7.62 mm PKT (1 coaxial, 2 bow mounted)
ATGM (NATO designation)	9M14 "Malyutka" (AT-3 Sagger) and variants			9M113 "Konkurs" (AT-5 Spandrel) or 9M111 "Fagot" (AT-4 Spigot) and variants	9M14 "Malyutka" or 9M113 "Konkurs" or removed (on most vehicles)	9M113 "Konkurs" (AT-5 Spandrel) or 9M111 "Fagot" (AT-4 Spigot) and variants	9M117 "Bastion" (AT-10 Stabber)
Engine	UTD-20 6-cylinder 4-stroke V-shaped airless-injection water-cooled diesel developing 300 hp (220 kW) at 2,600 rpm					UTD-20S1 diesel developing 300 hp (220 kW) at 2,600 rpm	UTD-29M 10-cylinder diesel developing 500 hp (370 kW) at 2,600 rpm
Power-to-weight ratio hp/tonne (kW/tonne)	23.8 (17.8)	23.1 (17.2)	22.7 (17.0)	22.4 (16.7)	20.7 (15.5)	21.4 (16.0)	26.7 (20.0)

== Production history ==
The BMP went into limited production with the Soviet Army in 1966. The first series (Ob'yekt 765 Sp1, "specification 1") was produced until 1969. It was replaced by the improved production model, the BMP-1 (the Ob'yekt 765 Sp2), which was produced from 1969 until 1973. This, in turn, was replaced by the Ob'yekt 765 Sp3, which was a modernized, 200 kg heavier version that was produced from 1973 to 1979. A number of improvements were made to the reliability of the chassis, engine and transmission during mass production.

The latest version of the BMP-1 IFV (BMP-1P, Ob'yekt 765 Sp4), which was produced from 1979 to 1983, was armed with a more powerful ATGM launcher 9P135M-1 for the ATGM "Konkurs"/"Fagot". The main manufacturer of the BMP-1 and its different variants was the Kurgan Machine Building Works (Kurganskiy Mashinostroitelyniy Zavod) in Russia. The PRP-3 artillery reconnaissance vehicles were produced by the Chelyabinsk Tractor Works (ChTZ). The PRP-4/PRP-4M artillery reconnaissance vehicles were produced by the Rubtsovsk Engineering Works (RMZ). Upgrades of the BMP-1 were performed by KMZ as well as by tank repair workshops of the Ministry of Defence during scheduled and major overhauls. More than 20,000 BMP-1s and vehicles based on it were built in the USSR.

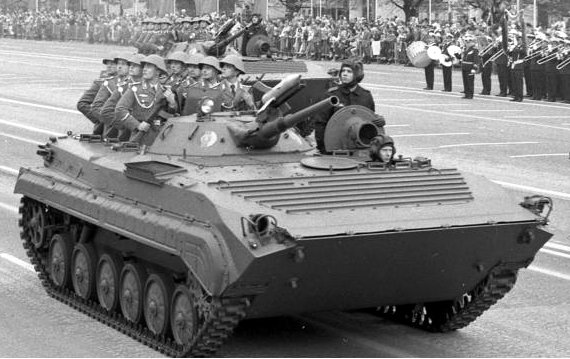
An East German BMP-1 with eight passengers

BMP-1s were produced under license by Czechoslovakia (BVP-1), Romania (MLI-84) and India. Since 1986, the People's Republic of China has produced its own unlicensed copy called the Type 86 (WZ 501). The number of Type 86 IFVs and vehicles based upon it is around 3,000. It is still in service with the People's Liberation Army. From 1997, Iran produced its own modification of the BMP-1, the Boragh, which resembles the Chinese WZ 503.

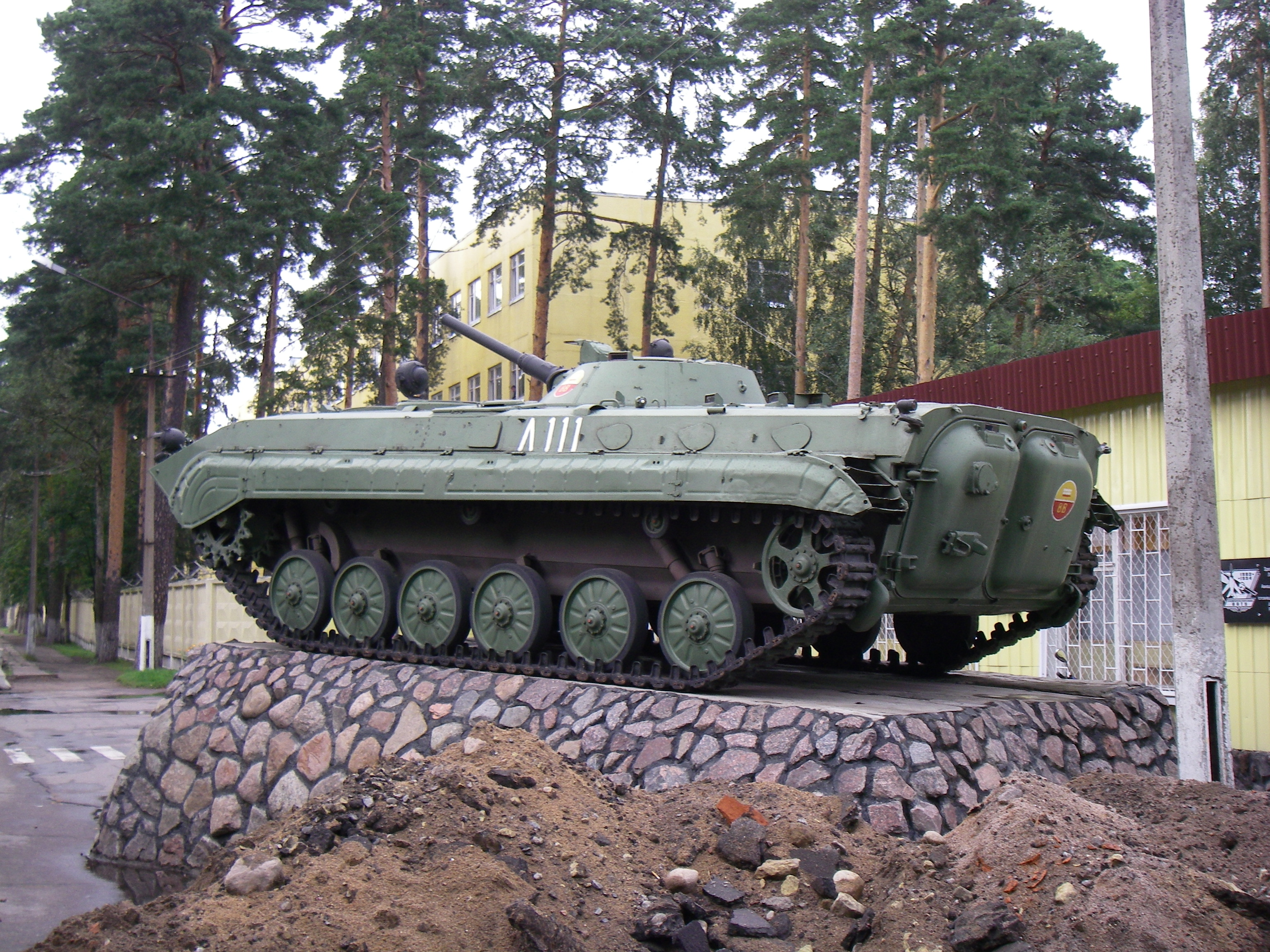
A rear view of a plinthed BMP-1 in Lebyazhye, Lomonosovsky District, Leningrad Oblast

=== Variants and modernization ===
In the mid-1970s, after analysis of the use of light AFVs during the Yom Kippur, Angolan and Vietnam wars, a modernization program was begun that resulted in the BMP-1P (Ob'yekt 765 Sp4). The main changes were the replacement of the largely ineffective 9M14M Malyutka ATGM with the more reliable, longer range and more powerful 9P135M or 9P135M-1 ATGM launcher. It was located on a special pintle mount on top of the turret roof, that could fire the SACLOS guided 9M113 and 9M113M Konkurs-M ATGMs, which increased armor penetration to 670 mm (26 in) and had an extended range of 4,000 m (4,400 yd).

The 9P135M-1 launcher was capable of firing 9M111 and 9M111-2 Fagot ATGMs. The Malyutka loading hatch was usually welded shut and the mounting bracket was removed. The new missiles were somewhat difficult to use since the gunner had to stand in his open hatch, exposing himself to hostile fire. It is possible to detach the 9P135M(1) ATGM launcher from the turret and use it from the ground.

The BMP-1P was equipped with neutron weapon protection covering and a new fire-extinguishing system for protection against napalm. Later BMP-1Ps were fitted with an array of six 902V "Tucha" 81 millimetres (3.2 in) calibre smoke grenade launchers at the rear of the turret. Some were equipped with the track-width KMT-10 mine plow. The BMP-1P replaced the BMP-1 in production in 1979. Many BMP-1s were upgraded to the new standard during the 1980s.

The BMP-1PG model added a 30 mm (1.2 in) AGS-17 "Plamya" automatic grenade launcher on top of the turret on the left side, for which it carries 290 grenades. Some BMP-1s had the AGS-17 added during major repairs (Ob'yekt 765Sp8).

A non-amphibious BMP-1D (the so-called 'Afghan' variant), was built in 1982 for assault units in Afghanistan. It had 5 mm thick appliqué steel armor plates on the hull sides with holes for side firing ports as well as armor plate under the commander's and driver's seats for added protection against mines. It had large steel armored skirts fitted to the sides of the hull covering the suspension. Firing ports were added into the top hatches of the troop compartment and a stowage box was placed on the roof at the rear of the hull on some vehicles. The 9S428 ATGM launcher was often removed and replaced by an AGS-17 automatic grenade launcher.

An Soviet infantry fighting vehicle BMP-1 abandoned in the field of Bamyan, Afghanistan 2025

Due to experience in Afghanistan, a new version with enhanced fighting capabilities, the BMP-2, was introduced in 1980. It had a new two-man turret armed with a 30 mm 2A42 multi-purpose autocannon and a 9P135M-1 ATGM launcher capable of firing SACLOS guided 9M113 Konkurs and 9M113M Konkurs-M as well as 9M111 and 9M111-2 Fagot ATGMs.

Later modernization plans included mounting the turret of the BMD-2 IFV on to BMP-1s, but the vehicle never left the design phase. Recent proposals for the modernization of BMP-1s include mounting new turrets armed with a 2A72 30 mm (1.2 in) autocannon, approved in 2018, or a TKB-799 Kliver one-man weapons station with a computerized fire control system, armed with a missile pod (which can be armed with either four 9M133 Kornet (AT-14 Spriggan) or 9M133F Kornet ATGMs or 9K38 Igla (SA-18 Grouse) SAMs), a 30 mm 2A72 dual-purpose autocannon and a 7.62 mm (0.300 in) PKTM coaxial machine gun (BMP-1AM 'Basurmanin' and BMP-1M respectively).

The BMP-1AM Basurmanin is an upgraded version of BMP-1 developed by The Uralvagonzavod (UVZ) research-and-manufacturing corporation (a subsidiary of the Rostec state corporation). The BMP-1AM is BMP-1 with the original turret replaced by the turret from BTR-82A with a 2A72 30 mm autocannon, a Kalashnikov PKTM 7.62 mm medium machinegun, and 902V Tucha smoke grenade launchers. The turret will be fitted with the TKN-4GA combined day-night sighting system. The 2A72 cannon will be able to use air burst munitions. Approved in 2018, it is the most recent Russian BMP-1 upgrade. The Russian army plans to upgrade all of their BMP-1s and BMP-1Ps to BMP-1AM level.

See BMP-1 variants article for a complete list of BMP-1 modifications and variants based upon it.

== Description ==
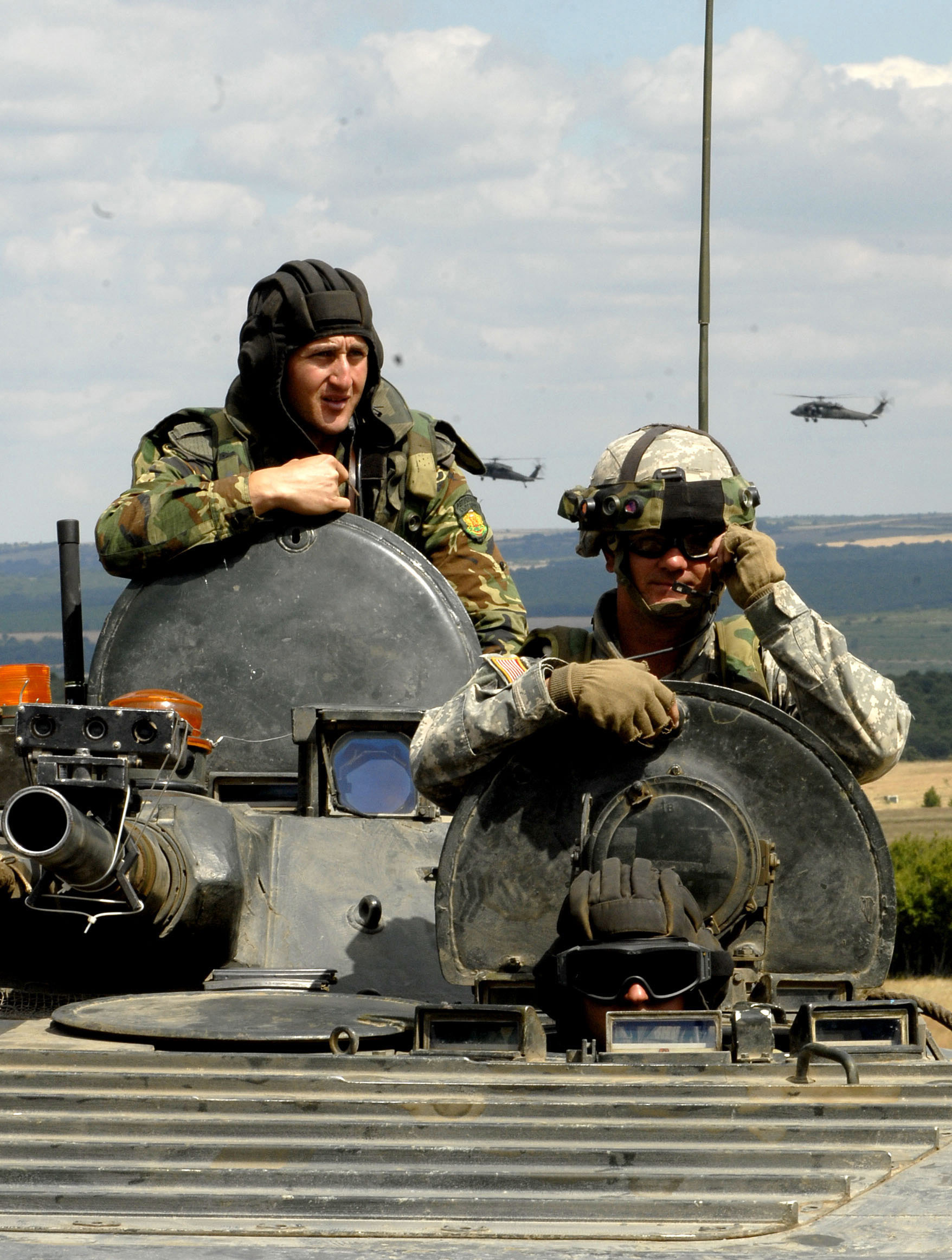
Two Bulgarian Army soldiers man the driver's and gunner's stations, while a US Army soldier occupies the commander's position of a Bulgarian BMP-1 IFV.

The BMP-1 is a fully amphibious tracked vehicle, with a front-engined chassis developed especially for it, a welded steel hull with a sharp, sloping front with a conspicuously ridged surface, a centrally located, flat, truncated cone turret and a troop compartment at the rear.

=== Driver's station ===
The driver sits in the front on the left side of the hull, with a single piece hatch that opens to his right. Three forward facing TNPO-170 periscope vision-blocks are mounted to allow the driver to see when driving with the hatch closed. The driver's center vision block can be replaced with a TVNO-2 active night binocular vision device for use in night and poor visibility conditions or with a TNPO-350B extended periscope when swimming with the trim vane erected. The BMP was the first Soviet armored vehicle to use a simple yoke steering system.

=== Commander's station ===
The vehicle (and infantry squad) commander's station is located behind the driver's station. The commander's station has a fully traversable cupola with three day periscope blocks. Also mounted on the cupola is a removable OU-3GA2 or OU-3GK infrared searchlight with an effective range of about 400 metres (440 yd). A dual mode (day/night) TKN-3B 5x/4.2x magnification binocular vision device is coupled to the infrared searchlight. The commander's station is equipped with an R-123M radio set.

=== Turret ===
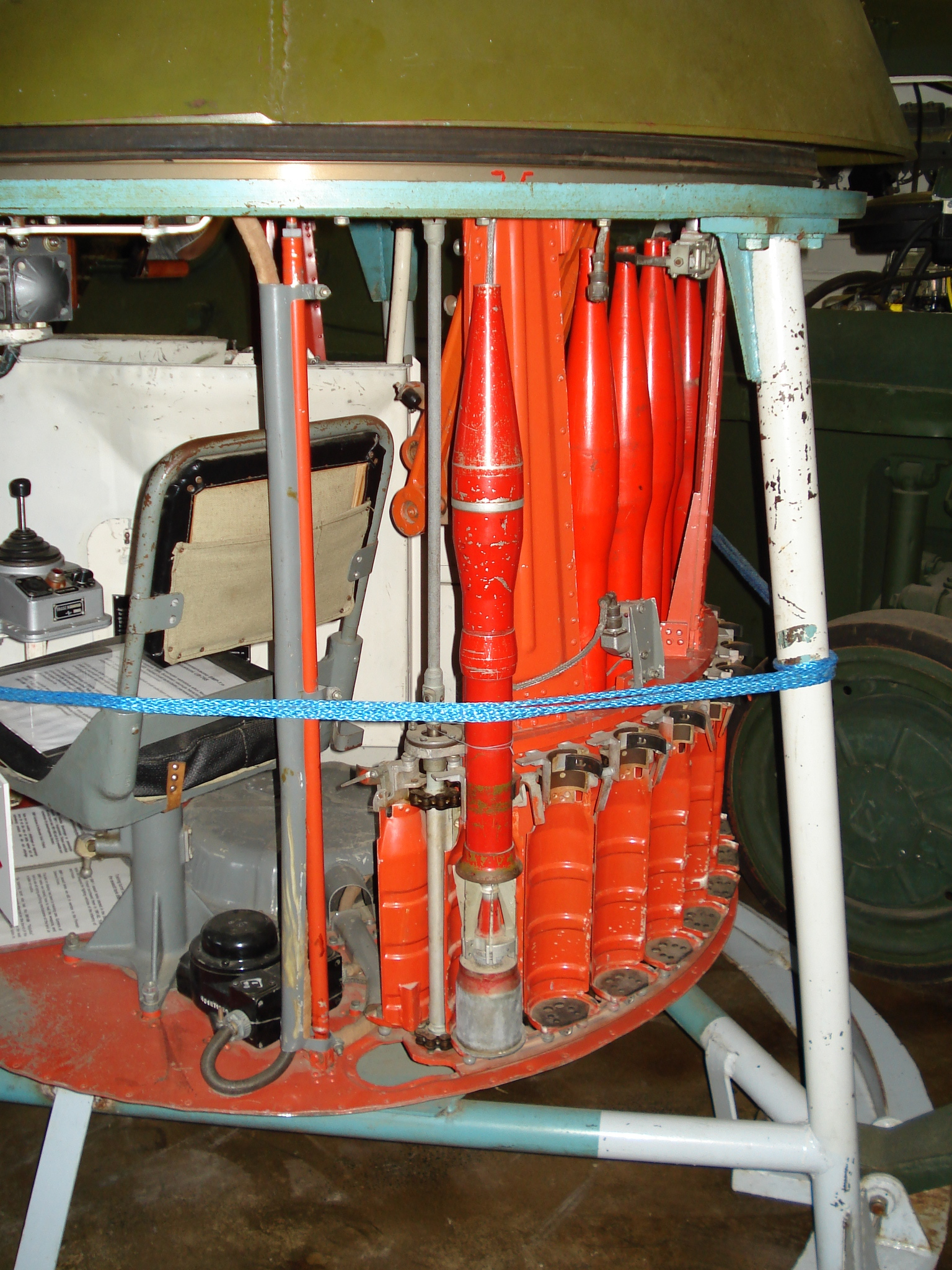
The gunner's station of a BMP-1 training turret at Parola Tank Museum, Finland. Note the ammunition stowage.

The BMP-1 has a one man conical turret equipped with a fume extraction system and an electric traverse drive with a manual backup system. The main gun has a dead-zone over the commander's hatch (between the 10:00 and 11:00 o'clock positions), where the gun must be elevated over the infra-red searchlight to avoid crushing it. When the gun is facing backwards, it prevents hatches on top of the troop compartment from opening. The low profile of the turret makes it a difficult target. The same turret is used in the BMD-1.

==== Gunner's station ====
The gunner's station is located to the left of the main gun, and has a single piece hatch that opens forward. The gunner has a dual mode (day/night) 1PN22M1 6x/6.7x magnification image intensifying monocular periscope sight, four day-use periscope vision blocks, and an OU-3GK removable infrared or white-light searchlight. The dual mode monocular1PN22M1 sight has a maximum range of 400 metres (440 yd) at night, 900 metres (980 yd) with the use of the infra-red searchlight. In day mode, the sight has a 6x magnification with a 15° field of view, while in image intensification mode it has a 6.7x magnification with a 6° field of view. The gunner can calculate range to a target either by use of graticule lines in the sight, or a secondary stadiametric rangefinder.

The original sight was replaced with the 1PN22M2, which has an additional scale for the OG-15V HE-Frag rounds used by the Ob'yekt 765Sp3, produced from July 1974. The new sight has two day scales for the two projectiles – one from 200 to 1,600 metres (220 to 1,750 yd) and the other from 400 to 1,300 metres (440 to 1,420 yd).

==== Armament ====
Gun

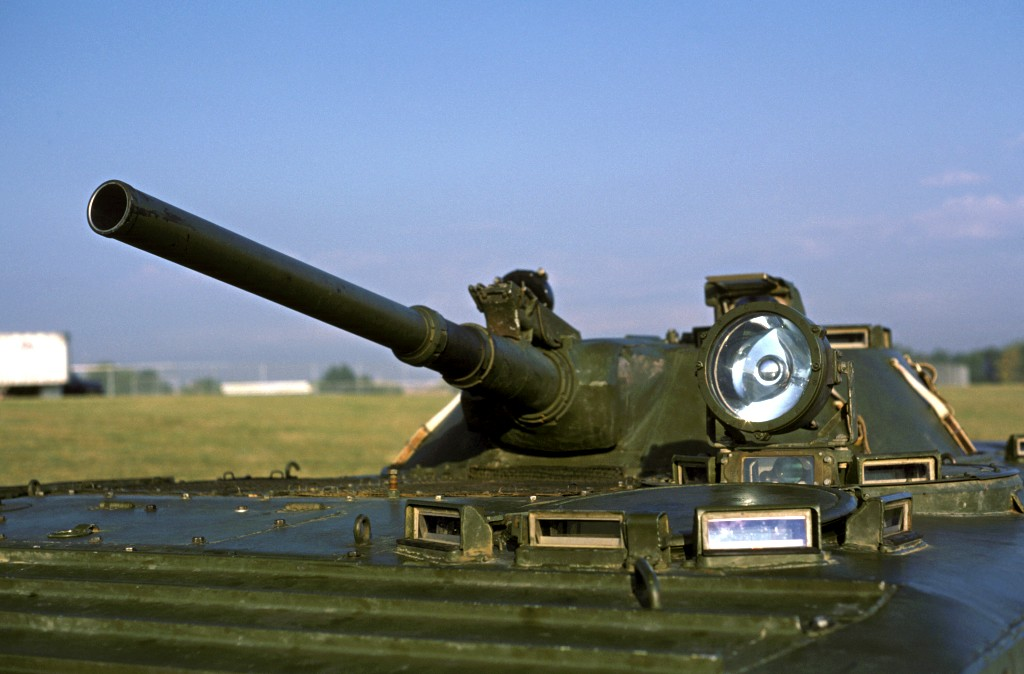
A view of the BMP-1's turret at Bolling Air Force Base

The main armament is the 73 mm 2A28 "Grom" low pressure, smoothbore, short-recoil, semi-automatic gun. It is fed from a 40-round magazine located around the turret ring. The cyclic rate of fire is 8 to 10 rounds per minute, limited by the need for the gun returns to an elevation of +3° 30' to reload after each shot if the autoloader is used. The gun can be reloaded by hand if necessary. Some units removed the autoloader altogether when new vehicles were delivered, but the mechanized ammunition conveyor magazine was kept. High-explosive ammunition, introduced in 1974, can only be loaded manually, from a conveyor.

The 2A28 'Grom' smoothbore gun fires the same PG-15V projectiles as the SPG-9 infantry light recoilless gun, but with a smaller propellant charge. The PG-15V HEAT warhead can penetrate 280 to 350 mm (11 to 14 in) of steel armor – more than enough to penetrate the frontal armor of NATO MBTs of the 1970s, such as the US M60A1, the British Chieftain or the German Leopard 1. The modernized PG-9 shell is able to penetrate up to 400 mm (16 in) of steel armor. Under battlefield conditions, it has a maximum effective range of 500 m (550 yd).

The disadvantage of the BMP-1 is the small elevation angle of the gun (only 15 degrees).

OG-15V high explosive ammunition was made available from 1974. The warhead has twice the weight of explosives as the anti-armor PG-15V. It is intended for use against troops or soft targets.

A coaxial 7.62 mm PKT machine gun is mounted to the right of the main armament for which the BMP-1 carries 2,000 rounds.

The 2A28 'Grom' gun and PKT coaxial machine gun cannot be accurately fired while the vehicle is on the move over rough ground as the turret is unstabilised.

Missile

Mounted on the gun mantlet, the ATGM launcher is capable of firing the 9M14 Malyutka, (NATO: AT-3A Sagger A), the 9M14M Malyutka-M (NATO: AT-3B Sagger B) and the 9M14P Malyutka-P (NATO: AT-3C Sagger C). All are intended to be used against enemy MBTs and other AFVs at distances from 500 to 3,000 m (550 to 3,280 yd). These ATGMs can penetrate up to 400 mm (16 in) of steel armor (NATO standard at the time). The 9M14P missile can be used in manual mode only, like older missiles, without the advantage of semi-automatic guidance.

The BMP-1 carries four ATGMs with their launching rails as a standard (two inside the turret and two inside the hull). In theory, a fifth missile can be carried on the launcher. The missiles are loaded onto a rail launcher through a small rectangular hatch in a turret's roof behind the launcher. Each 9M14M weighs 10.9 kg (24 lb), a 9M14P is 11.4 kg (25 lb). These missiles can only be fired in daylight because of the lack of a night sight. A guidance device used in the BMP-1 has the code 9S428.

Besides having the advantages of interference immunity and simple control equipment, wire-guided ATGMs also have disadvantages, such as a relatively low flight speed, response delay, and the inability to load a new missile until the previous one has reached its target, as well as a very long minimum range (500 m (550 yd)). Successful operation of a moving ATGM requires a skilled gunner.

Those BMP-1s still in Russian service that were not modernized to the BMP-1P standard, can now use 9M14-2 Malyutka-2 (NATO: AT-3D Sagger D) ATGMs (developed in 1995), which have either a tandem shaped-charge or high-explosive thermobaric warhead.

The BMP-1 was a threat to NATO APCs, light AFVs, and even MBTs of its time, by use of its main gun or ATGM. Nevertheless, the strong anti-tank focus of its armament didn't provide sufficient firepower against enemy unarmored vehicles, infantry and light fortified positions, especially during mountain battles (mostly due to the low elevation angle of the main gun). The appearance of the more successful BMP-2 armed with the 30mm 2A42 dual-purpose autocannon solved this serious problem.

=== Troop compartment ===
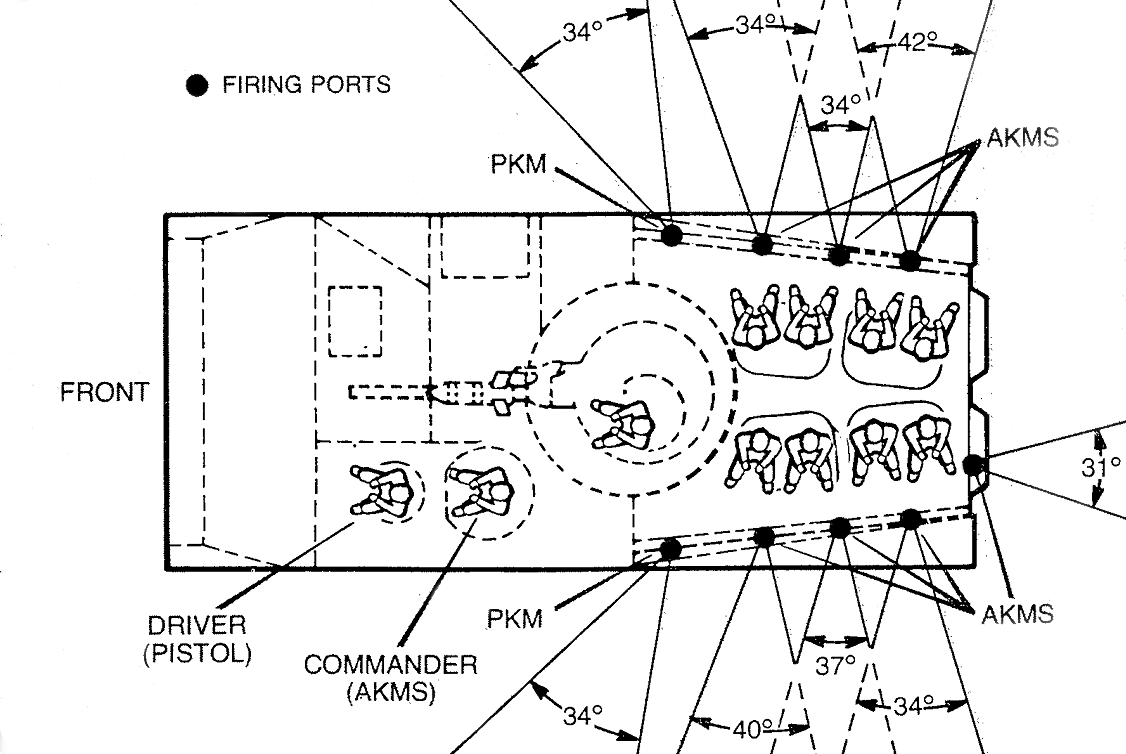
The BMP-1's firing ports location and firing arcs

The troop compartment located at the rear of the vehicle can carry up to eight soldiers. There are four firing ports on each side of the vehicle and a single firing port in the left rear door. A combination fume extractor hose and cartridge deflector is provided to clip on to weapons at each station.

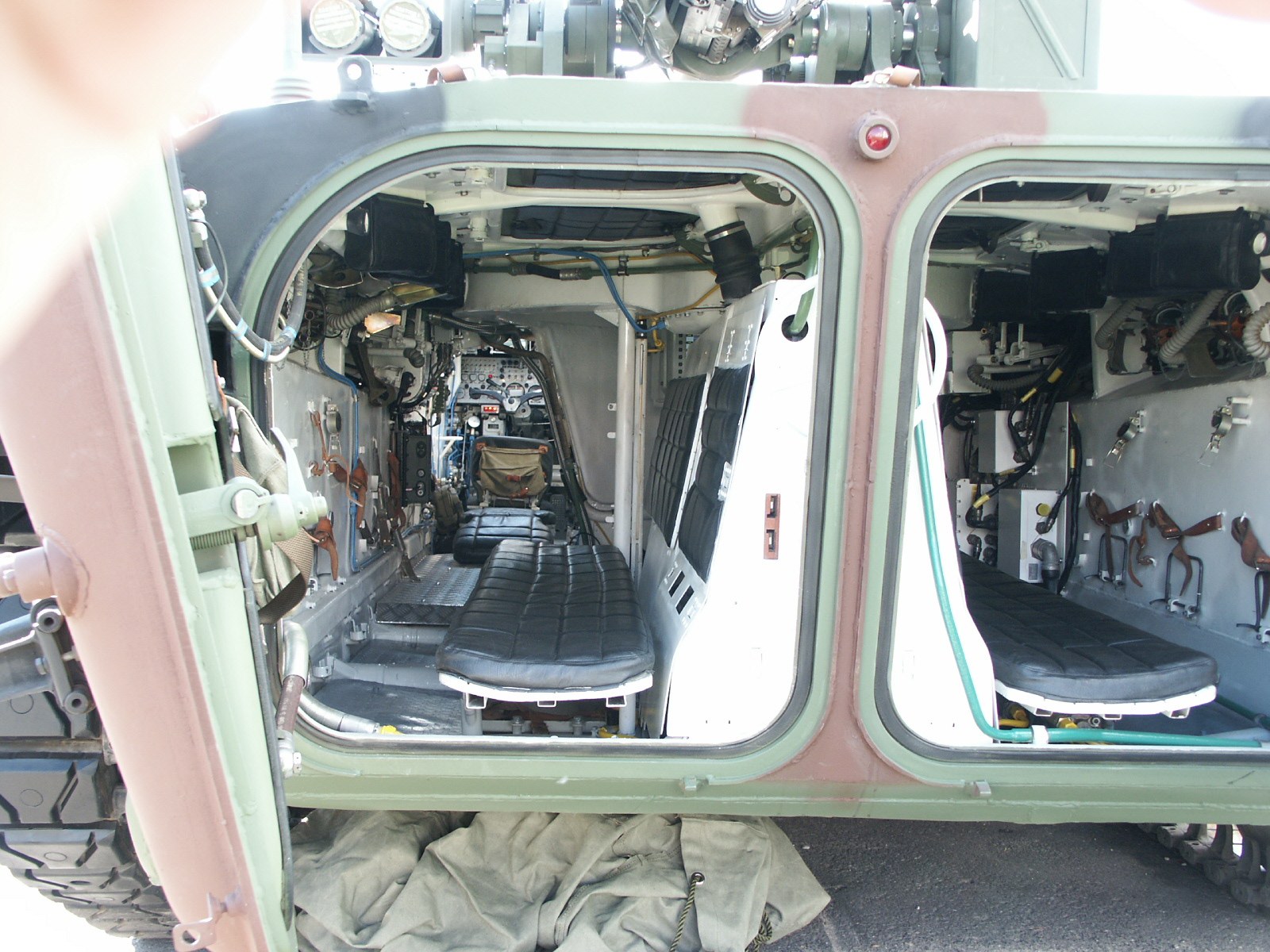
A BMP-1 troop compartment (Polish-modified)

Soldiers sit on two padded benches along the center line of the vehicle and face the sides. Vehicle batteries, electric equipment and the main 330 L (73 imp gal; 87 US gal) fuel tank are located between the benches, with tool stowage beneath. There are four large D-shaped hatches in the roof of the hull, which can be opened from the troop compartment. The airtight rear doors of the troop compartment contain fuel tanks.

Space inside the troop compartment is limited. There is little room for personal equipment, which leads to it being stowed outside while on operation, sometimes limiting rearward traverse of the turret. The seating is cramped, especially for troops in full battle dress.

In the BMP-1 and BMP-2, ammunition is stored near or even inside the compartment, which can lead to a catastrophic failure in case of a hull breach.

=== Maneuverability ===
The 300 horsepower (220 kilowatts) UTD-20 six-cylinder four-stroke diesel engine is located in the centre of the front hull, behind the transmission, with the cooling system to the right and radiator above. The engine drives a manual gearbox with five forward and one reverse gear. The steering system considerably reduces driver fatigue, especially when compared to the usual lever systems to control the tracks in the older tracked AFVs. The BMP is very fast and maneuverable, even if the long, pointed nose can give some problems when crossing large trenches. The fuel tanks have a maximum capacity of 462 litres (102 imp gal). The diesel engine is of a multifuel design and can use DL (summer) or DZ (winter). It can also use TS-1 kerosene.

The BMP-1 has a maximum road speed of 65 kilometres per hour (40 mph), which is automatically reduced to around 45 kilometres per hour (28 mph) off-road.

The BMP-1 can climb 70-centimetre (28 in) high vertical obstacles, and cross a 2.5-metre (8.2 ft) wide trench. It can be driven on 25° side slopes and can climb 35° slopes.

The drive sprockets are at the front with six road wheels, using torsion bar suspension. The BMP-1 has a ground pressure of 0.6 kg/cm^{2} (8.5 psi) and is able to cross snow-covered and boggy terrain. It has the range, off-road speed and cross-country ability necessary to keep up with fast-moving MBTs.

==== Amphibious capability ====
The BMP-1 is amphibious, propelling itself in the water using its tracks, assisted by hydrodynamic fairings on the track upper side covers. The top swimming speed is 8 kilometres per hour (5.0 mph). The shape of the hull and some features (hollow road wheels and road wheel arms with air chambers) aid flotation. The BMP-1 can overcome water barriers with a current of up to 1.2 metres per second (2.7 mph) and waves up to 25 centimetres (9.8 in) high. More challenging conditions require engineer support.

Before entering the water, the trim vane at the front of the hull should be erected to prevent water from flooding over the bow. While in its travelling position, it serves as additional frontal armor. The rear doors of the troop compartment must be closed tightly before entering the water. Before entering the water, either a full crew of eight troopers or an equivalent ballast must be present in the rear of the vehicle, otherwise vehicle balance is upset and it could sink, as it's naturally front heavy.

The BMP-1 can cross water obstacles such as rivers and lakes but it is not intended for sea landing operations.

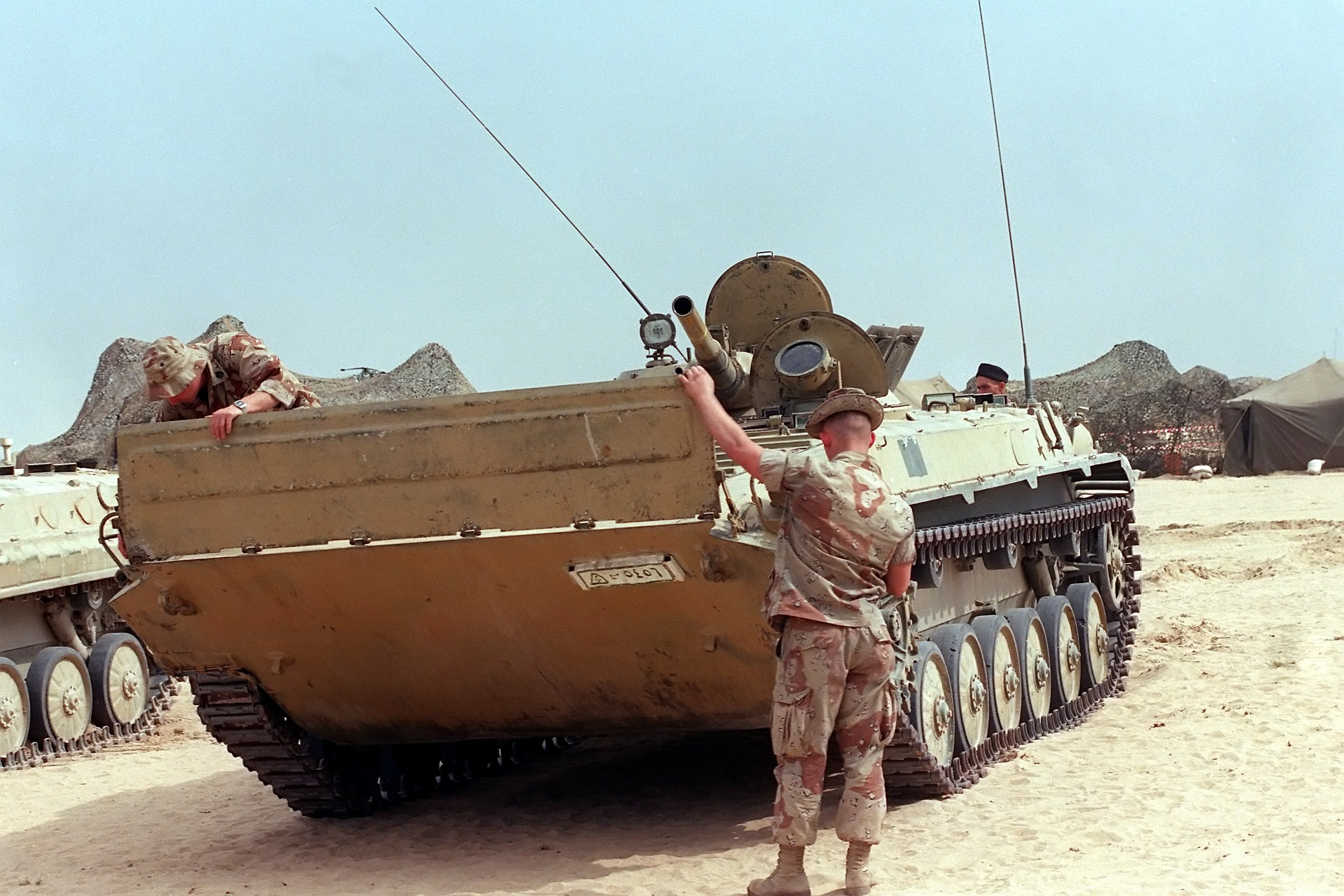
Two US Marines lower the trim vane on the front of an Iraqi BMP-1 captured during Operation Desert Storm, March 1991.

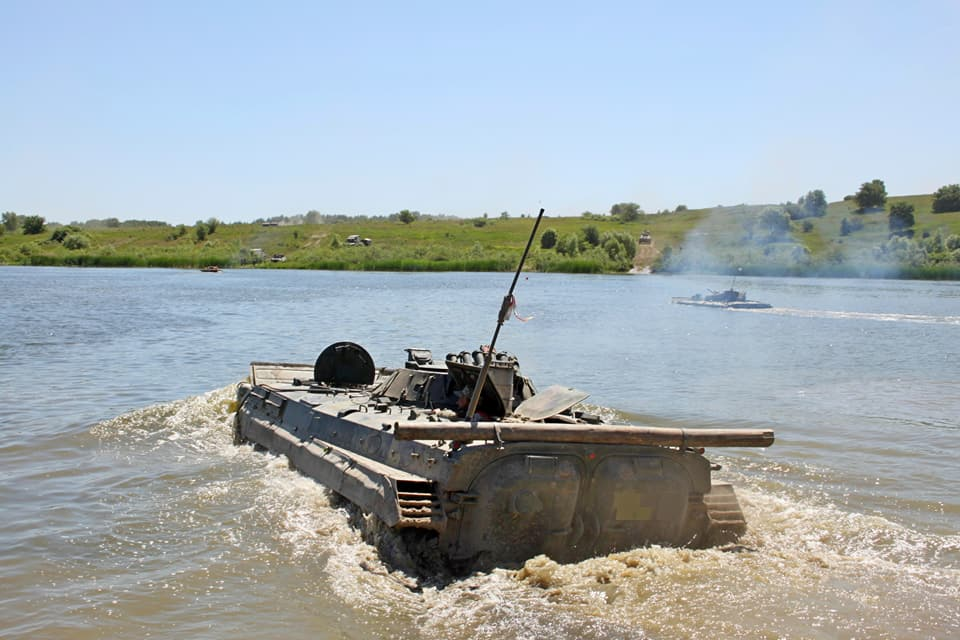
Ukrainian BMP-1s, undertake a water crossing during a training exercise.

=== Armor protection ===
Armor thickness is as follows:
Thickness mm	Angle	Location	LOS thickness mm
26–33		gun mantlet	
23	42°	turret front	36
19	36°	turret side	27
13	30°	turret rear	17
6	0°	turret top	
7	80°	upper hull front	46
19	57°	hull lower front	40
16	14°	hull upper side	19
18	0°	hull lower side	
16	19°	hull rear	19
6	0°	hull top	
7	0°	hull belly rear	

The vehicle's armor is welded rolled steel, varying in thickness between 6 millimetres (0.24 in) thick on the top of the hull and 33 millimetres (1.3 in) on the mantlet of the main gun. The original requirements called for protection against 23 mm armor-piercing rounds across the frontal arc fired from 500 metres (550 yd) and for protection against 7.62 mm armor-piercing rounds across the side and rear arcs from 75 metres (82 yd).

The BMP-1's steeply sloped frontal armor can withstand artillery shell fragments, small arms fire and existing .50 caliber (12.7 mm) heavy machine gun AP and API rounds over 60° of the frontal arc from all distances. The very high angle of the hull frontal armor increases the probability of ricochets, and the trim vane in the traveling position adds little additional protection. On most examples, the front armor is immune to 20 millimeter Oerlikon KAD or HS820 auto-cannon fire from ranges greater than 100 meters, but armor quality varies quite significantly with the nationality of a factory.

The side, rear and top armor protect the BMP-1 from 7.62 mm small arms fire from most distances as well as smaller artillery shell fragments, but do not protect the vehicle against 12.7 mm heavy machine gun fire from close distances or larger artillery shell fragments. Ground tests demonstrated that rear doors with their fuel tanks filled with sand withstood hits from standard 12.7 mm rounds. In Afghanistan and Chechnya, armor-piercing 7.62 mm rounds fired from general-purpose machine guns at ranges of around 30–50 m sometimes penetrated the rear doors and hatches.

During the First Persian Gulf War, the armor protection of the BMP-1 proved vulnerable to the armor-piercing rounds of the US M2/M3 Bradley's 25 millimetres (0.98 in) M242 Bushmaster autocannon. During the intense fighting in Chechnya, no penetration of the BMP-1/BMD-1 turret front armor was noticed because the turret made for a small target and had relatively thick frontal armor compared to other parts of the vehicle.

==== Protection issues ====
The BMP-1 had significant shortcomings in its protection scheme, which only became obvious during the Soviet–Afghan War. It seats its driver and commander in a tandem layout, on the left side of the hull front, alongside the diesel engine. When an antitank mine hits the BMP-1s left track, the explosion usually destroyed one to three left side roadwheels, penetrated the bottom, and killed or seriously wounded both the driver and the commander, which caused painful losses of specialist personnel in the Soviet Army. Drivers laid sandbags on the bottom of their compartment in an effort to protect themselves against possible mine attack. The same kind of explosion under the right track was much less dramatic for the driver and the commander, who remained relatively safe.

The experience of the Yom Kippur War and Soviet–Afghan War showed that the armored hull of the BMP-1 cannot withstand hits of 12.7-mm bullets on the sides, and the hit of an anti-tank rocket-propelled grenade (RPG), as a rule, caused the vehicle to ignite, followed by an explosion of ammunition.

If the vehicle hit a tilt-rod antitank mine, its steeply sloped lower front glacis plate allowed the mine's arming rod to tilt with little resistance until the mine was well under the chassis. When it eventually detonated, the blast was usually sufficient to kill or badly wound the driver and the commander. From 1982, the Soviet 40th Army in Afghanistan began to receive improved BMP-1Ds (the so-called "Afghan" variant), which, among other improvements, included an additional armored plate under the driver's and commander's stations. This situation was addressed in the later BMP-2 design, where the commander shares the two-man turret with the gunner. The driver's and engine compartments could be equipped with additional bottom armor for improved protection against landmines filled with up to 2.5 kilograms (5.5 lb) of explosives.

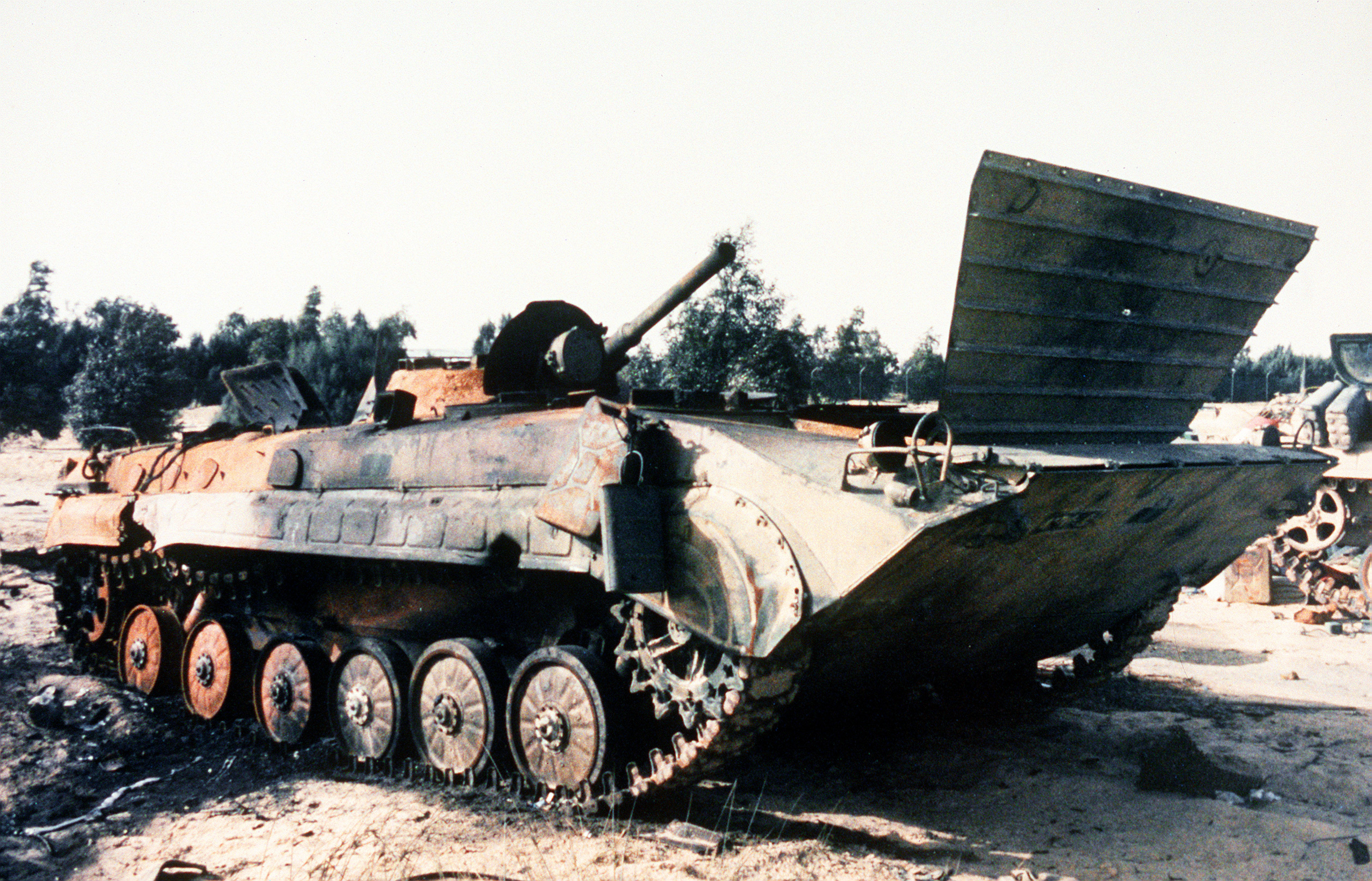
Iraqi BMP-1 in a field after being hit several times and burnt out during Operation Desert Storm, 1 February 1991

There is a protection issue concerning the reloading of the 9M14 "Malyutka" and 9M14M "Malyutka-M" ATGMs in NBC conditions, because doing it through the small hatch from inside the vehicle would negate whatever protection the fighting compartment's NBC protection suite gave.

The compactness and low silhouette of the vehicle are generally advantages on a battlefield. Critical areas, such as the engine compartment, the ammunition storage area, fuel cells and the troop compartment, are located in a manner that became the standard for many IFVs and APCs. Penetration anywhere in these areas will often result in mobility and/or firepower damage and/or disabling of the personnel.

The BMP-1 and BMP-2 series vehicles share a major drawback with many Soviet tanks. Ammunition is stored near or even inside the fighting compartment, which makes them more vulnerable to a hit from an anti-tank round or a missile across the side arc. If that happens, the ammunition often explodes, killing everyone and completely destroying the vehicle. During the fighting in Afghanistan and Chechnya, hits by RPGs penetrated the BMP-1's armor in 95% of cases. This often resulted in the vehicle burning until the ammunition exploded. Due to these limitations, Soviet/Russian soldiers customarily rode on the outside of the BMP-1, sitting on top of the hull while in combat zones.

The armor of BMP-1 IFVs is insufficient to deal with AP cannon rounds – sufficiently thick armor would increase the weight of the BMP-1 considerably and jeopardize its amphibious ability. Some military analysts support the idea of returning to the concept of open-topped APCs, as the armor of light AFVs cannot protect the crew from anti-tank weapons. Modern APCs are mostly used in local conflicts instead of hypothetical large-scale wars with NBC weapons.

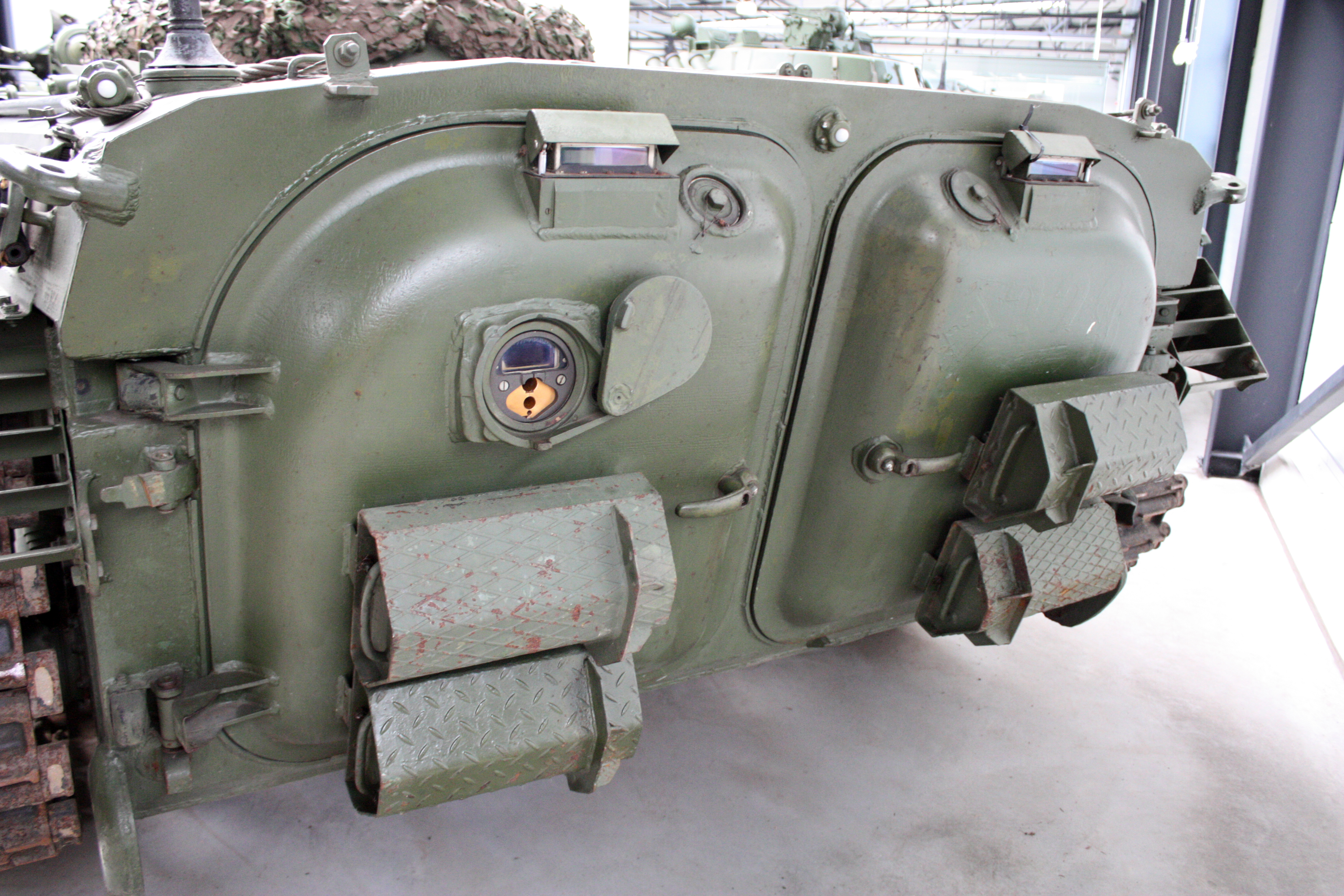
The rear doors are hollow fuel tanks, each has a periscope at the top, and the left door has a firing port.

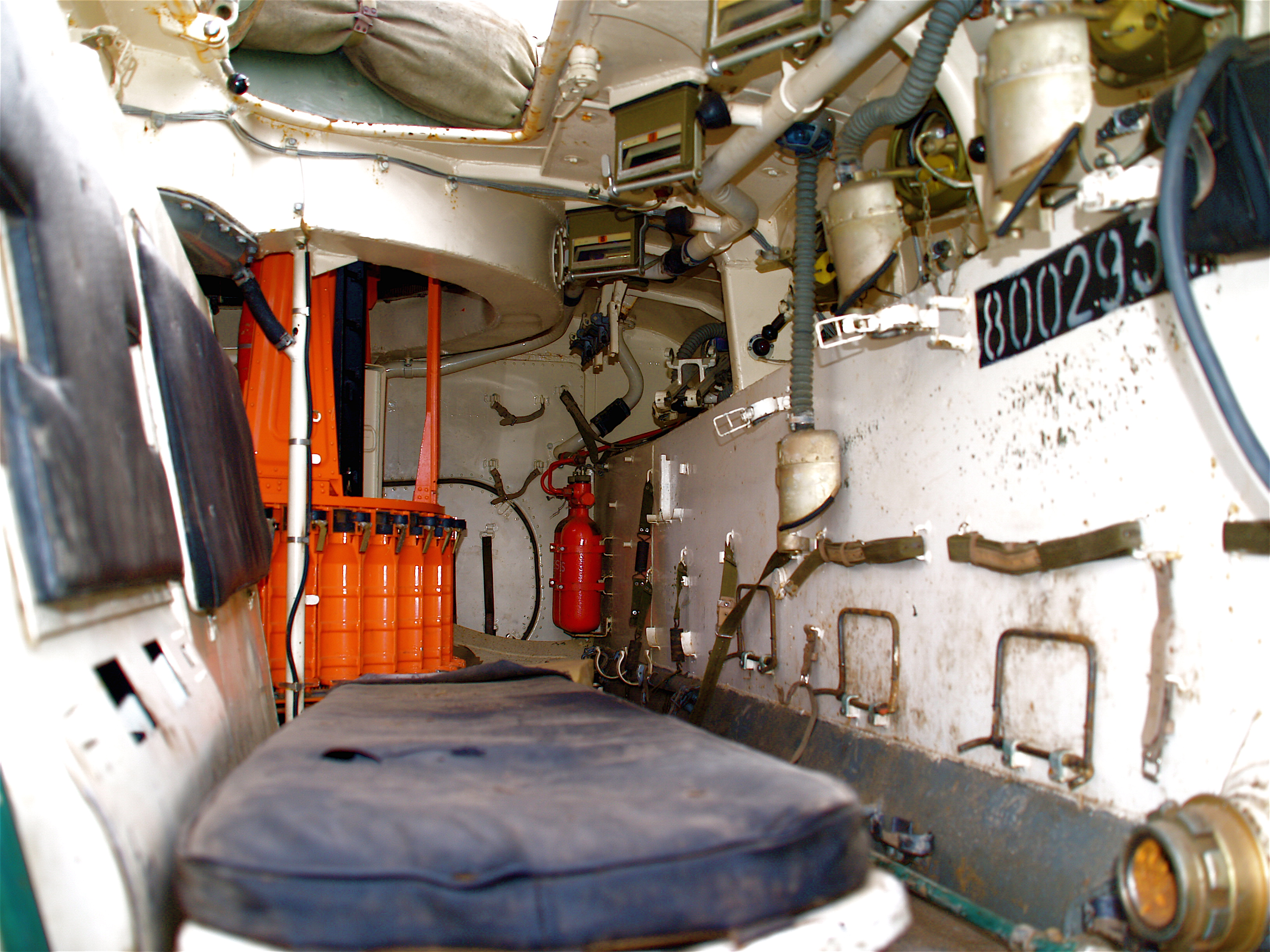
One side of the troop compartment. Seats are back to back with a fuel tank between them. Fume extractors can be seen on the hull to the right, these clip on to weapons when they are used through the firing ports.

A problem most often cited by western analysts is the design of the main fuel tank. Due to the low profile of the vehicle, the designers have had to place the fuel tank between the two rows of outward-facing seats, meaning that the infantrymen sit very close to the bulk of the vehicle's fuel storage. Extra fuel is carried in the hollow armored rear doors. Therefore, a hit by an armor-piercing incendiary round would set the fuel contained there on fire, especially if the fuel is kerosene instead of diesel. The burning fuel would move into the crew compartment, resulting in the death or injury of the infantrymen (if they are unable to leave the vehicle via the roof hatches), and a possible explosion.

However, the rear door tanks are almost always empty when the BMP goes into combat, as they are only meant to increase the road travel range of the vehicle. In intense war areas where the BMP sees action often, and it is relatively near its base of operations, instructions highly recommend detaching the rear door tanks from the fuel system, filling them with sand as additional protection for the troop compartment, and adding fuel to the internal main fuel tank from other sources when the need arises.

This was not practiced by some BMP-1s crews during a number of local conflicts, e.g., in Chechnya, which resulted in frequent attempts by the enemy to hit the rear doors of the BMP-1s. The inner fuel tank is more vulnerable than that of many modern IFVs – the thin side armor means that penetration is likely to occur to the inner fuel tank as well.

The BMP-1 has no air conditioning or air cooling system. Its crew members and passengers suffer heavily in hot climates as its air filtration system and exhaust-ventilation fans cannot provide any comfort at high temperatures. During the Yom Kippur War, crews kept some of the roof hatches open. This meant that they were vulnerable to machine gun fire from higher ground. Only a few examples of the BMP-1 were intended for export – mainly to countries with a hot climate (for example, the Slovak-Belarusian "Cobra-S"). They are equipped with an air conditioning system. The cooling system for the engine is improved, as is the additional forced air cooling system of the engine compartment and radiator. The exhaust system helps to eject gases together with hot air from the engine compartment through the grille located on the right side of the hull roof in front of the turret.

=== Equipment ===
The BMP-1 can make its own smoke screen by injecting vaporized diesel fuel into the exhaust manifold using the TDA engine thermal smoke generating system. Later models have an array of 902V Tucha smoke grenade launchers which can form a screen 80 m (87 yd) wide, 200 to 300 m (220 to 330 yd) in front of the vehicle.

A number of BMP-1s were fitted with mountings for the KMT-10 plow-type mine-clearing system in the early 1980s. It is installed on the front of the hull in line with the tracks. The plow weighs 450 kg (990 lb) and can be attached in 30 minutes. Emergency detaching takes around 10 minutes. The KMT-10 is intended for clearing anti-tank mines under different ground conditions.

It is pneumatically driven and takes four seconds to switch from the traveling position to the digging position. The mine-clearing plows are very narrow, with just two digging tines, each 300 mm (12 in) wide, (the same as each track), which limits them to clearing surface-laid mines, in particular scatterable anti-tank mines. A chain mounted between the plows can detonate tilt-rod mines. The maximum mine-clearing speed is 15 km/h (9.3 mph).

When the NBC protection system is configured and operating, the crew and passengers are protected from chemical weapons, biological agents and nuclear fallout by an air filtration and overpressure system, which consists of the NBC filter element and the blower/dust separator.

BMP-1s were equipped with one RPG-7/RPG-7V shoulder-launched anti-tank RPG and five PG-7 rounds or one 9K32 Strela-2/9K38 Igla man-portable anti-aircraft missile launcher and two replacement missiles. It carries 1600 rounds for two PK general-purpose machine guns.

== Service history ==
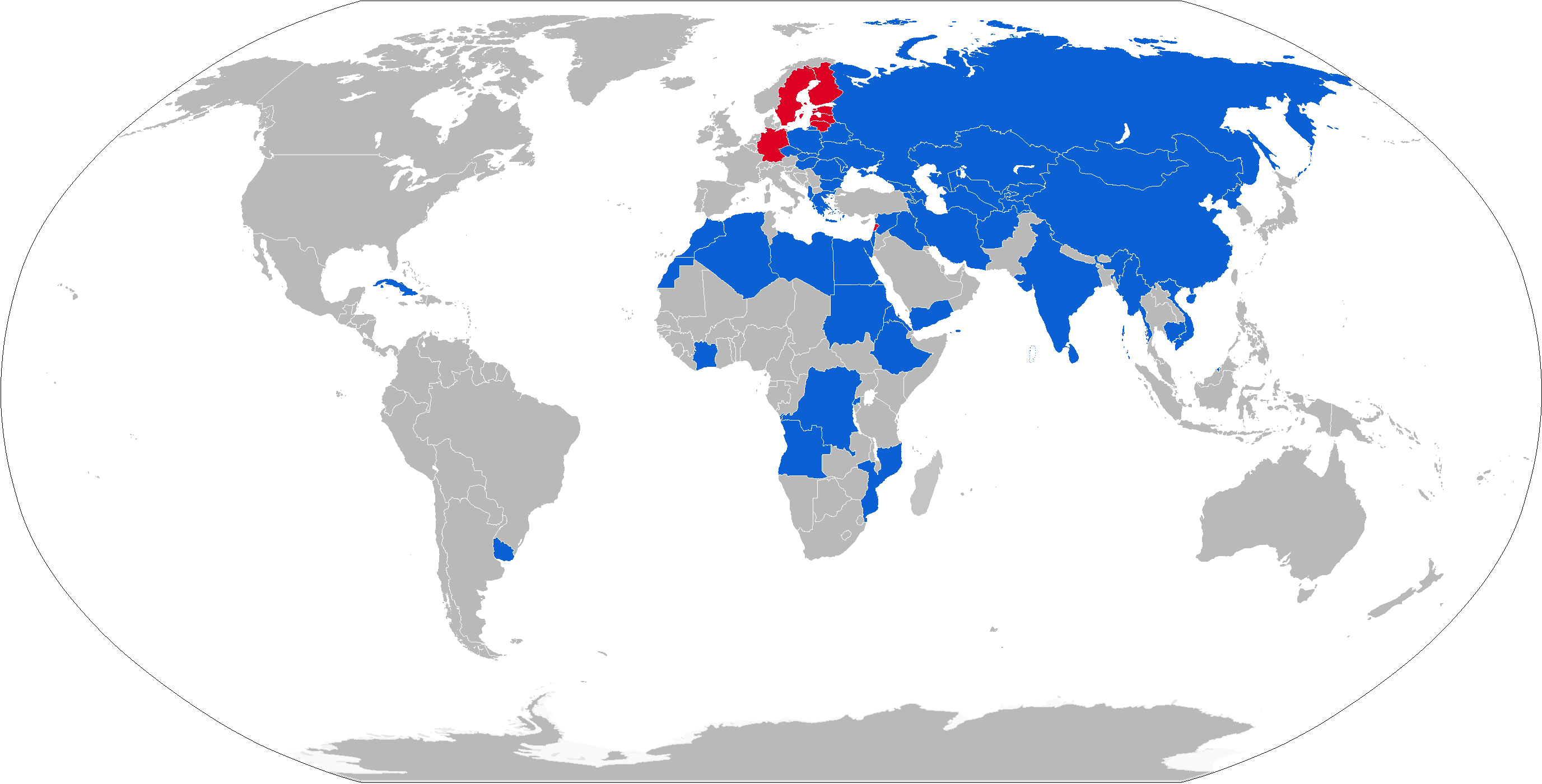
Operators: Current Former

Currently, the major BMP-1 operators, each with over a thousand vehicles in active service, are Russia, India, Poland, and the People's Republic of China.

=== Soviet Union and Russia ===
The BMP-1 entered service with the Soviet Army in 1966. The BMP-1 was first seen by Westerners during the 7 November 1967 military parade in Moscow. Its appearance created a stir in the West, where lightly armed APCs were still the norm for transportation and infantry support on the battlefield.

In the Soviet Army, BMP-1s were typically issued to motorized rifle divisions and the motorized rifle regiments of tank divisions, where they replaced the BTR-152, BTR-50P and some BTR-60P APCs.

Currently, BMP-1s and vehicles based upon it are used by the Russian Army and internal security troops of the Russian Ministry of Internal Affairs (MVD).

==== War in Afghanistan ====
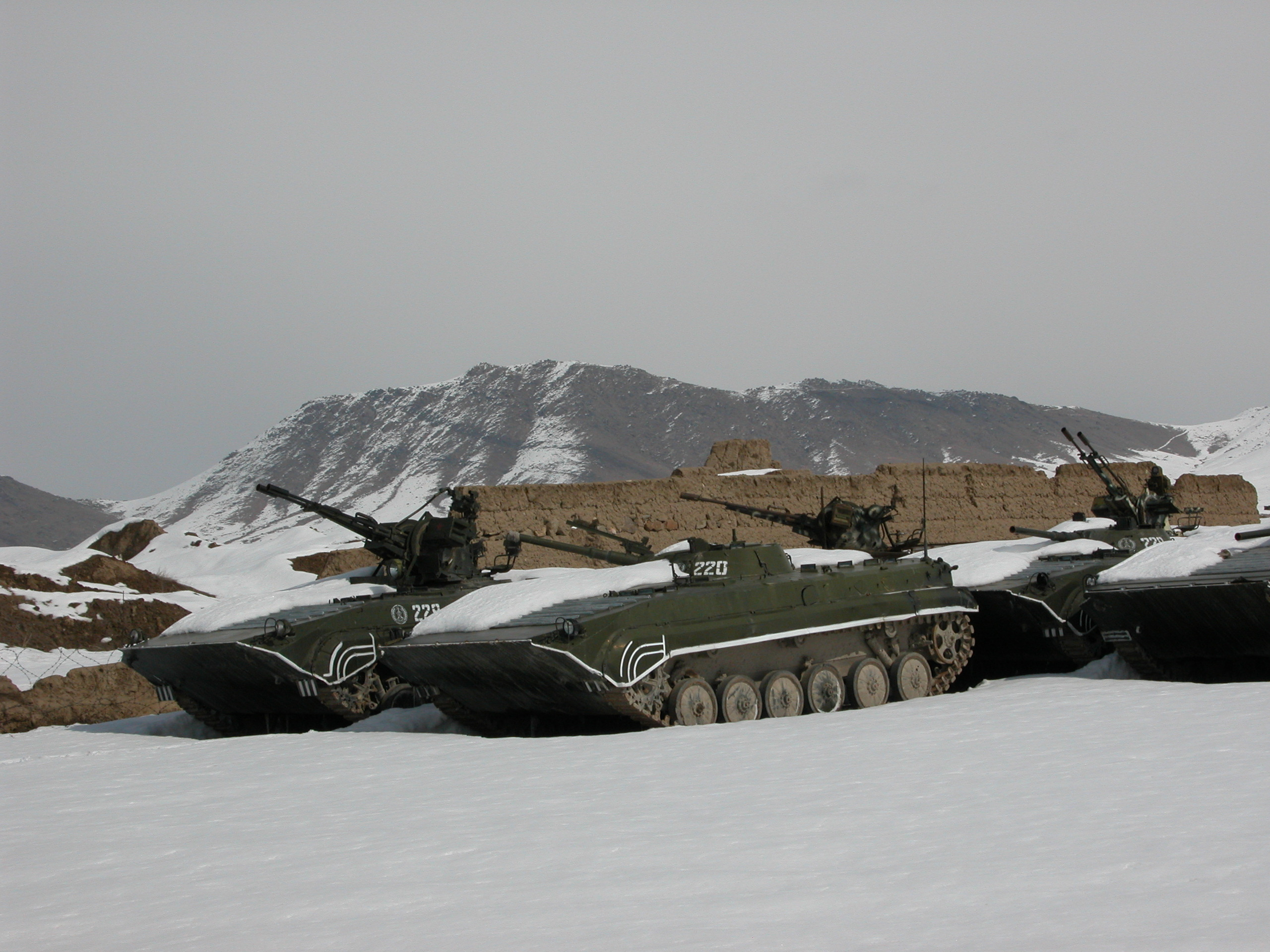
Two abandoned Afghan Army BMP-1s in Afghanistan in 2005.

BMP-1s were widely used in the Soviet-Afghan war by motorized rifle and tank units, as well as by Afghan Army units loyal to the PDPA during the Saur Revolution. They were also operated by some special forces. In 1982, as a result of combat experience, a version with applique armor was introduced, called BMP-1D (D='desantnaya'=paratroopers). That version did not have amphibious capability (not critical in the Afghan environment). Many field modifications were made to their BMP-1s by various units. In May 2023, the Taliban used BMP-1s against Iranian border guards.

==== Syrian Civil War ====
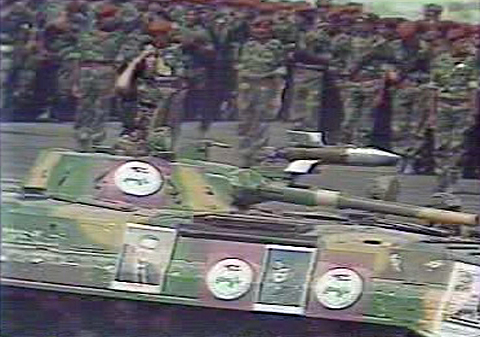
Syrian BMP-1 during military parade in 1990.

The BMP-1 has seen wide use by all factions fighting in the Syrian Civil War due to large numbers being in stock.

Since 2017 the Hay'at Tahrir al-Sham have been using captured BMP-1s as vehicle-borne improvised explosive devices in suicide attacks. The vehicle's advantages in this role are the large amount of explosives it can carry, the off-road capability afforded by tracks and the armour that both protects the driver from fire and amplifies the effect of the explosion.

==== Russian-Ukrainian War ====
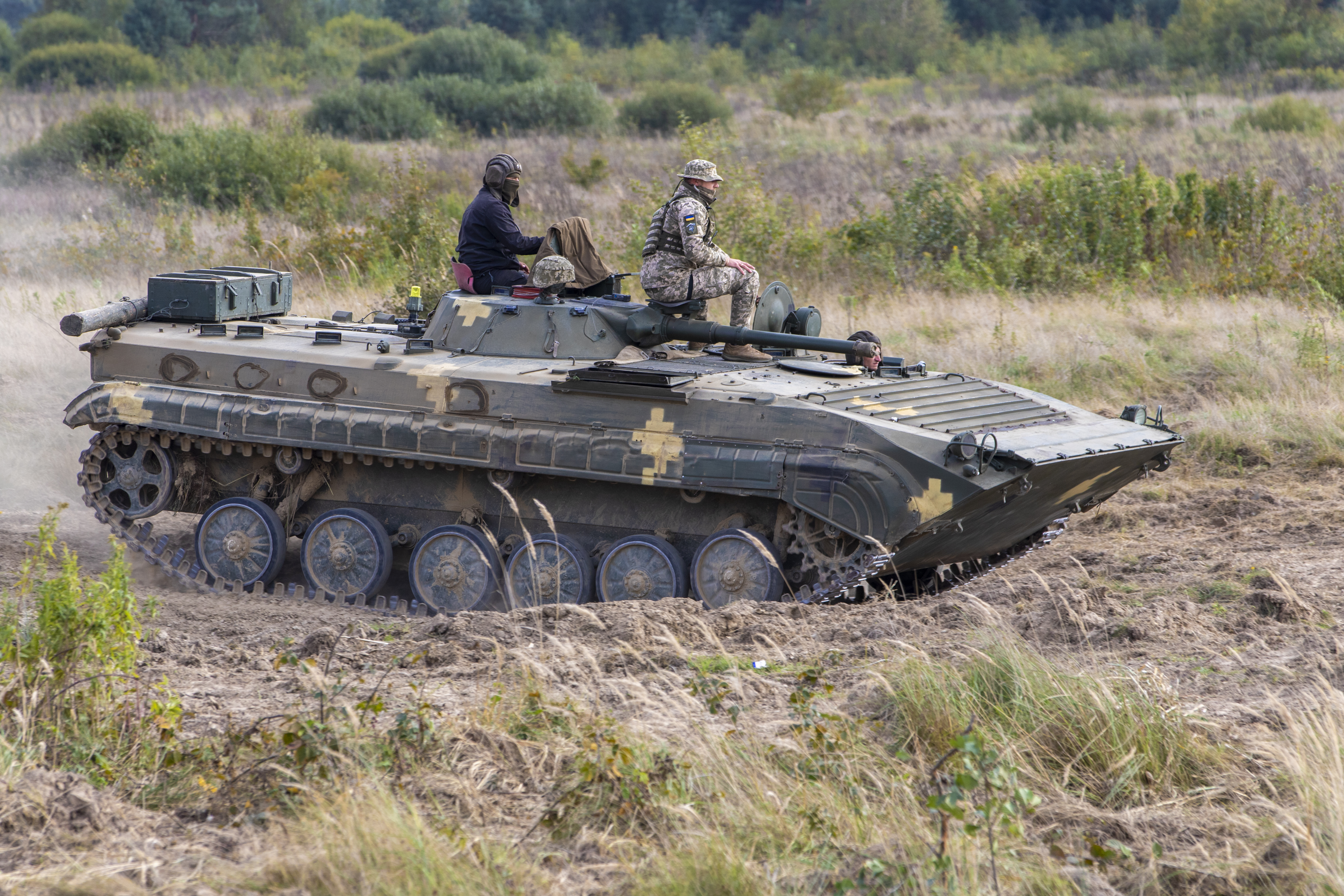
Ukrainian army BMP-1

The BMP-1 is still currently being used in the ongoing Russian invasion of Ukraine by both Russian and Ukrainian forces due to its wide availability compared to the much more modern but less produced BMP-3. As of August 27, 2025, Russian losses in the war have been visually confirmed at 1,184 BMP-1s of various variants (940 destroyed, 33 damaged, 103 abandoned, and 108 captured). Ukrainian losses have been confirmed at 495 various BMP-1s (387 destroyed, 15 damaged, 33 abandoned, 60 captured).

=== Others ===
Other BMP operators have included Poland, Egypt, Syria, the People's Republic of China, Afghanistan, India, Iraq, North Korea, East Germany, Greece, Slovakia, Sweden, Cambodia and Vietnam.

- The Ontario Regiment Museum has an operational BMP 1.

== See also ==
Comparable vehicles

- BMD-1 – (Soviet Union) – related family of airborne fighting vehicles
- BMP-2 – (Soviet Union)
- BMP-3 – (Soviet Union, Russia)
- BMP-23 – (Bulgaria)
- AMX-10P – (France)
- ASCOD – (Spain, Austria)
- BVP M80 IFV – (Yugoslavia)
- Combat Vehicle 90 – (Sweden)
- Dardo IFV – (Italy)
- Lazika – (Georgia),
- M2 Bradley – (United States)
- Marder (IFV) – (West Germany)
- MLI-84 – (Socialist Republic of Romania) – IFV based on a modified BMP chassis
- Type 86 – (China) – variant of the BMP-1
- Warrior IFV – (United Kingdom)
