= MLI-84 =

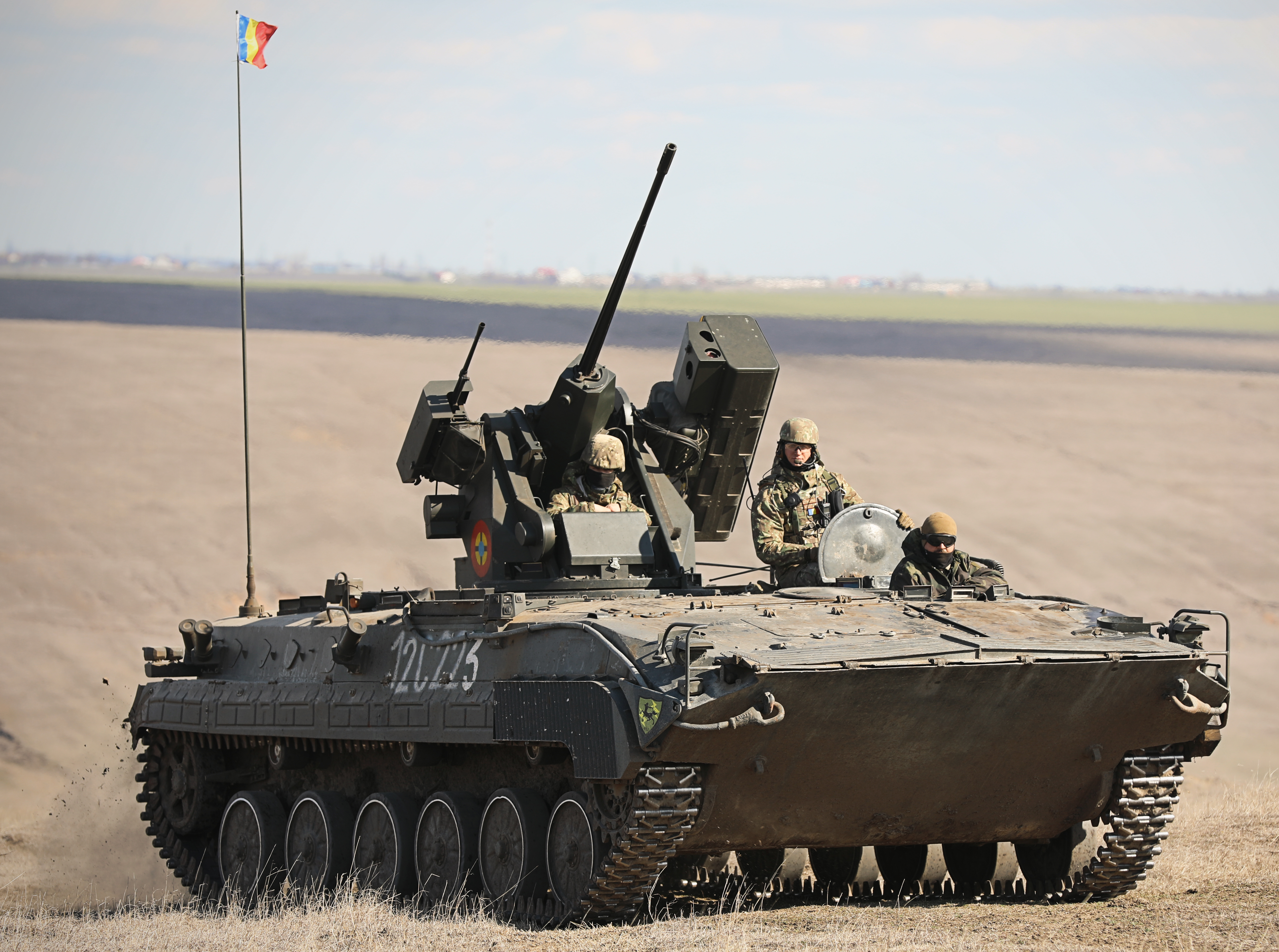
- MLI-84M at Smârdan during exercise Justice Eagle 2021
- Type: Infantry fighting vehicle
- Place of origin: Romania

Service history
- In service: 1985–present
- Used by: Romania

Production history
- Designed: 1982–1985
- Produced: 1985–1991 (MLI-84); 1995–present (MLI-84M)
- No. built: 178
- Variants: See Variants

Specifications (MLI-84M)
- Mass: 17.6 tonnes
- Length: 7.335 m
- Width: 3.3 m
- Height: 2.942 m
- Crew: 3 (commander, driver and gunner) + 8 troops
- Armor: Protects against 12.7 mm caliber heavy machine gun fire
- Main armament: MLI-84: 73 mm 2A28 Grom low-pressure smoothbore cannon MLI-84M1: 25 mm Oerlikon KBA autocannon
- Secondary armament: MLI-84: 9S415 launcher for 9M14 Malyutka ATGM; 1 × 12.7×108mm DShK 1938/46 Heavy machine gun MLI-84M1: 9M14-2T "Maljutka-2T" or Spike ATGM
- Engine: MLI-84: Romanian 8-cylinder-1240-DT-S; MLI-84M1: Caterpillar C9; MLI-84: 355 hp (265 kW); MLI-84M1: 400 hp at 2,200 rpm
- Power/weight: 23.4 hp/tonne (16.8 kW/tonne)
- Suspension: individual torsion bar with hydraulic shock absorbers on the 1st and 6th road wheels
- Ground clearance: 400 mm
- Fuel capacity: 620 l
- Operational range: 550–600 km
- Maximum speed: 65 km/h

The MLI-84 is a tracked Romanian infantry fighting vehicle currently in service with the Romanian Land Forces. It was derived from the chassis of the Soviet BMP-1 but possessing a lengthened hull, a 12.7×108mm DShK 1938/46 heavy machine gun mounted on the roof of the troop compartment and MLI-84M having Oerlikon KBA autocannon and new ATGMs.

== Development history ==
In 1982 Romania purchased a license to produce 178 BMP-1 IFVs from the Soviet Union. At the same time, it received permission to modify the construction in order to adapt it to its industry.

The decision of improving the old Soviet IFVs came in 1995. As a result of a Romanian-Israeli cooperation project, the new modernized MLI-84M variant was created. Since then, the Romanian Ministry of Defense spent around US$ 155 million to upgrade 99 vehicles for equipping three battalions.

== Description ==
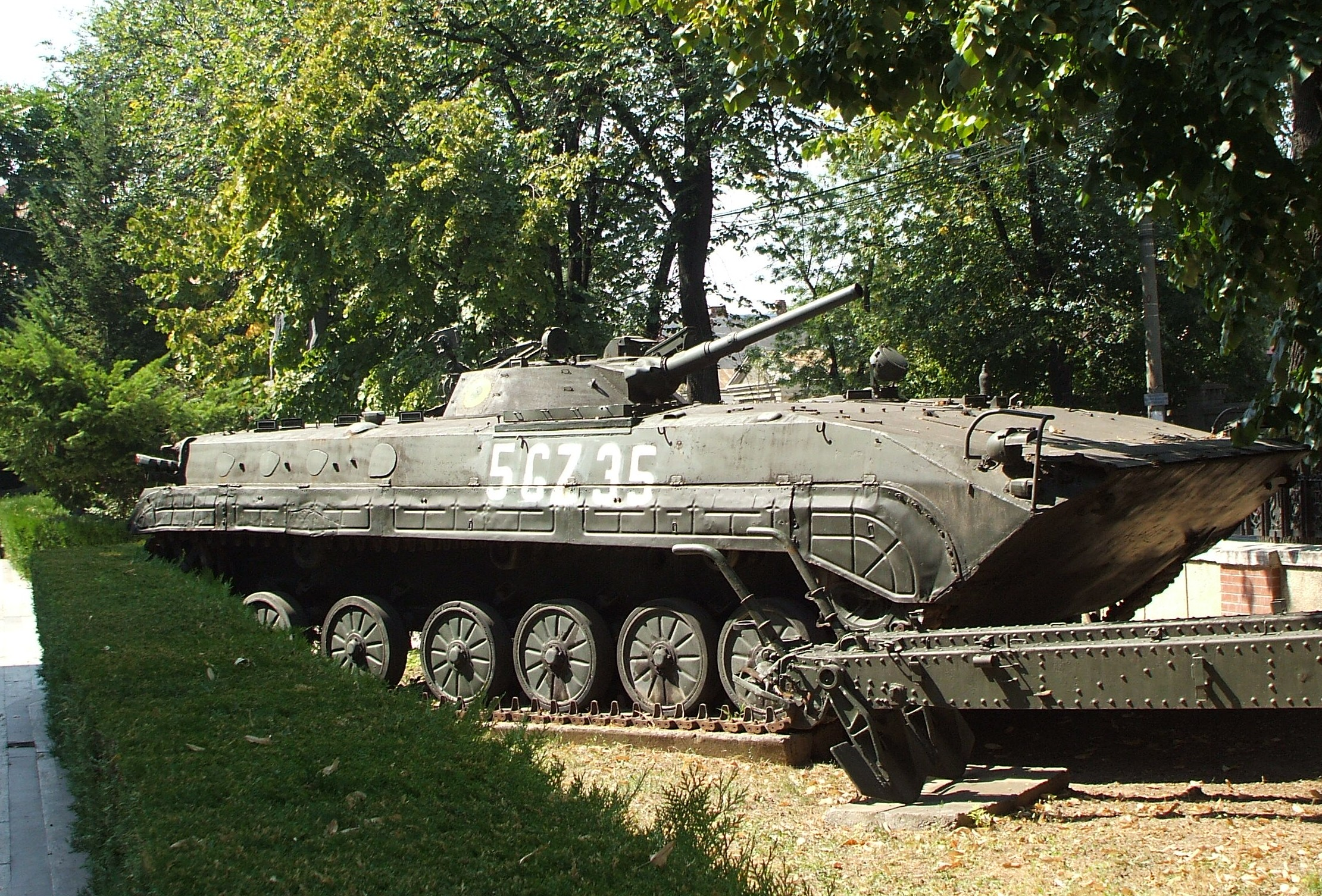
MLI-84 (basic version) on display at the National Military Museum, Bucharest

The most important improvement in the MLI-84 was the replacement of the Soviet UTD-20 (a 4-stroke airless-injection water-cooled multifuel 15.8-litre diesel V6 engine) with the domestically-produced 8V-1240-DT-S 4-stroke liquid-cooled diesel V8 engine. The new engine develops a more powerful 355 horsepower (265 kW), but is larger and heavier and thus required modification of the engine compartment to accommodate it. The fuel capacity was increased to 600 liters. Because of these modifications the length of the hull of the vehicle was increased by 60 centimeters to 7.335 meters, which in turn resulted in wider gaps between the roadwheels. The vehicle is also wider (3.15 m) and higher (2.11 m). The ground clearance has increased from 370 mm to 400 mm. The new engine has increased vehicle's maximal road speed to 70 km/h.

The armament wasn't modified but a 12.7 mm DShK 1938/46 heavy machine gun was placed on a rotatable mount fitted on the left rear troop compartment roof hatch. It is operated by the trooper sitting next to the left rear door of the troop compartment which makes operating it while the infantry is dismounting impossible.

Because of the mentioned modifications and additions, the weight of the vehicle increased to 16.6 tonnes and although the vehicle can still travel across water with little preparation, the amphibious ability was weakened.

== Production history ==
MLI-84 production began in 1985 and 178 vehicles were produced until 1991.

== Variants ==
- MLI-84 – Basic version, as described.
- MLI-84M1 Jderul ("the marten") – MLI-84 modernization fitted with a new Israeli OWS-25R overhead mount turret armed with 25x137mm Oerlikon KBA autocannon and two 9S415 ATGM launchers. It is also equipped with two banks of four 81 mm DLG 81 heat and smoke grenade launchers. Grenades leave a thermal curtain of fire around the vehicle for about five minutes, to confuse enemy missiles. MLI-84M1 vehicle also has a system that can disperse dense smoke over a radius of 360 degrees around the vehicle and at a distance between 300–400 metres (980–1,310 ft). Because mounting of the new turret increased the weight of the vehicle to 17.6 tonnes, a new more powerful engine had to be fitted. The new engine is the Caterpillar C9 engine developing 396 hp (295 kW) which is the same engine as the one found in MOWAG Piranha IIIC IFVs recently acquired by the Romanian Land Forces. However the vehicle lost its ability to travel across water with little preparation and has to be specially prepared before entering water. The vehicle also became even wider (3.3 m) and higher (2.942 m) than its predecessor. Although the engine is more powerful, the weight of the new equipment has in fact decreased the vehicle's maximum road speed to 65 km/h (40 mph). The 9S415 ATGM launcher capable of firing 9M14 "Malyutka" (NATO: AT-3A Sagger A), 9M14M "Malyutka-M" (NATO: AT-3B Sagger B) and 9M14P "Malyutka-P" (NATO: AT-3C Sagger C) ATGMs also has been replaced and there are two different variants, each with a different ATGM launcher replacing it:
  - MLI-84M1 armed with ATGM launcher capable of firing Yugoslavian 9M14-2T Maljutka-2T antitank guided missiles instead of the 9M14 Malyutka.
  - MLI-84M1 armed with ATGM launcher capable of firing Israeli Spike antitank guided missiles instead of the 9M14 Malyutka.
  - MLI-84M1 version with the ATGM launcher horizontally and a remotely operated sight placed at hull.
- MLI-84M Punct de Comanda Batalion – MLI-84M1 converted into a battalion command vehicle with a large superstructure instead of the turret.
- MLI-84M Tractor Pentru Evacuare Tehnică – MLI-84M1 converted into an ARV with its turret replaced by a large three-section hydraulic crane controlled from outside the vehicle, winching frame mounted on the rear of the top of the hull, stowage box on the left hand side of the rear of the top of the hull and two stowage boxes on the right hand side of the top of the hull.
- MLI-84M Vehicul de Evacuare Medicală – MLI-84M1 converted into an armoured ambulance and fitted with a higher superstructure as found on the PCB command vehicle.
- OAPR model 89 – Obuzierul autopropulsat românesc, model 89, self-propelled howitzer using the MLI-84's hull and the 2S1 Gvozdika's turret and gun. Probably designed around 1978 and produced since 1987.

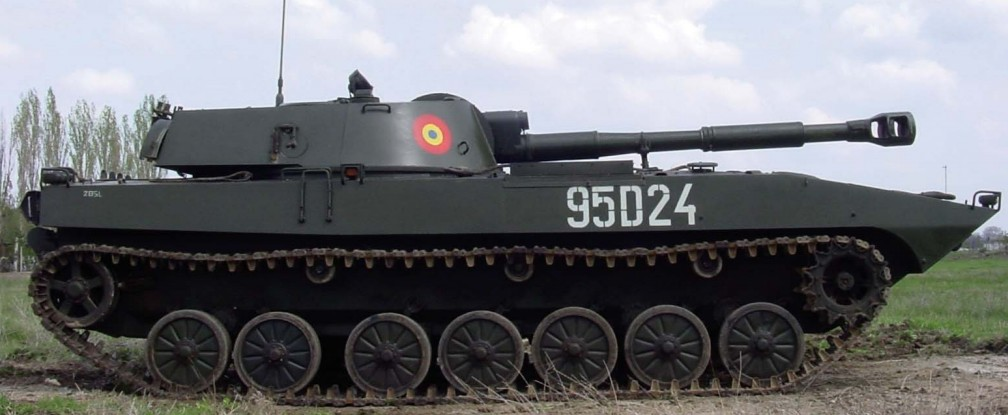
OAPR md. 89 self-propelled howitzer using the MLI-84's chassis and the 2S1 Gvozdika's turret and gun

== Operators ==
- Romania – Romanian Land Forces operate around 142 MLI-84 IFVs of which 101 are upgraded to the MLI-84M standard. The first modernized vehicles entered service with the 282nd Mechanized Brigade in 2005. Initially, the modernization program aimed at upgrading a total of 180 vehicles.

== Gallery ==
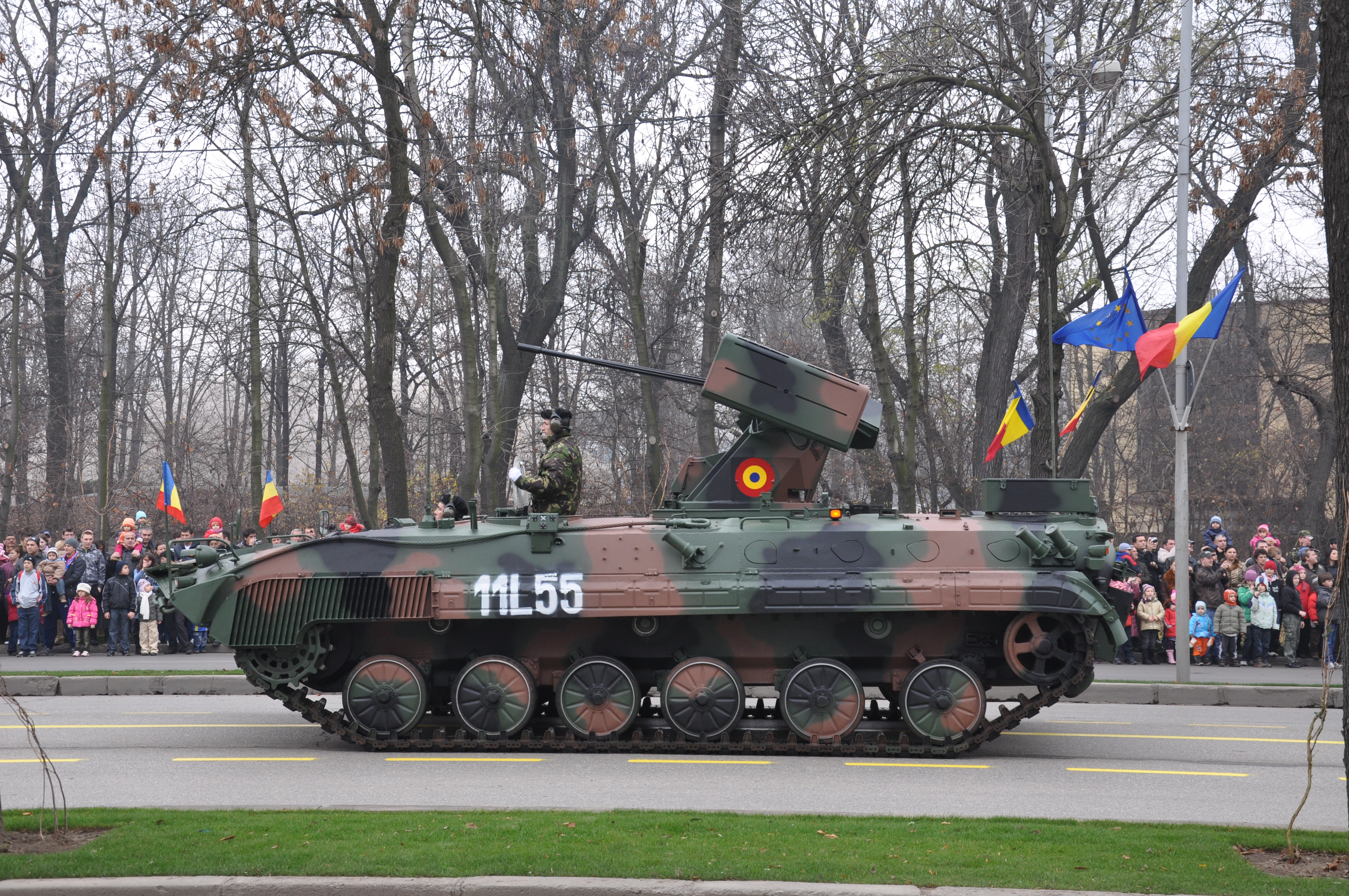
MLI-84M1 at National Day Parade, 2009

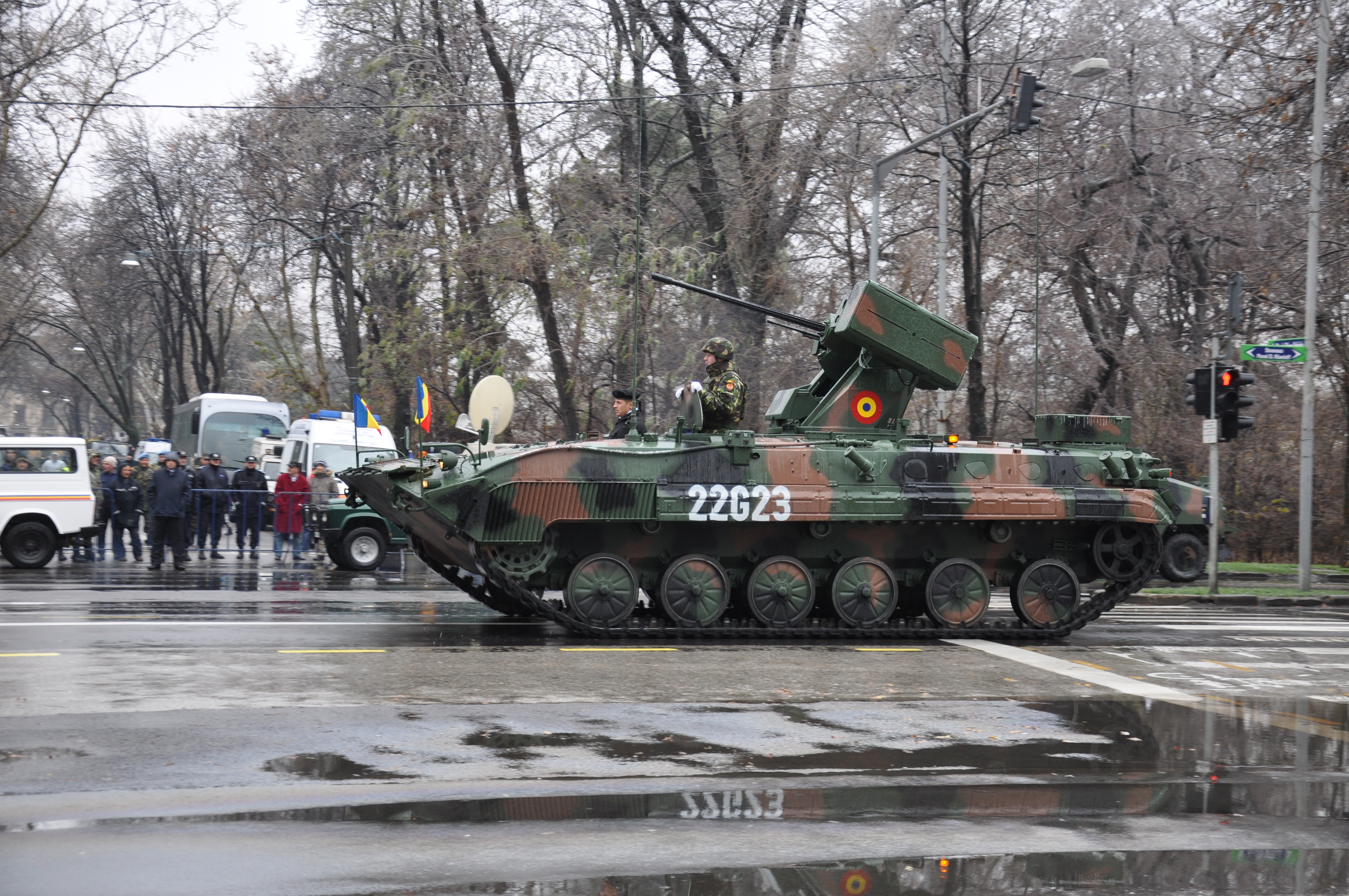
MLI-84M1 at National Day Parade, 2010

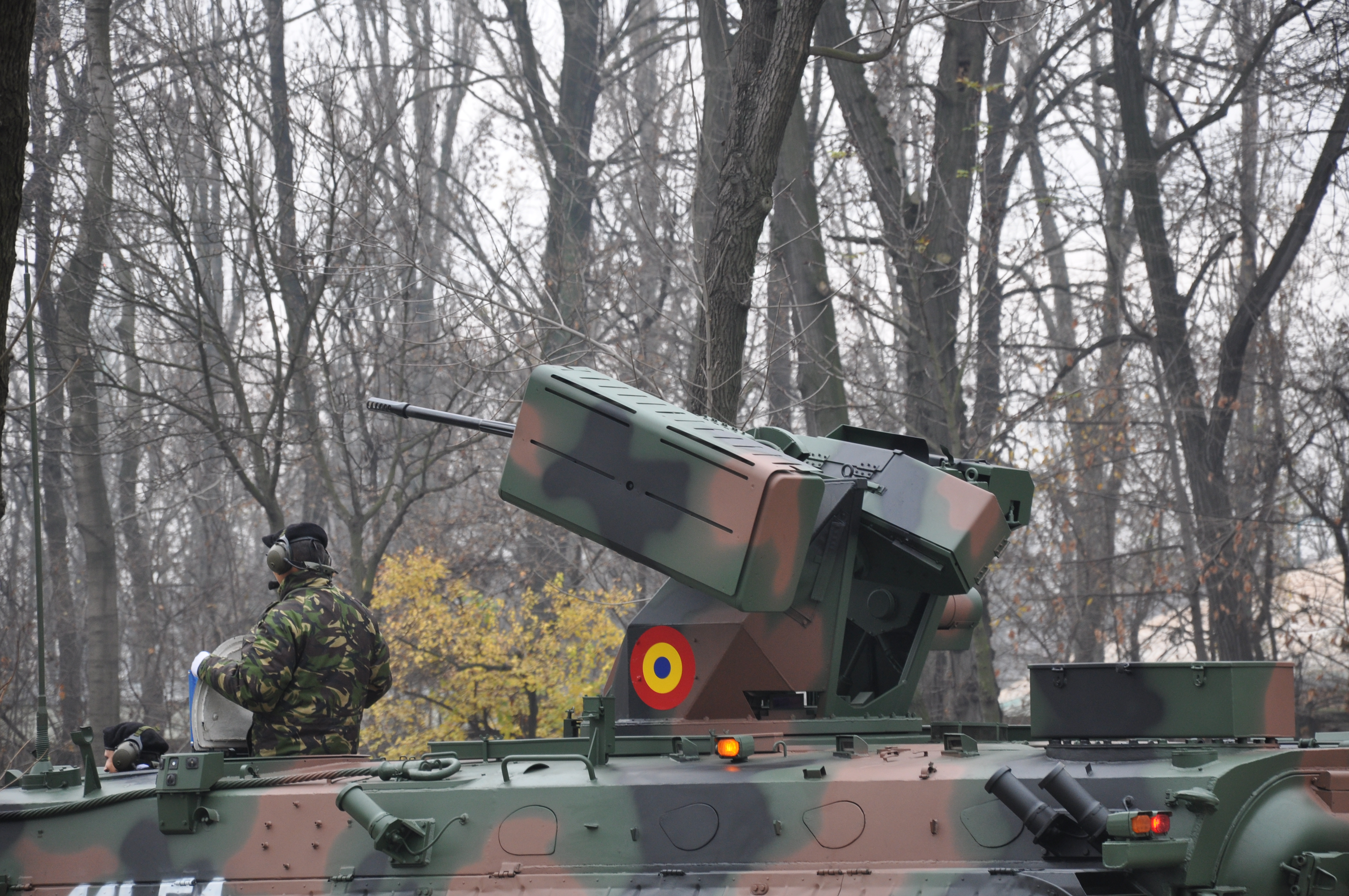
MLI-84M1, Turret

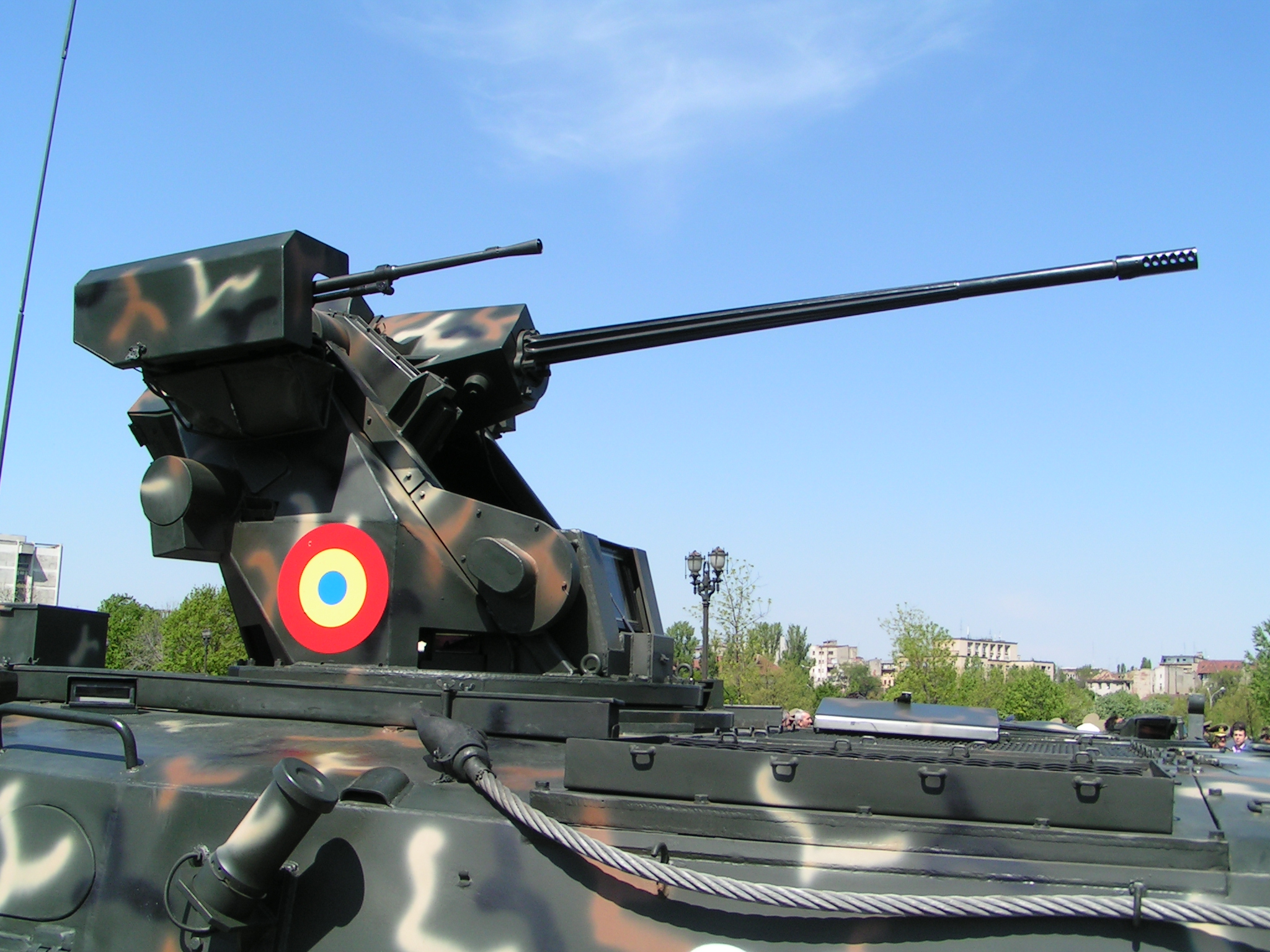
MLI-84M1, Turret, 23 April 2007

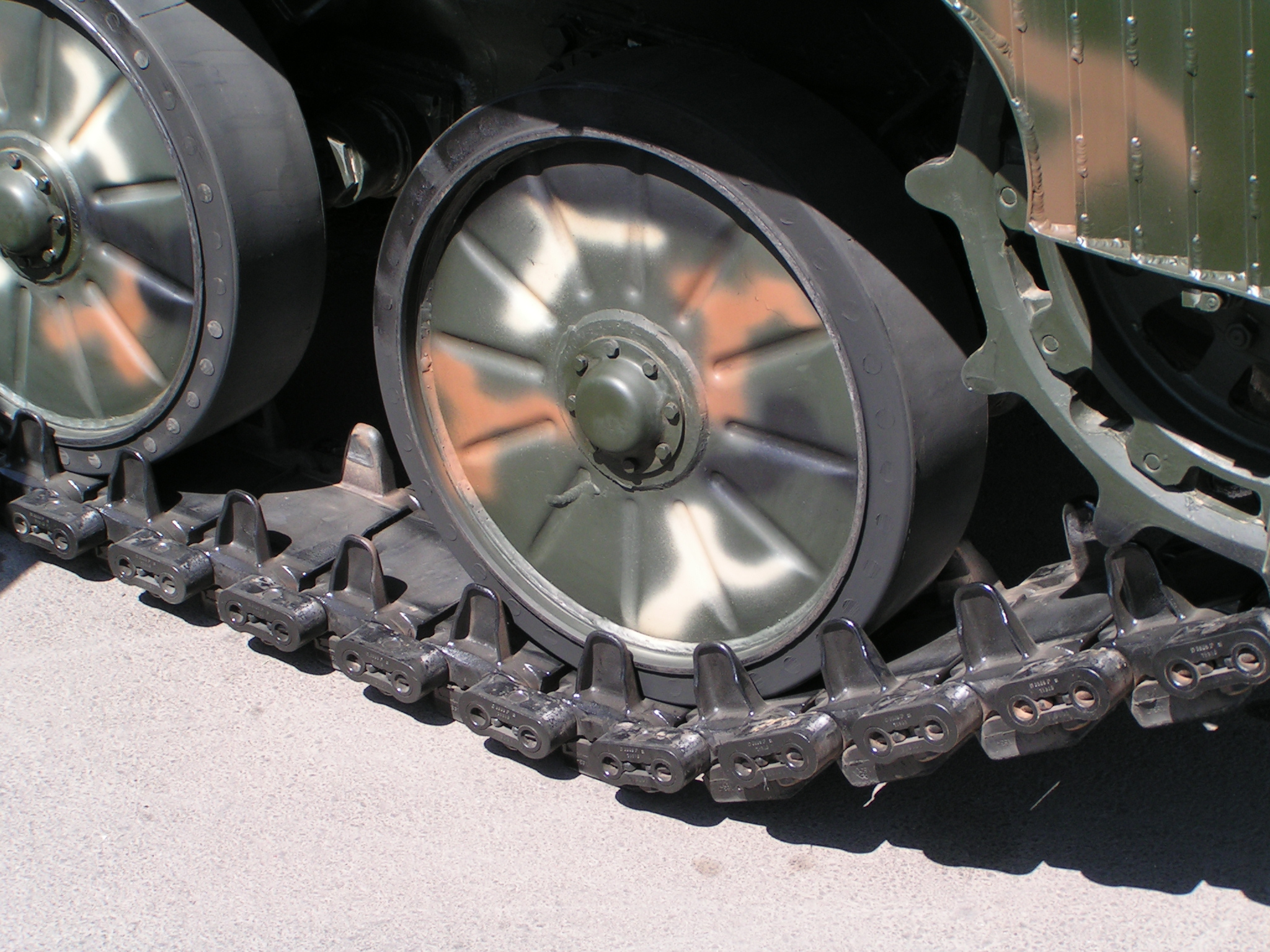
MLI-84M1, Tracks, 23 April 2007

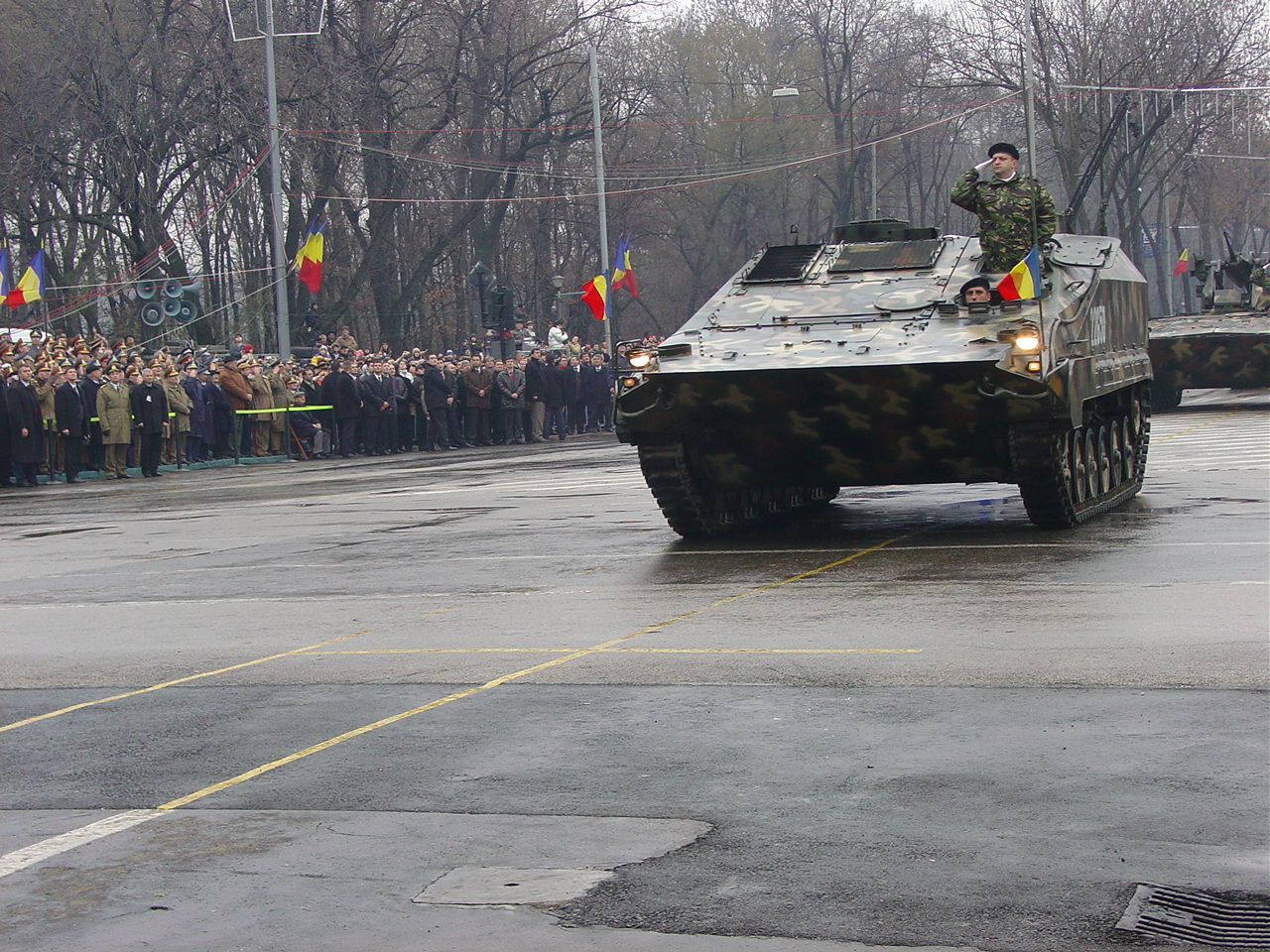
MLI-84M Command post

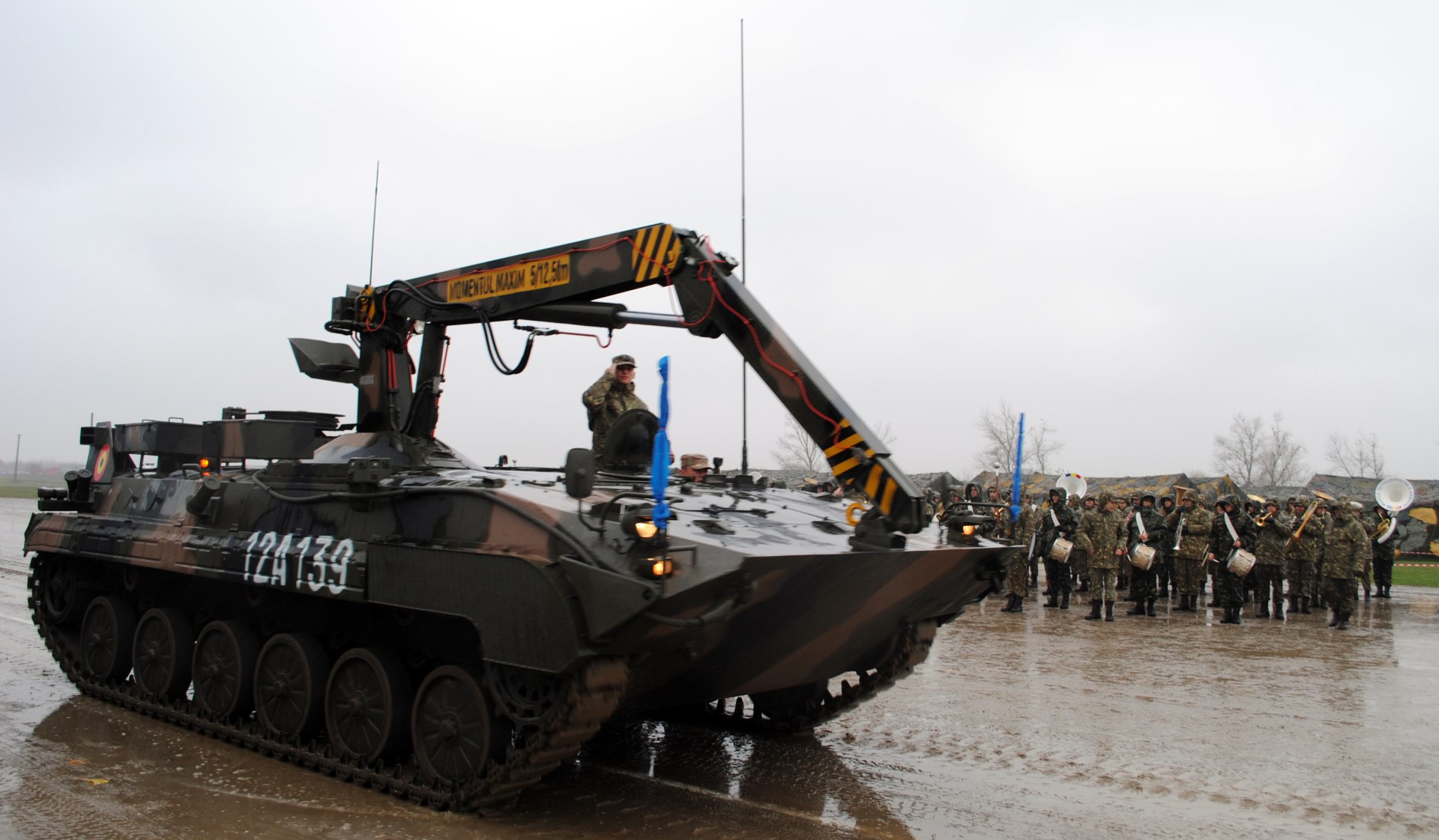
MLI-84M TEHEVAC (ARV)

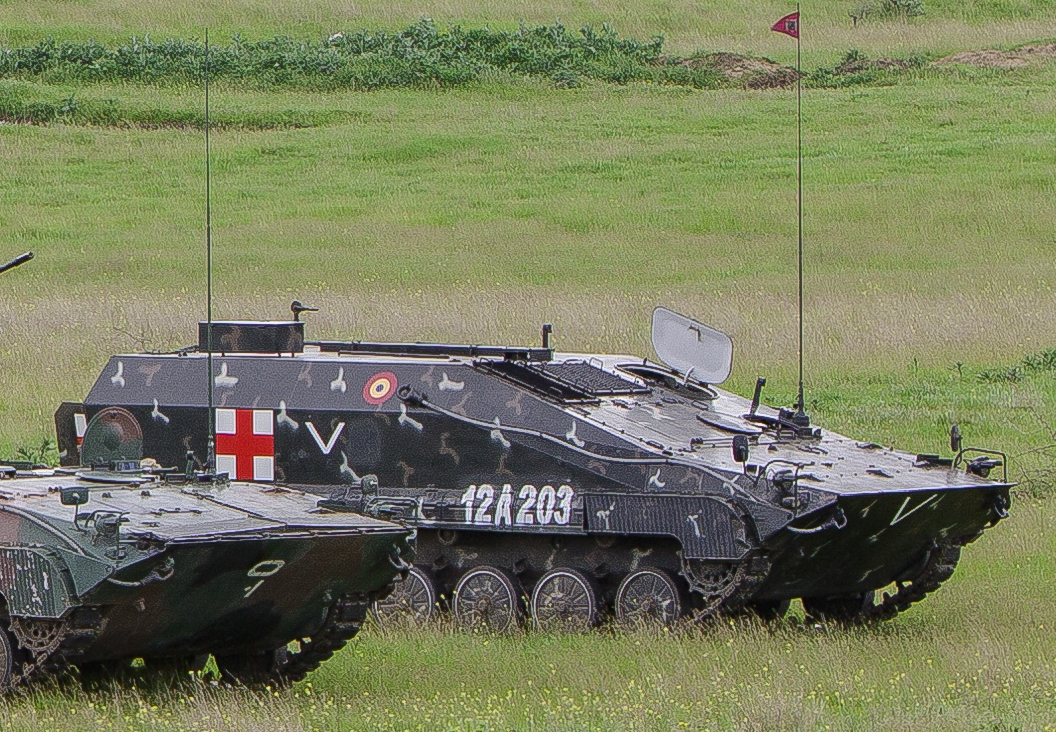
MLI-84M MEDEVAC
