= 282nd Armored Brigade =

282nd Armored Brigade "Unirea Principatelor"
- Brigada 282 Blindată "Unirea Principatelor"
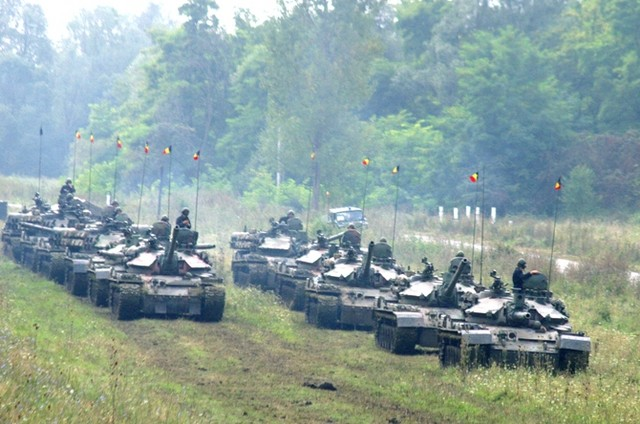
- A TR-85M1 company belonging to the 282nd Armored Brigade
- Active: 24 September 1968 – present
- Country: Romania
- Branch: Romanian Land Forces
- Size: 8 battalions
- Part of: 2nd Infantry Division
- Garrison/HQ: Focșani
- March: "March of the 282nd Armored Brigade"
- Anniversaries: 24 September

Commanders
- Current commander: Brigadier General Ștefan-Claudiu Topor

Insignia
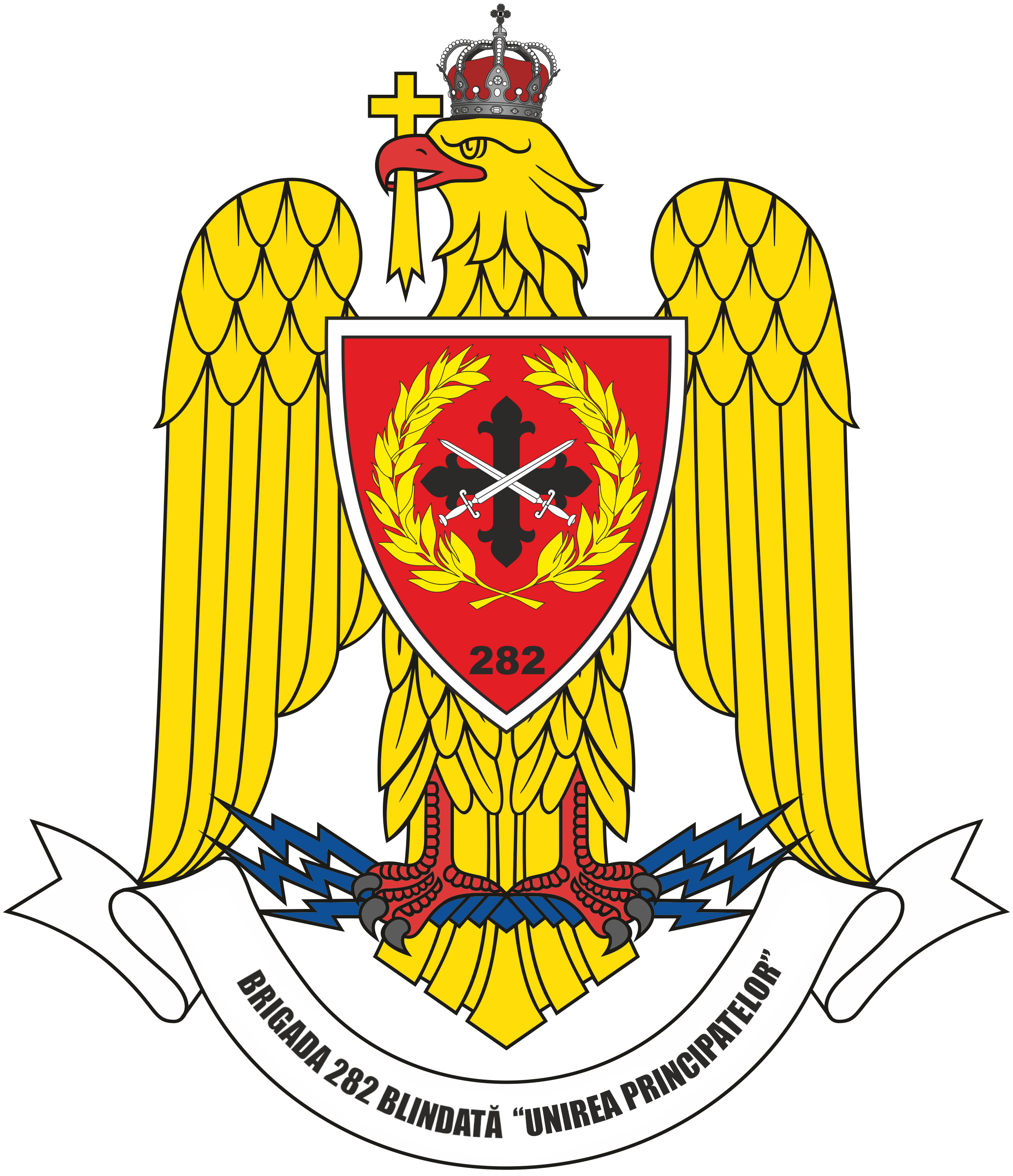
- Coat of Arms

The 282nd Armored Brigade "Unirea Principatelor" (Brigada 282 Blindată "Unirea Principatelor") is a Armored brigade of the Romanian Land Forces, originally formed as the 282nd Mechanized Regiment on 24 September 1968 and later designated as 282nd Mechanized Brigade "Unirea Principatelor".

In 1980 and again in 1988, the 282nd Mechanized Regiment at Focșani was listed as being part of the 67th Mechanised Division (Romania), a "Ready Division – Reduced Strength II," (roughly what previous Western systems knew as Category B). The regiment was transformed into the 282nd Mechanized Infantry Brigade, and then into the 282nd Armored Brigade in 2019.

The brigade is widely regarded as the best-trained unit of the Romanian Land Forces; it is subordinated to the 2nd Infantry Division. Its headquarters are still located in Focșani. The brigade operates the TR-85 main battle tank. Together with the subordinated units, the 282nd brigade has been deployed to peacekeeping missions in Angola, Kosovo, Afghanistan, and Iraq. The 282nd Armored Brigade was the first large unit of the Romanian army certified and confirmed for NATO operations.

== Organization ==
- 282nd Armored Brigade "Unirea Principatelor", in Focșani
  - Brigade HHC
  - 2nd Mechanized Infantry Battalion "Călugăreni", in Bucharest, with MLI-84M1 "Jderul" infantry fighting vehicles and Otokar Cobra II
  - 284th Tank Battalion "Cuza Vodă", in Galați, with TR-85M1 "Bizonul" main battle tanks (to be replaced by M1A2R Abrams main battle tanks in 2026)
  - 280th Mechanized Infantry Battalion "Căpitan Valter Mărăcineanu", in Focșani, with MLI-84M1 "Jderul" infantry fighting vehicles
  - 300th Mechanized Infantry Battalion "Sfântul Andrei", in Galați, with MLI-84M1 "Jderul" infantry fighting vehicles
  - 285th Field Artillery Battalion "Vlaicu Vodă", in Brăila, with Spike-LR mounted on URO VAMTAC; will be equipped with K9 Thunder self-propelled howitzers
  - 288th Anti-aircraft Defence Battalion "Milcov", in Focșani, with Flakpanzer Gepard and KP-SAM Chiron
  - 469th Logistic Support Battalion "Putna", in Focșani
  - 281st Support Battalion "General Arthur Văitoianu", in Focșani
    - 289th Reconnaissance Company, with Otokar Cobra II and PPE PGSR-3i "Beagle"
    - 290th Communications and Information Technology Company
    - 291st Support Company
    - 292nd CBRN Defence Company
    - 293rd Engineer Company
    - 294th Military Police Company

== International Missions ==
- Forces from the 282nd Mechanized Brigade were deployed in Kosovo between 2002 and 2003, and accomplished medevac, as well as other types of peacekeeping missions.
- 280th and 281st battalions were deployed since 2004 in Afghanistan as part of the ISAF and since 2006 in Iraq as part of the Operation Iraqi Freedom.
- 300th battalion was deployed in 2008 (January–July) as part of the ISAF in Afghanistan.
- 280th battalion was deployed in 2010 (Mai-November) as part of the ISAF in Afghanistan.
- BDE HQ along with 280th battalion and 300th battalion were deployed in 2012 as part of the ISAF in Afghanistan.

== Decorations ==
The 282nd Brigade has received the following decorations:

- National Order of Merit, Peacetime (Knight – 2022)
- Order of Military Virtue, Peacetime (Knight – 2009; Officer – 2017; Commander – 2023)
