= Pirooz (anti-tank missile carrier) =

Iranian anti-tank missile carrier

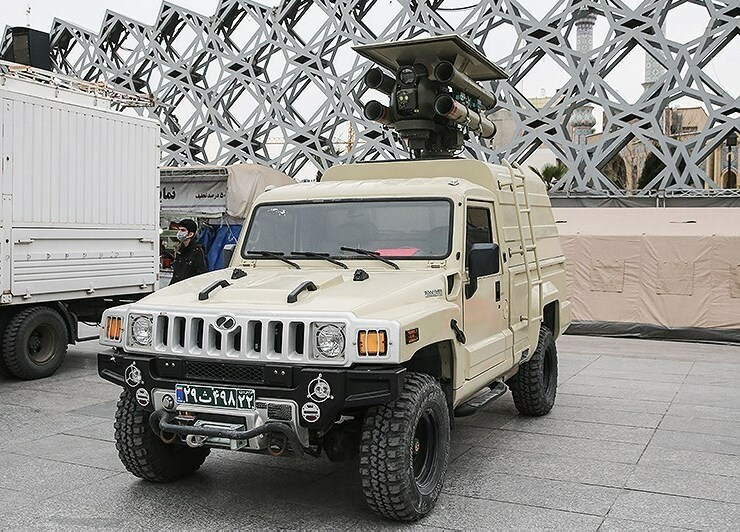
- The Pirooz on display during the 2022 Guardian of the Revolution exhibition
- Type: Anti-tank missile carrier
- Place of origin: Iran

Service history
- In service: 2021-present
- Used by: Iran: Islamic Revolutionary Guard Corps Ground Forces

Specifications
- Length: 5.3 meters
- Width: 2.1 meters
- Height: 2.2 meters (not counting the launcher)
- Crew: 2
- Main armament: 2 × or 4 × Dehlavieh anti-tank guided missile
- Engine: 133 hp
- Maximum speed: 135 km/h
- Steering system: hydraulic-assist power steering

The Pirooz (Persian: پیروز; "Victorious") is an Iranian anti-tank missile carrier vehicle based on the Aras tactical vehicle platform. It employs Dehlavieh, an Iranian derivative of the Russian 9M133 Kornet anti-tank guided missiles.

== Overview ==
The Pirooz appears to resemble Russia's Kornet-D, an anti-tank missile carrier currently in service with the Russian military. In particular the quadruple launcher of similar design with the 9M133M Kornet-M.

The Pirooz was first unveiled at the IQDEX Iraq Defense Exhibition in 2017. After period of testing, the Pirooz officially entered service with the Iran's Islamic Revolutionary Guard Corps Ground Forces in 2021.

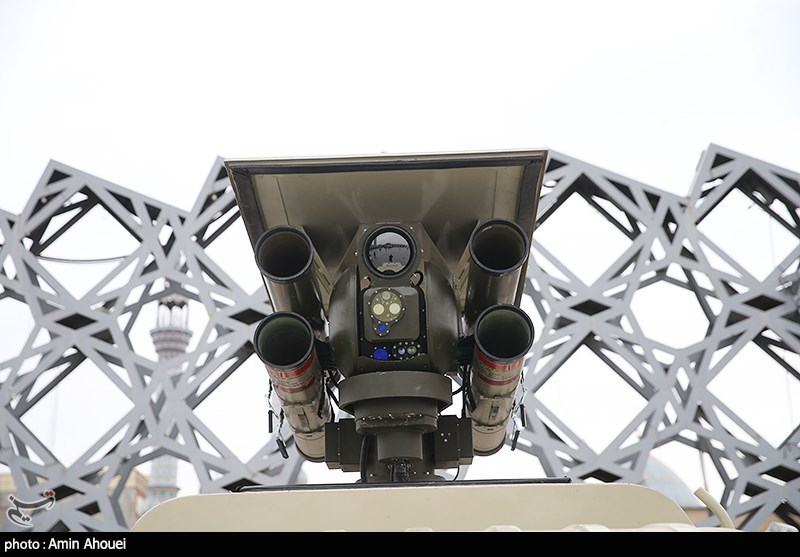
Close-up view of the Pirooz's missile launcher.

The Pirooz system consists of four missile launchers mounted on a remote controlled weapon station that can be lowered into a roadside position inside the vehicle. The Pirooz can launch the Dehlavieh missile, which is a copy of the Russian Kornet 9M113 ATGM (Anti-Tank Guided Missile).

An automatic electro-optical tracking system with a laser range finder and observation systems was installed in the center of the tower, with thermal and night vision capability. The control surface of the launcher is located in the frontal cab separate from the missile platform to provide additional safety to the operator.

The Pirooz is capable of engaging ground targets with a maximum range of 8,000 m, but can also be used against air targets with a maximum range of 1,800 m. The launcher are capable of defeat vehicles equipped with an active protection system through salvo fire at one target with 0.4 second delay.

The vehicle has a crew of two, and all shooting operations can be performed from inside the vehicle. The weapon platform is intended to be easily integrated with various types of armored and tactical vehicles. Though in Iranian service, it is specifically designed for the Aras tactical vehicle.
