= Semi-automatic command to line of sight =

Missile guidance method

Semi-automatic command to line of sight (SACLOS) is a method of missile command guidance. In SACLOS, the operator must continually point a sighting device at the target while the missile is in flight. Electronics in the sighting device and/or the missile, then guide it to the target.

== Overview ==
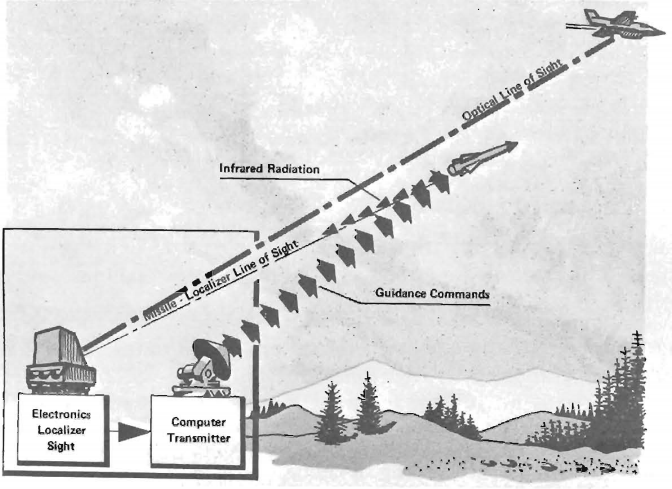
Roland 1, a radio-guided Semi-Active Command-to-Line-Of-Sight (SACLOS) air defense system. The graphic shows how the gunner optics tracks both the target and the missile position, while a transmitter sends the steering instructions to the missile via a radio link.

Many SACLOS weapons are based on an infrared seeker aligned with the operator's gunsight or sighting telescope. The seeker tracks the missile, either the hot exhaust from its rocket motor or flares attached to the missile airframe, and measures the angle between the missile and the centerline of the operator's sights. This signal is sent to the missile, often using thin metal wires or a radio link, which causes it to steer back toward the center of the line-of-sight. Common examples of these weapons include the BGM-71 TOW wire-guided anti-tank guided missile (ATGM) and the Rapier radio-command surface-to-air missile (SAM).

Another class of SACLOS weapons is based on the beam riding principle. In this case, a signal is sent from the operator's sights toward the target. The signal is generally radio or a laser. The missile has receivers for the signal on the rear of the fuselage. Some form of encoding is used in the signal so that the missile can steer itself into the center of the beam. Changing frequencies or dot patterns are also commonly used. These systems have the advantage that the link between the launcher and missile cannot easily be broken or jammed. But they have a disadvantage because the guidance signal may be detected by the target. Examples include the laser-guided RBS 70 SAM and 9M120 Svir ATGM.

The SACLOS differs from both semi-active radar homing (SARH) and semi-active laser homing (SALH) in which the target is illuminated by a powerful emitter, and a sensor in the head of the missile detects the reflected emissions, which then directs the missile to the target. The SACLOS systems do not illuminate the target with radar or laser.

This was also one of the main advantages over SALH systems regarding detection: the target is not being illuminated. Wire and radio-guided SACLOS missiles rely on the shooter's correction, while the laser riding-beam emitter is typically a low-powered device and does not need to be pointed immediately at the target. Because the missile sensor looks backward to it, the whole system is also impervious to most jamming devices. Another advantage in antitank applications is that the backward-looking guidance system does not interfere with the jet formation of high-explosive anti-tank (HEAT) charges at the warhead, thus maximizing the weapon's penetration.

However, such systems do not allow for a top-attack mode, or target illumination from a different source than the launcher itself, so the choice between the SACLOS and semi-active homing methods may vary between operators.

The main disadvantage of both SACLOS guidance systems in an anti-tank role is that working on angular differences evaluation, it does not allow any notable separation between guidance system and missile launch post the opposite of manual command to line of sight (MCLOS) ones, thus allowing updated version of such anti-tank weapons (notably AT-3 Malyutka) to still remain in service in some countries.

== Wire and radio-guided SACLOS ==
With wire- and radio-guided SACLOS, the sighting device can calculate the angular difference in direction from the missile position to the target location. It can then give electronic instructions to the missile that correct its flight path so it is flying along a straight line from the sighting device to the target. Most anti-tank SACLOS systems, such as Milan and TOW, use a strobe or flare (visible, infrared (IR) or ultraviolet (UV) light) in the tail of the missile with an appropriate sensor on the firing post, to track the missile's flight path. The launching station incorporates a tracking camera with two lenses. A wide field of view lens that locates and "gathers" the missile near the center of the gunners line of sight immediately after launch, and a narrow view lens with automatic zoom that accomplishes the fine tracking adjustments. In most configurations, the narrow field camera utilizes electronics that translate the brightest spot in the view – the flare or strobe of the missile – into an electrical impulse. This impulse changes as the missile leaves the center of the field of view, and the electronics automatically apply a correction instruction in the opposite direction of the change to re-center the missile.

These instructions are delivered either by a radio link or a wire. Radio links have the disadvantage of being jammable, whereas wire links have the disadvantages of being limited to the length of the wire and fragile (i.e. not very good for penetrating/attacking targets in vegetated areas such as forests) and can not be fired over bodies of water due to potential shorting of the wires. Also, wires leave a trace all the way to the target, which could help find the source of the fire. Note that almost all (unless counter-countermeasures are installed) wire/radio link guided ATGMs can be jammed with electro-optical interference emitters such as "Shtora-1" on the T-90a.

Examples
Wire-guided: HOT, MILAN, Swingfire, AT-4 Spigot, AT-5 Spandrel, M47 Dragon, AT-7 Saxhorn, BGM-71 TOW, Bumbar, HJ-8
Radio-guided: ASM-N-2 Bat, 9K33 'Osa' (SA-8 'Gecko'), Javelin surface to air missile, BGM-71 TOW (Wireless (RF) variants), HJ-9A (mmW-Radar command)

== Beam-riding SACLOS ==
With beam-riding SACLOS, the sighting device emits a directional signal directed toward the target. A detector in the tail of the missile looks for the signal. Electronics in the missile then keep it centered in the beam.

Radar was the most common form of SACLOS signals in early beam-riding systems, because, in the anti-aircraft role, the target is typically already being illuminated by a radar signal. Early systems used radar beams pointed directly at an aircraft. Because the missile stays inside the beam, it flies directly at the target instead of leading it. This makes it too slow to hit fast, maneuvering jets. For this reason, most anti-aircraft missiles follow their own route to intercept the target, and do not ride the beam. A more modern use of beam-riding uses laser signals because they are compact, less sensitive to distance, and are difficult to detect and jam.

Examples
9K121 Vikhr, 9K119 Refleks, 9M133 Kornet, MIM-146 ADATS, MSS-1.2, RBS-70, Shershen, Starstreak, ZT3 Ingwe

== Laser-guided SACLOS ==
With laser-guided SACLOS, it is functionally similar to the wire and radio-guided SACLOS, but instead, the flight path instructions are delivered by a laser beam to the receiver on the missile's rear, eliminating the wire, while being less susceptible to radio jamming.

It differs from the laser beam-riding, as the laser command guidance (laser-guided SACLOS) is relatively complex; the missile frame requires a flare and a laser receiver, while the ground station requires an optical seeker and a laser transmitter for flight path correction. Laser beam-riding is simpler; the missile only needs a laser receiver/detector at the tail, eliminating the need for a flare. The laser-based command guidance is essentially a laser-based replacement for the traditional wire- and radio-guided SACLOS, making it much cheaper to build than the laser beam-riding missiles.

Unlike the radio-guided SACLOS, laser beam-riding, or semi-active laser homing (SALH), the disadvantage of laser command guidance is that firing on the move requires a stabilized launcher, which means the launch platform is usually a purpose-built launch vehicle with a stabilized turret, leading to higher complexity.

Examples

- HJ-9

== See also ==
- Command guidance
- Manual command to line of sight (MCLOS)
- Semi-active radar homing
- Fire-and-forget
