= ZFB-05 =

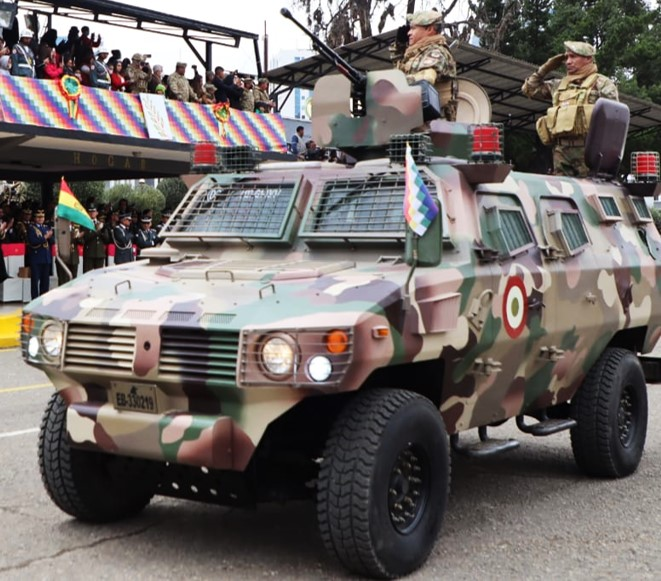
- ZFB-05 of the Bolivian Army
- Type: Infantry mobility vehicle
- Place of origin: China

Service history
- Wars: Russo-Ukrainian War

Production history
- Manufacturer: Shaanxi Baoji Special Vehicles Co., LTD

Specifications
- Mass: 4500kg
- Length: 5.275m
- Width: 2.54m
- Height: 2.26m
- Crew: 2
- Passengers: 7-9
- Main armament: 12.7 mm heavy machine gun or 7.62 mm machine gun
- Engine: SOFIM 8142.43 or SOFIM 8142.45 diesel engine 117 or 127hp
- Payload capacity: 1100kg
- Fuel capacity: 124L
- Operational range: 800km
- Maximum speed: 100km/h

The ZFB-05 Xinxing (Chinese: 新星; pinyin: Xīnxīng; lit. 'new star') is a Chinese infantry mobility vehicle developed mainly for the People's Liberation Army Ground Force, the People's Armed Police, police forces, Chinese UN peacekeepers, and the export market.

It is a simple and low-cost vehicle. The ZFB-05 has a steel armored hull, making it marginally effective against small arms fire and artillery shrapnel.

== History ==
The ZFB-05 is designed and manufactured by the Shaanxi Baoji Special Vehicles Co., Ltd, a private vehicle company established in 1983 as the Baoji Special Vehicles Factory, then privatized in 2007. Historically, most Chinese military equipment were produced by state-owned enterprises, but due to the strategy of Military-Civil Fusion, many private and civilian enterprises entered the military market, producing weaponry and equipment for the People's Liberation Army.

== Design ==
The vehicle is based on the chassis of the Nanjing NJ2046 light utility vehicle, which is a licensed copy of the Iveco 40.10WM. It features a fully armored hull which is, according to the official website, effective against 7.62*39mm standard ammunition fired from a Type 81 light machine gun in close range. Additional applique armor is also available, as well as an optional NBC protection system. However, an incident in which Chinese peacekeepers in a ZFB-05 were attacked in Haiti demonstrated that the vehicle is not resistant to armor-piercing bullets and therefore not suitable to high-intensity combat environments.

The main armament of the ZFB-05 is a 12.7mm heavy machine gun mounted in a turret on the roof of the vehicle, with a shield to provide frontal protection to the gunner. Some vehicles are observed with other armaments such as a 7.62mm machine gun, a 23mm autocannon, or a 35mm automatic grenade launcher. The vehicle is powered by a SOFIM 8142.43 4-cylinder turbocharged diesel engine, which produces an output of 117hp; another available engine is the SOFIM 8142.45, which produces approximately 127hp.

== Variants ==
=== ZFB-05A ===
A more advanced version of the ZFB-05 with slightly improved frontal protection (frontal armor can withstand Type 53 7.62*39mm armor piercing ammunition), also featuring a higher maximum speed of 115km/h.

=== ZFB-05C Armored ambulance ===
The ZFB-05C is the medical variant of the ZFB-05, with improved armor allowing protection from 7.62*39mm steel-core ammunition in all directions. The ZFB-05C can transport 3 sitting patients or 1 lying down, with the ZFB-05C-1 is a slightly larger vehicle with the capacity of 5 sitting patients or 2 lying down.

=== ZFB-05 Broadcasting vehicle ===
The broadcasting vehicle is a ZFB-05 with two loudspeakers along with a variety of other broadcasting equipment on a rotational mount in place of the weapon station.

=== ZFB-05 Riot control vehicle ===
This is a baseline ZFB-05 equipped with two water cannons.

=== ZFB-05 Police vehicle ===
The ZFB-05 police variant is used by Chinese police forces.

=== ZFB-08 ===
The ZFB-08 is a 6x6 version of the ZFB-05 with more focus on protection from mines and under-body blasts.

=== TD-2000 Short range surface-to-air missile system ===
The TD-2000 short-range surface-to-air missile system (contains 8 QW-4 missiles) can be mounted on the ZFB-05 along with a variety of other light utility vehicles such as the Dongfeng Mengshi.

== Users ==
- Benin : 2 delivered in 2010
- Bolivia : 41 delivered in 2016 and 2018
- Chad : 10 delivered in 2007
- China :People's Liberation Army Ground Forces, People's Armed Police and People's Police 100 in service in 2008
- Congo : 5 delivered from 2006 to 2009
- Gabon : 3 delivered in 2006
- Myanmar : 10 delivered in 2011
- Niger : 5 delivered in 2009
- Russia As of 23 September 2024, the Russian military has started using ZFB-05 armoured vehicles in Ukraine.
- Rwanda : 20 delivered in 2008
- Somalia: Provided by African Union.

== See also ==
- M1117
