= NJ2045/2046 =

Chinese military truck

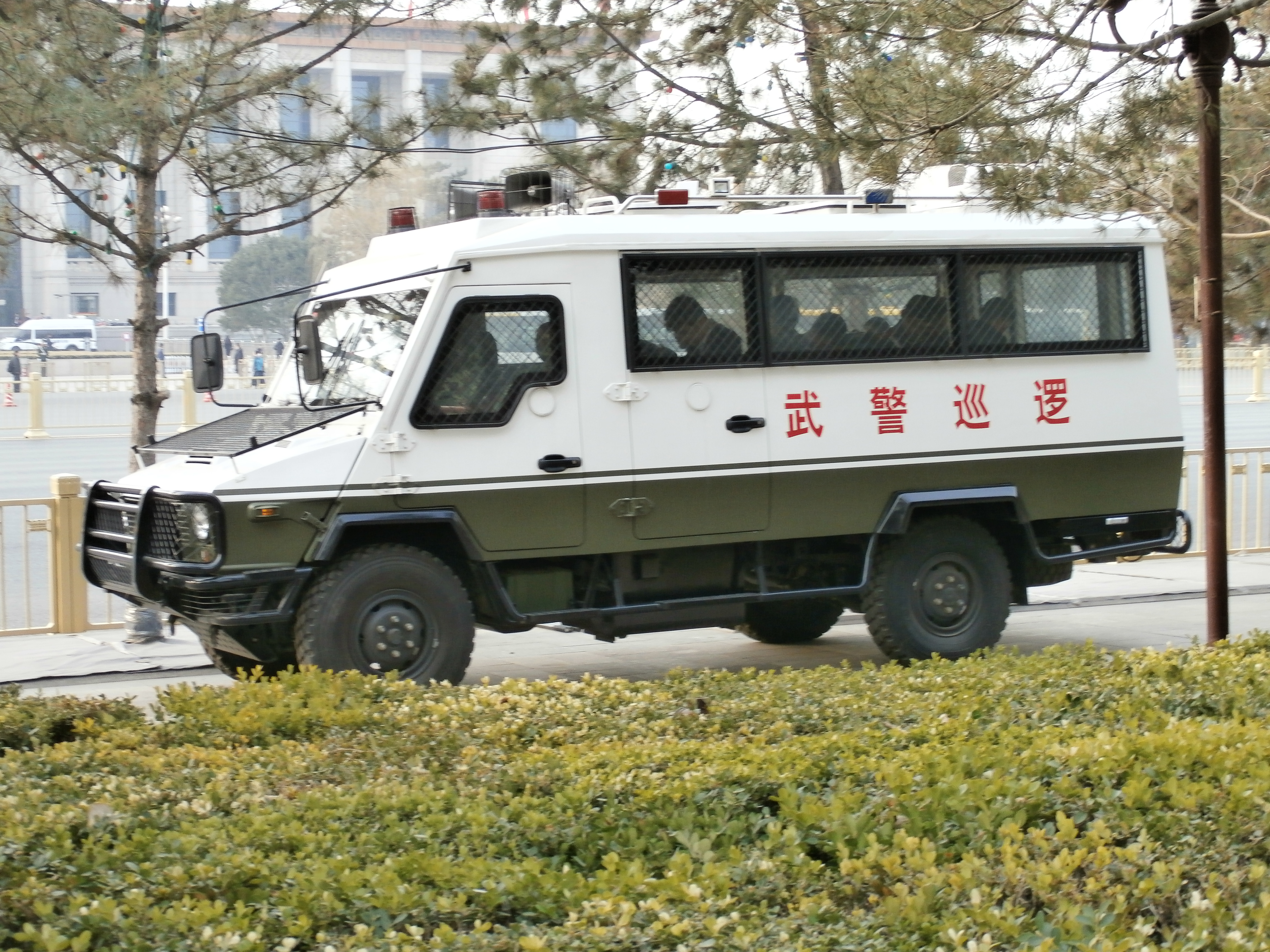
Nanjing NJ2046 armed police patrol van in Beijing

The Nanjing NJ2045 and NJ2046 are a series of high mobility trucks deployed by the Chinese Army, capable of transporting 1.5 tonne of cargo cross-country. It is a licensed version of the Iveco 40.10WM 4X4 off-road military truck, built by Nanjing Motor Corporation.

The truck entered service in the PLA after 1999.

== Weapon platform ==
- 4X4 high-mobility truck
- HJ-9A anti-tank guided missile carrier
- riot control vehicle
- troop carrier

== Variants ==
- 10-man (3+3+2X2)
- 11-men (3+4X2)

== Armored vehicles ==
- ZFB-05 Xinxing armored personnel carrier
- ZFB-08, a 6x6 variant of the ZFB-05

== Operators ==
- China used by People's Liberation Army, People's Armed Police and Guiyang PSB SWAT
- Mongolia Seen on the State Flag Day parade in 2022
- Pakistan used by Pakistan Army
- Sri Lanka used by Sri Lanka Army Commando Regiment
- Dominica used by Dominica Police Force
