= HJ-9 =

Hong Jian (Red Arrow) - 9
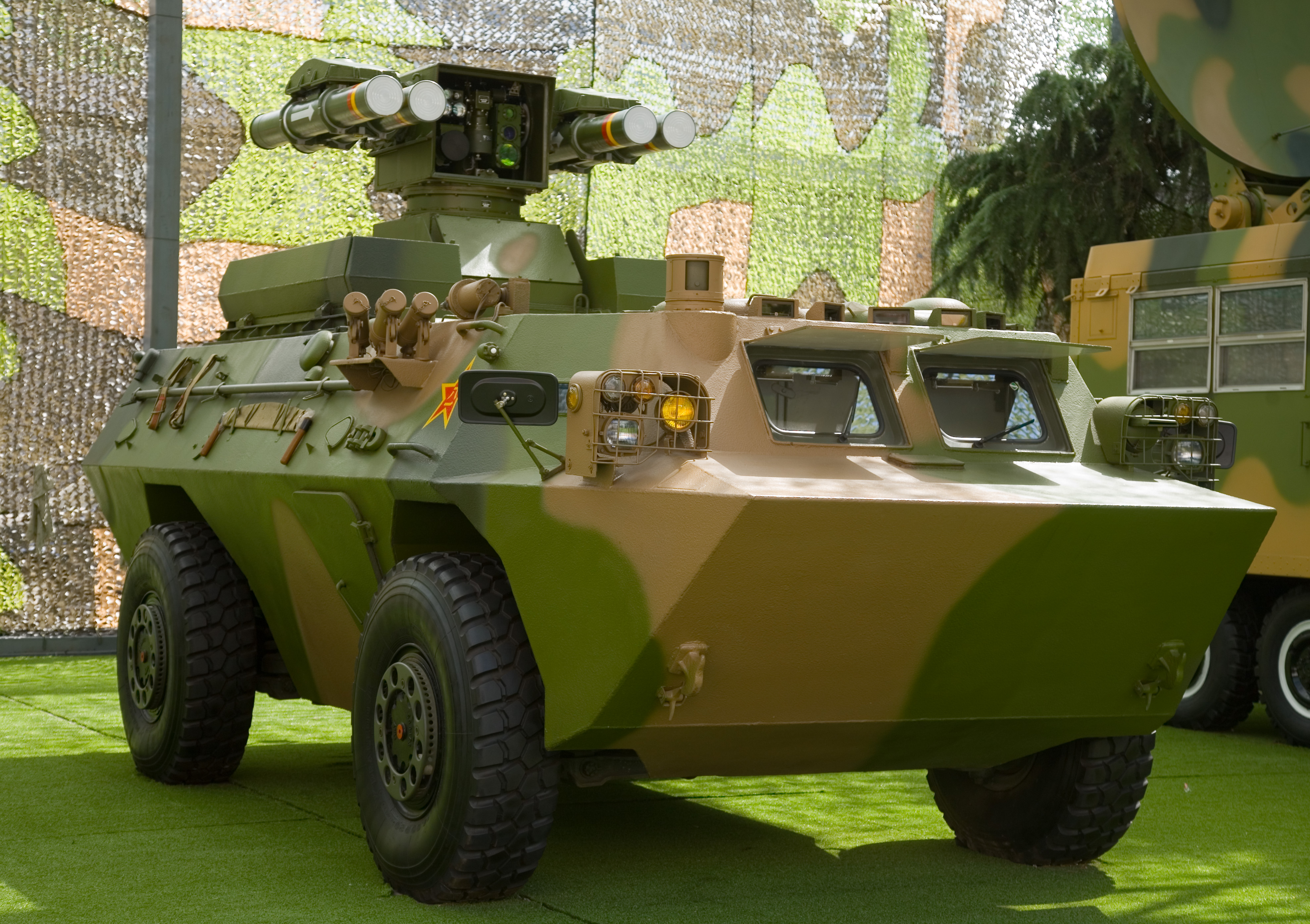
- A HJ-9 missile system mounted on a WZ550 4x4 vehicle.
- Type: Anti-tank and air-to-surface missile
- Place of origin: China

Service history
- In service: 1990s–present

Production history
- Manufacturer: Norinco
- Produced: 1990s–present

Specifications
- Mass: 37 kg (82 lb)
- Length: 1,200 mm (47 in)
- Diameter: 152 mm (6.0 in)
- Effective firing range: 100–5,500 m (330–18,040 ft)
- Maximum firing range: 5,500 m (18,000 ft)
- Warhead: Tandem-charge HEAT warhead, 110–120 cm (3.6–3.9 ft) penetration RHAe
- Detonation mechanism: Contact fuze
- Engine: Rocket engine
- Propellant: Solid fuel
- Guidance system: HJ-9: Laser command guidance (laser-SACLOS); HJ-9A: millimeter wave radar command guidance HJ-9B: Laser beam-riding
- Launch platform: Tripod; WZ-550; NJ2046; Light utility vehicles; Helicopters

The HJ-9, HongJian-9 (Chinese: 红箭-9; pinyin: Hóng Jiàn-9; lit. 'Red Arrow-9'), military designation AFT-9, is an advanced, third-generation, man-portable or vehicle-mounted anti-tank guided missile system deployed by the People's Liberation Army Ground Force.

== History and development ==
The HJ-9 missile was developed by China North Industries Corporation (Norinco), and one of the chief designers was Yang Chunming (杨春铭). It is externally similar in appearance to the Israeli Man Portable Anti-Tank System (MAPATS) and South African ZT3 Ingwe anti-tank missile, however, no evidence was found of any technological link.

HJ-9 development began in the early 1980s and finished in the late 1990s. It was unveiled to the public in a military parade in 1999.

The HJ-9 was showcased internationally at the Defence Services Asia exhibition held in Malaysia in 2000, and at IDEX 2001. A version focusing on the export customer, called HJ-9A, was developed in 2002. The HJ-9A was certified in 2003. In 2005, Norinco revealed the HJ-9A in various public events. Unlike HJ-9, the HJ-9A used semi-active millimeter wave radar command guidance. The HJ-9A launcher was mostly observed being mounted on a tripod with an integrated radar system and was demonstrated by Norinco on a NJ2046 utility vehicle. The HJ-9A can also be mounted on trucks, armored personnel carriers, and other light utility vehicles.

The HJ-9A was further developed into HJ-9B, featuring laser beam-riding guidance.

== Design ==
The HJ-9 missile system consists of the HJ-9 missile itself, the missile launch tube, a command station (including optical and infrared sights and a laser transmitter), and auxiliary equipment for system diagnosis. The missile itself is divided into several major components, including a two-stage solid rocket motor (launch and cruise stages), a tandem-charge warhead, a flight control compartment, folding wings, and tailfins that deploy in flight. The cruise-stage motor is located in the middle of the missile body and features four vector control nozzles.

Claimed penetration of rolled homogeneous armour (RHAe) is 120 cm (3.9 ft), which is greater than the HJ-8. The missile can mount various warheads, including a tandem-charge high-explosive anti-tank (HEAT) shaped charge, high explosive (HE), or thermal, for use against non-armored point targets, bunkers, and fortifications. Like the HJ-8, the HJ-9 uses a disposable container and launching tube, but the one for HJ-9 is heavier, weighing 37 kg (82 lb) due to HJ-9's large diameter of 152 mm (6.0 in). The missile is compatible with various thermal imaging sights and can be mounted on an AFT-9 Missile Carrier.

The HJ-9 has a maximum range of 5.5 km (3.4 mi), and a minimum range of 100 m (110 yd), guided by laser-based semi-automatic command to line of sight (SACLOS) guidance. With laser-guided SACLOS, it is functionally similar to the wire and radio-guided SACLOS, but instead, the flight path instructions are delivered by an encoded laser beam to the receiver on the missile's rear, eliminating the wire, while being immune to radio jamming. It differs from the laser beam-riding. The laser command guidance (laser-guided SACLOS) missile requires a flare and a laser receiver, while the ground station requires an optical seeker and a laser transmitter for flight path correction. Laser beam-riding is simpler; the missile only needs a laser receiver/detector at the tail, eliminating the need for a flare. The laser-based command guidance is essentially a laser-based replacement for the traditional wire- and radio-guided SACLOS, making it much cheaper to build than the laser beam-riding missiles.

Unlike the laser beam-riding or semi-active laser homing (SALH) missiles, the disadvantage of laser command guidance is that firing on the move requires a stabilized launcher, which means the launch platform is usually a purpose-built launch vehicle. This resulted in the HJ-9 only being deployed on WZ-550 vehicles or helicopters with a stabilized turret.

The HJ-9A replaces the laser transmitter with the millimeter wave radar command guidance, and the system's weight is lower than that of HJ-9, allowing the HJ-9A to be fitted on light trucks and assault vehicles. It is functionally similar to the TOW 2A RF (Radio Frequency) missile. Radar-based command guidance also makes the fire-on-the-move function cheaper to implement on lighter platforms The HJ-9B variant features laser beam-riding guidance.

== Variants ==
HJ-9
Original variant with laser command guidance (laser-SACLOS), optical/IR tracking, laser-encoded command transmission, and digital signal control.
HJ-9A
Variant with millimeter wave radar command guidance (radar-SACLOS).
HJ-9B
Variant with laser beam-riding guidance.

== Operators ==
- China
  - People's Liberation Army Ground Force: 450 AFT-9 Missile Carrier estimated in service as of 2020.
- Rwanda
  - Rwanda Defence Force: HJ-9A mounted on the Otokar Cobra armored vehicles.
- Morocco
  - Royal Moroccan Armed Forces: HJ-9A

== See also ==
- Anti-tank guided missile

Related development

- HJ-8 – wire-guided anti-tank missile system
- HJ-10 – fiber-optic wire-guided anti-tank missile system
- HJ-12 – man-portable infrared-homing anti-tank missile system

Missiles of comparable design

- MAPATS – (Israel)
- ZT3 Ingwe – (South Africa)
- 9M133 Kornet – (Russia)
