= ZT3 Ingwe =

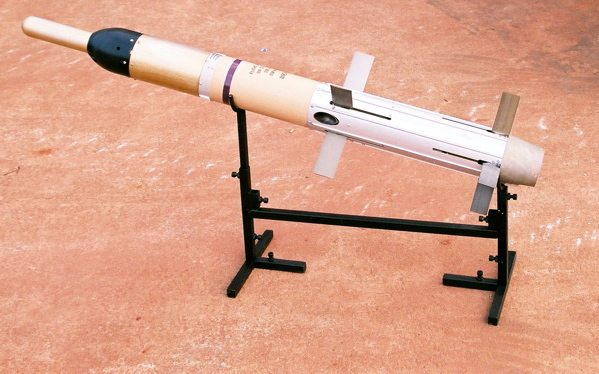
- An Ingwe with control fins extended
- Type: Anti-tank guided missile
- Place of origin: South Africa

Service history
- In service: 1987–present
- Used by: See Users
- Wars: South African Border War

Production history
- Designer: Denel Dynamics
- Designed: 1980s
- Manufacturer: Denel Dynamics
- Produced: 1987–present
- Variants: ZT3, ZT3A2

Specifications
- Mass: 28.5 kilograms (63 lb)
- Length: 1,750 millimetres (69 in)
- Diameter: 127 millimetres (5.0 in)
- Warhead: Tandem-charge HEAT warhead, multi-purpose penetrator (MPP) warhead
- Detonation mechanism: Impact
- Operational range: 250 m – 5,000 metres (3.1 mi)
- Maximum speed: 0.200 kilometres per second (450 mph)
- Guidance system: Laser beam riding

The ZT3 Ingwe (Leopard) is a modern South African multi-role laser beam riding anti-tank guided missile (ATGM) manufactured by Denel Dynamics (formerly Kentron).

== Design and development ==
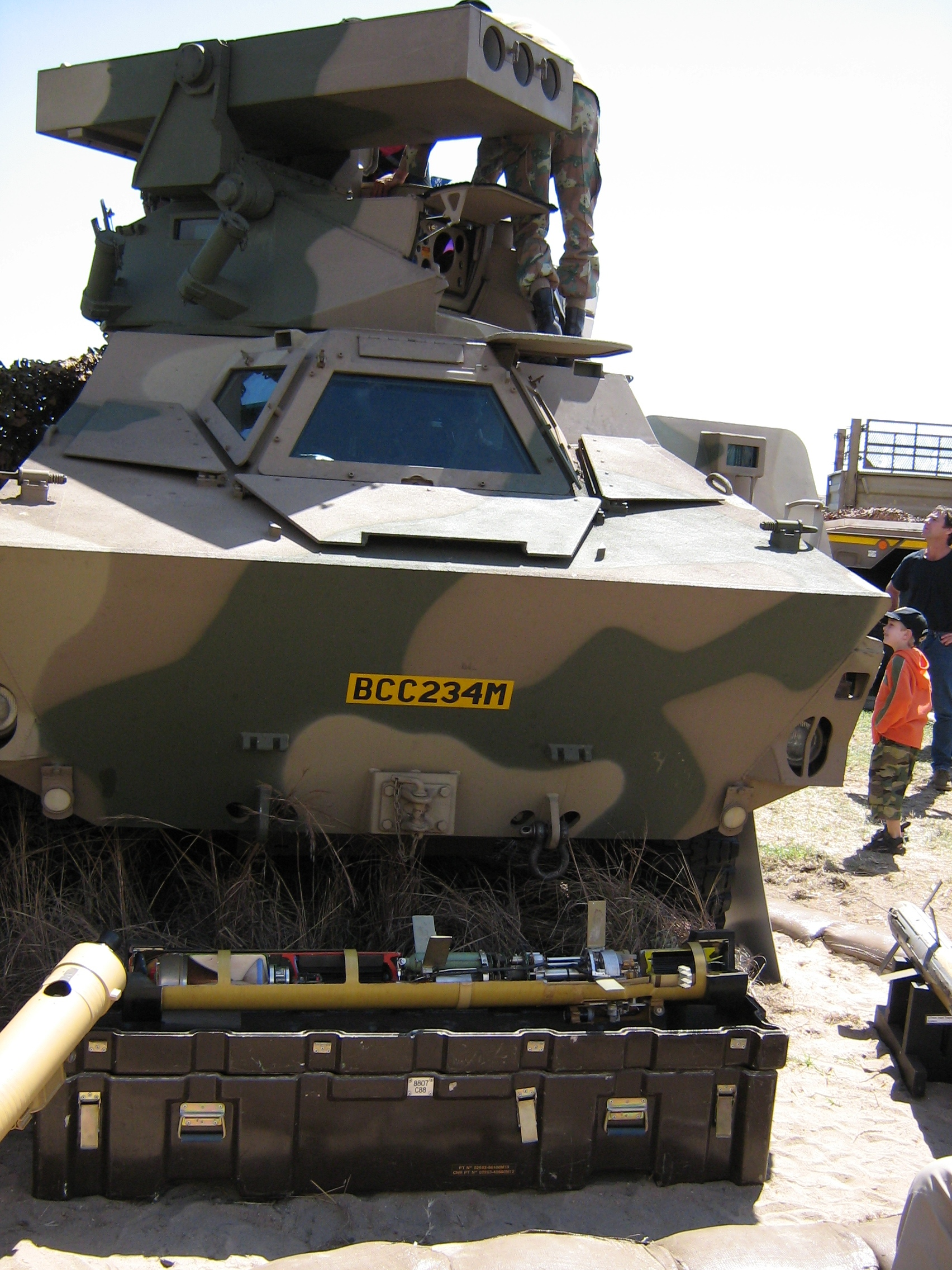
Ratel IFV with Ingwe launcher on top and missile in front on ground.

The ZT3 and its launch system were developed under the codename "Project Raleigh" in the 1980s as a "long-range indigenous antitank guided missile". The missile was developed to provide the South African Army's mechanized infantry vehicles, such as the Ratel IFV, with anti-tank abilities and to supplement the ageing MILAN missile system that was in service at the time. Preproduction models, mounted in a triple launcher on top of a Ratel IFV, saw service in Operation Moduler during the South African Border War with good effect.

In the years since, Denel Dynamics have continually upgraded the system to improve its range, accuracy, reliability and warhead effectiveness. In May 2010, Denel Dynamics and Rheinmetall Denel Munitions were working on a new series of multi-purpose warheads for the missile system. Denel stated that due to changing trends in warfare in recent years, customers required a "generic precision land-attack missile" that can be used against a variety of targets such as buildings and bunkers.

Denel is also developing the missile system for use on the Badger Infantry Fighting Vehicle that will enter service with the South African Army as part of Project Hoefyster. The company has also collaborated with the French-South African company, ATE, to integrate the missile system for use on helicopter platforms such as the Eurocopter EC635, the Mi-24 SuperHind Mk III and Eurocopter Fennec for use in various Air Forces around the world. Several missile systems in use with the South African Army were also modernised in 2005 as part of Project Adrift.

In February 2013, Denel unveiled a new version of the system at the International Defence Exhibition held in Abu Dhabi. The new system, called the Portable Launch System (IPLS), is a portable, light-weight launch system that comprises a new missile launch unit designed for use on light vehicle mounts or tripods. It can fire both high-explosive anti-tank (HEAT) and multi-purpose penetrator (MPP) versions of the Ingwe.

The system consists of a laser projection unit and guidance and control units. The system uses a laser beam riding missile that automatically determines its own position in the laser beam and manoeuvres onto its line of sight (LOS). The sighting system varies from a non-stabilised optic system for light vehicles to a stabilised day/night system on helicopter launch systems. Automatic target recognition and targeting modules can also be added to the missile system to ensure fully automatic post-lock on missile guidance by an operator. The missile can engage targets at ranges from 250–5,000 metres (820–16,400 ft). It employs a tandem-charge warhead to defeat up to 1,000 millimetres (39 in) of armour. The missile is also designed to be highly resistant to countermeasures, and uses stealth technology to be harder to detect.

As of 2009, the ZT-3 was estimated to cost about $39,900.

== Launch platforms ==
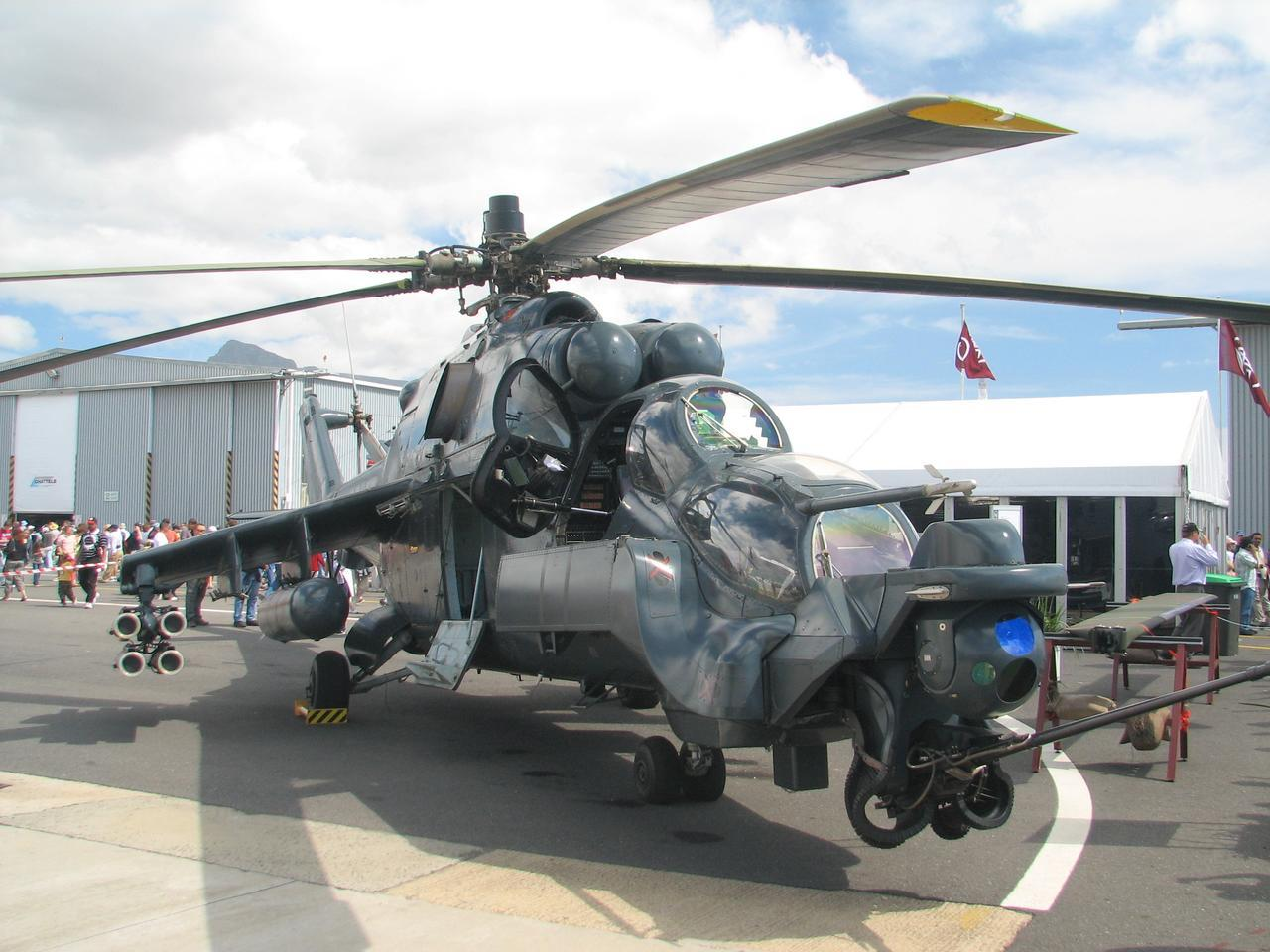
Mi-24 SuperHind with Ingwe Missiles.

Denel states that the Ingwe missile can be integrated on a wide variety of launch platforms, from infantry-crewed stationary launchers to helicopter-based launchers. The missile is known to be integrated for use on these platforms:

- Ratel Infantry Fighting Vehicle
- AV8 Gempita armoured fighting vehicle
- Mi-24 SuperHind Mk III
- Eurocopter EC635
- Eurocopter Fennec
- Badger Infantry Fighting Vehicle
- Denel Rooivalk

== Operators ==
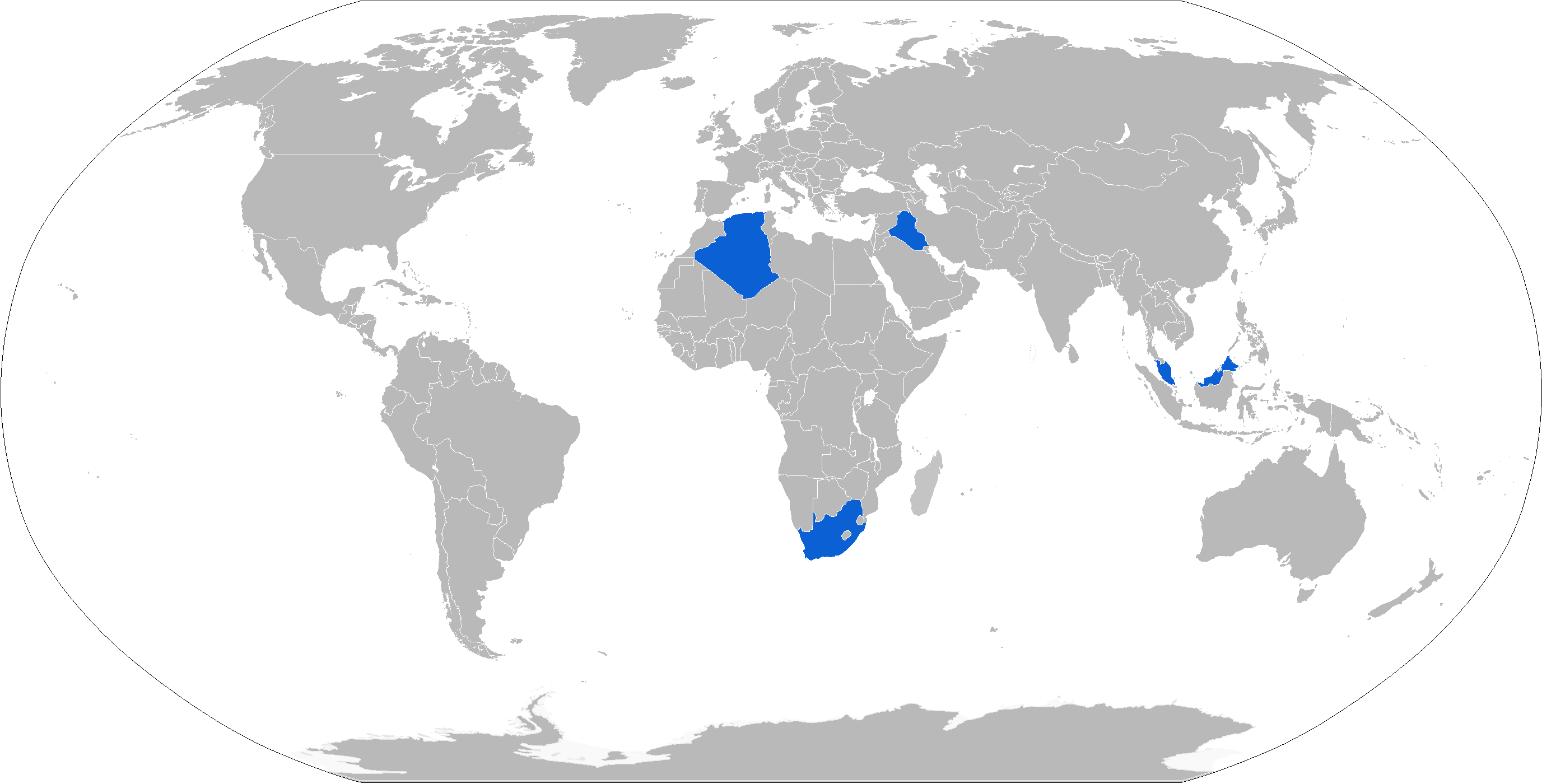
Map with ZT3 operators in blue

=== Current operators ===
- Algeria
  - Algerian Air Force – 700 delivered between 2000 and 2001 for Mi-24 SuperHind MkIII helicopters.
- Iraq
  - Iraqi Air Force – 300 delivered between 2010 and 2012 for Eurocopter EC635 helicopters.
- Malaysia
  - Malaysian Army – 216 missiles ordered and 54 missile turrets for use on the AV8 Gempita armoured combat vehicles.
- South Africa
  - South African Army – used on the Ratel IFV and will be integrated onto the Badger Infantry Fighting Vehicle.

== Operational history ==
The weapon was first used on 10 September 1987 when a pre-production Ratel ZT3 destroyed several T-55 tanks at the Lomba River in Angola.

== See also ==
Missiles of comparable design

- BGM-71 TOW – (United States)
- MAPATS – (Israel)
- HJ-9 – (China)

Missiles of comparable role

- Euromissile HOT – (West Germany)
- 9M133 Kornet – (Russia)
- MILAN – (France, West Germany)
- 9M119 Svir – (Soviet Union)
