= Dehlavieh (missile) =

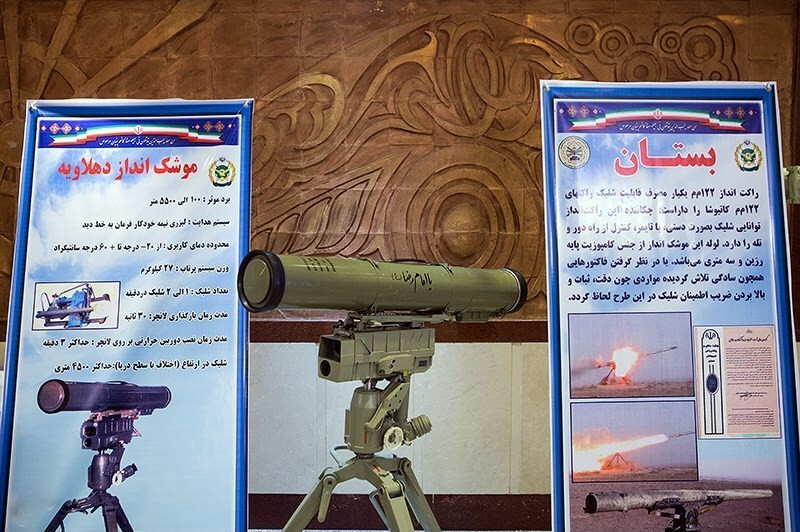
- The Dehlavieh missile launcher on display
- Type: Anti-tank guided missile
- Place of origin: Iran

Service history
- In service: 2012–present
- Used by: See Operators

Production history
- Designer: Ministry of Defence and Armed Forces Logistics
- Designed: Before July 2012
- Manufacturer: Ministry of Defence and Armed Forces Logistics
- Unit cost: Unknown
- Produced: 2012–present
- No. built: Unknown
- Variants: Dehlavieh-2 Dehlavieh-3

Specifications
- Operational range: 6–8 km
- Guidance system: Laser

The Dehlavieh (Persian: دهلاویه; also Dehlavie, Dehlaviyeh, etc.) is an Iranian anti-tank guided missile made by the Ministry of Defence and Armed Forces Logistics. It is considered to be an unlicensed copy of the Russian 9M133 Kornet, which has the same guidance, outer appearance and stated performance specifications.

== History ==
In March 2023, it was reported that several Dehlaviehs were confiscated by American and British troops from being transported to the Houthis. The incident took place in February 2023 after an American aircraft conducted surveillance on a small boat coming from Iran.

== Design ==
The Dehlavieh has a range of 5–6 km which was reportedly extended to 8 km (for both its air and ground launched versions) as of 2023. Its armor penetration is said to be more than 1,000 mm.

In 2018, it was reported that the Dehlavieh could have the “RU244TK” and “RU150TK” thermal imaging cameras attached.

== Operators ==
=== State operators ===
- Iran
- Libya: Used by Government of National Accord

=== Non-state actors ===
- Gaza Strip: Hamas (Izz ad-Din al-Qassam Brigades), Al-Quds Brigades aka Palestinian Islamic Jihad
- Iraq: Al Abbas Combat Division
- Lebanon: Hezbollah
- Yemen: Houthis
