= Iveco VM 90 =

Italian multirole military truck

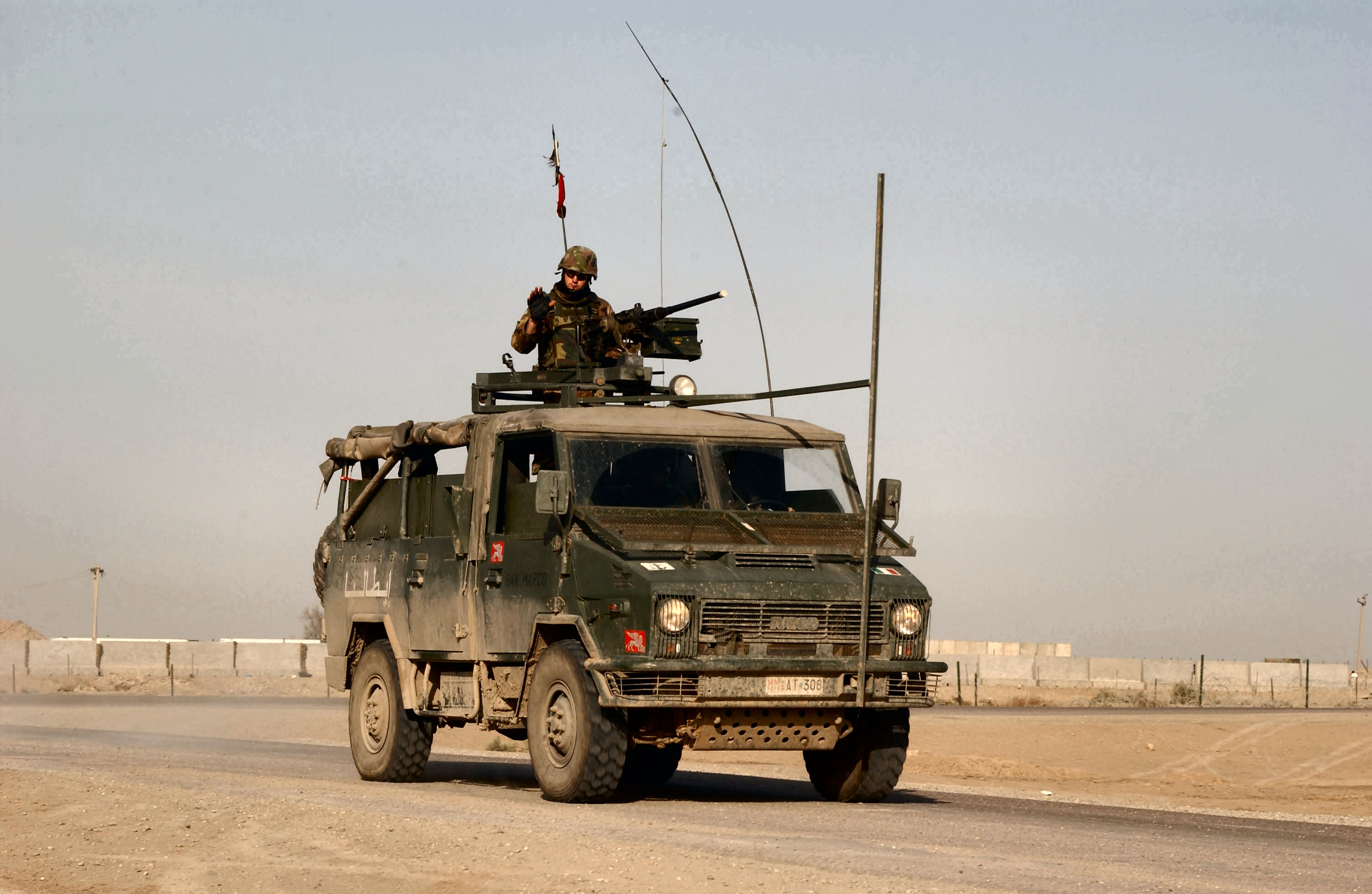
A VM 90T of the San Marco Regiment of the Marina Militare in Iraq, during Operation Antica Babilonia.

The Iveco VM 90 is an Italian multirole military vehicle. It is a hybrid, somewhere between a truck and tactical SUV, manufactured by Iveco, on the base of the Iveco Daily. From this version was subsequently also derived the 40.10WM civilian version, designed for law enforcement and civil protection.

It is in service in the Italian Army in three versions:

- VM 90T Torpedo, a tactical vehicle with a tarpaulin covered rear.
- VM 90P Protetto (Protected), fitted with a fully armored body.
- Ambulanza VM 90 (Ambulance VM 90), fitted with an ambulance body.

The Torpedo version is also supplied with ground forces of the Italian Navy and the Italian Air Force. The VM 90 is powered by a diesel engine.

== Versions ==
=== Torpedo ===
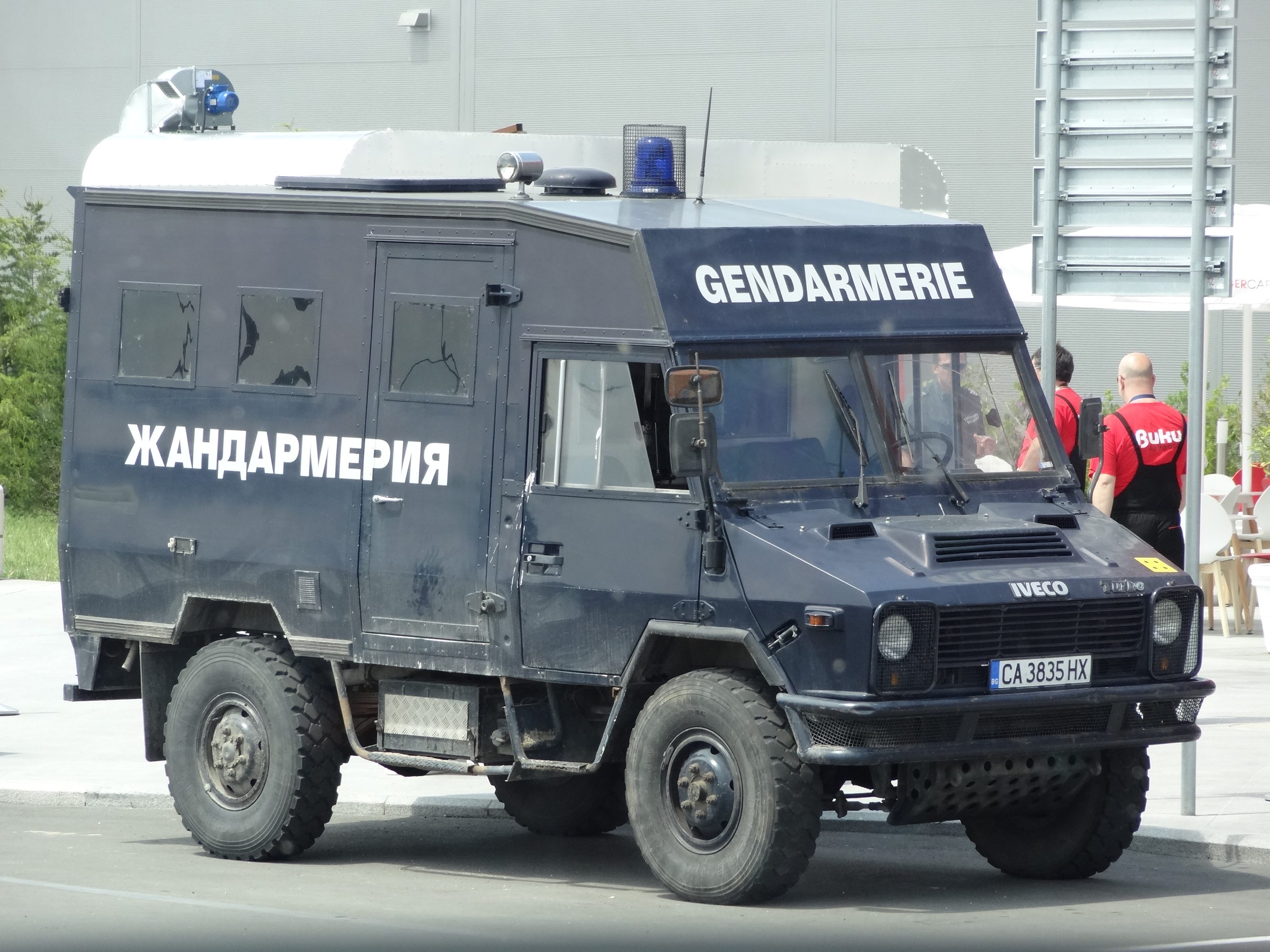
Bulgarian Gendarmerie VM90 APC

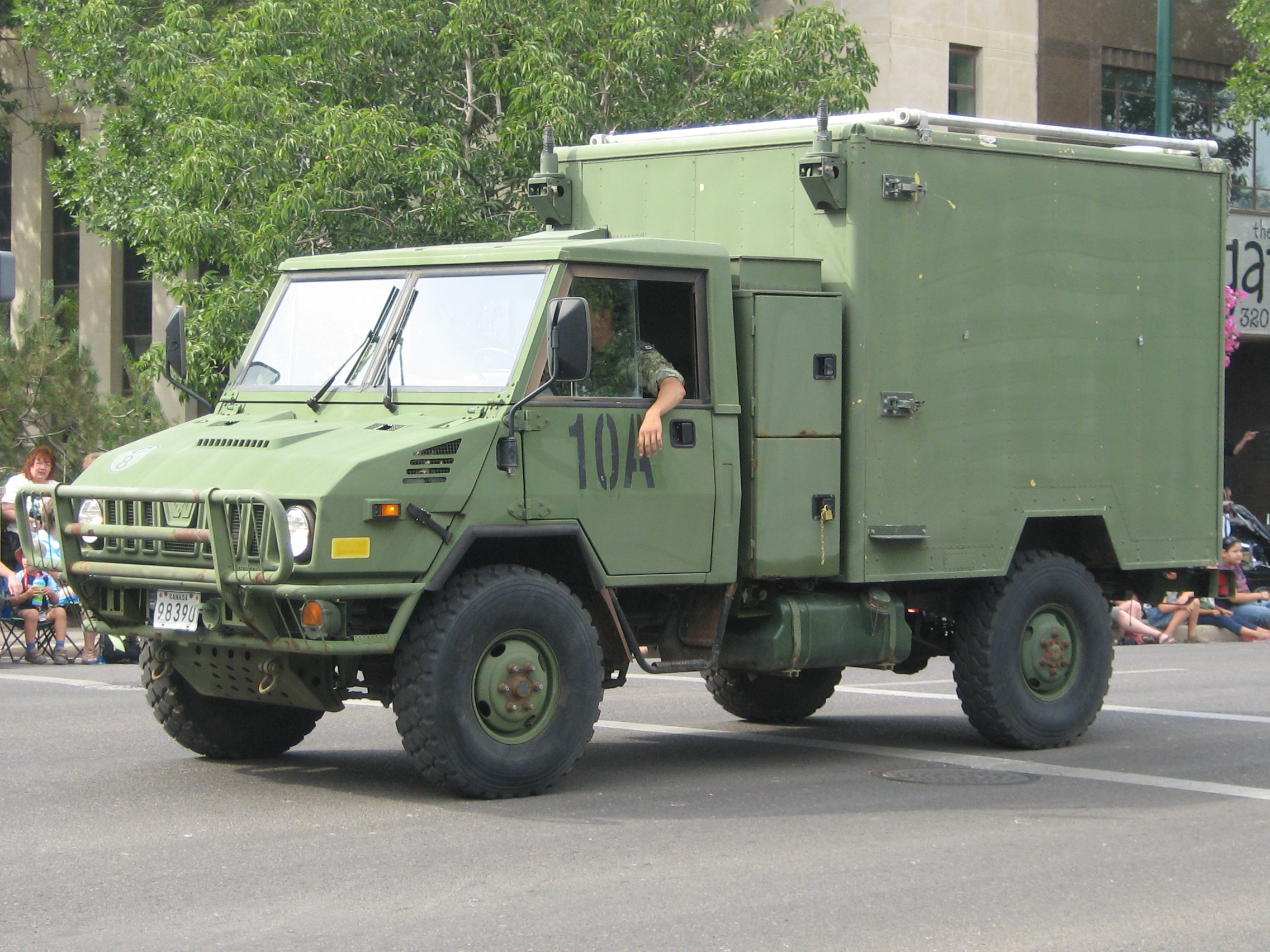
Canadian Armed Forces VM90 shelter carrier

The Torpedo version is the basic version, with rear tilt and capable of carrying 10 men, besides the driver. This version is suitable for transporting tactical troops, but does not have an armor, among other uses, there is the possibility of pulling small artillery pieces or serve as a tactical command post.

It is used by all departments of the Italian Army since the service was used in all missions outside the box.

Features

- Displacement: 2499cc
- Cylinders: 4
- Power: kW: 73.5, HP: 100 at 3,800 rpm
- Length: 4500 mm
- Width: 2000 mm
- Height: 2483 mm
- Transmission gears: 5 manual
- Strength: Full
- Speed: 102 km / h
- Positions: 1 + 8
- Range: 800 km

=== Protected ===
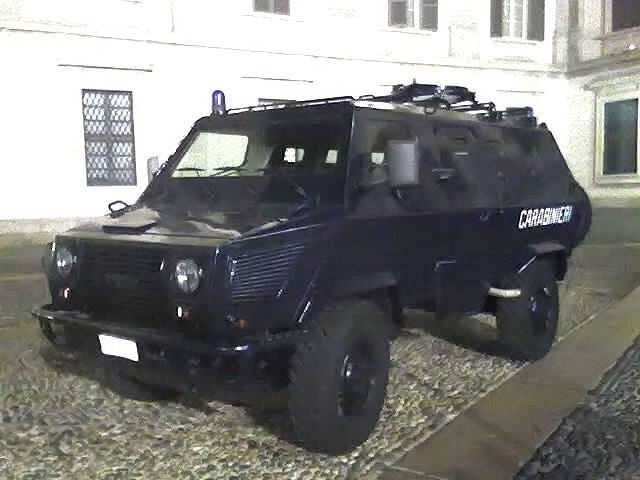
A VM 90P of the Carabinieri

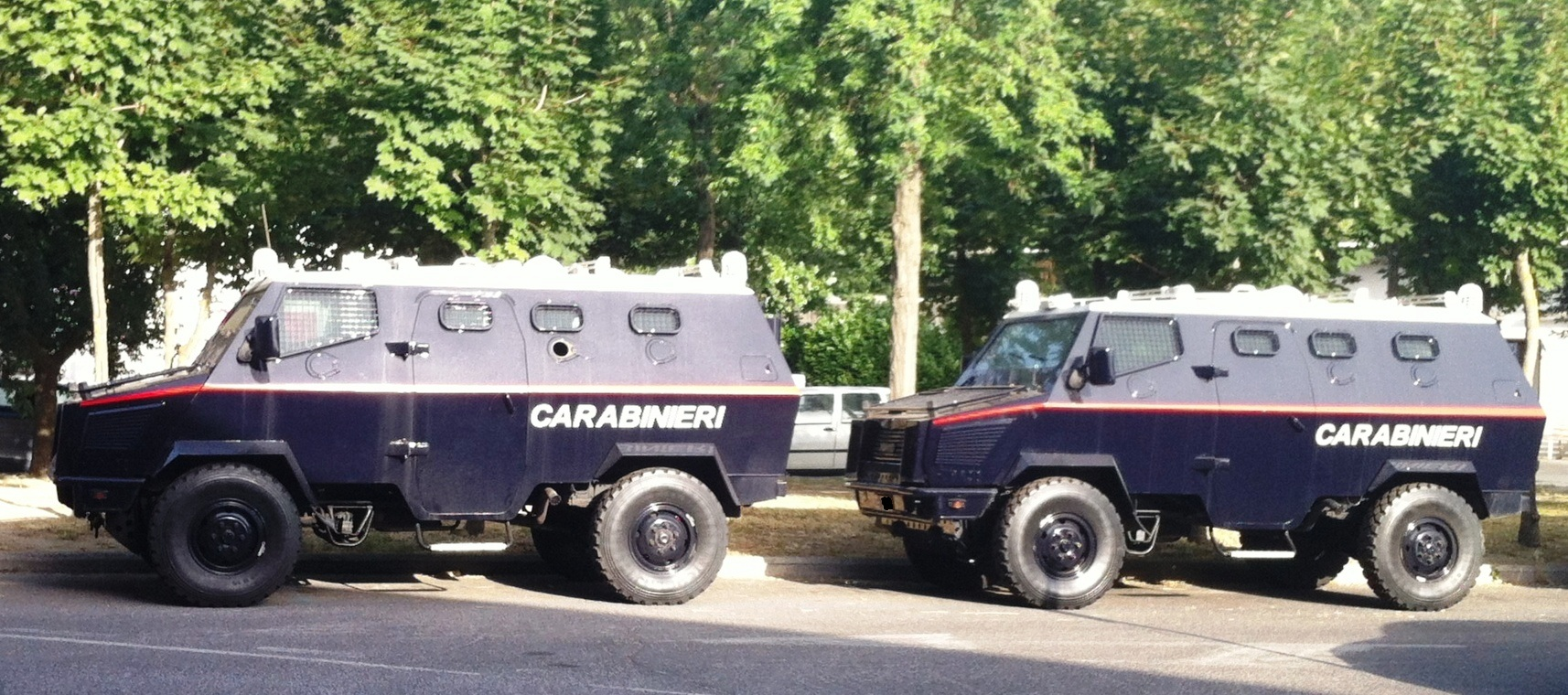
Two VM 90P of the Carabinieri with new colors layout (2012)

This variant is intended to deal with the need to ensure greater protection for personnel. The secure version has a full armour, with a cockpit that replaces the rear platform with tarpaulin version of Torpedo. The armoured cockpit is equipped with rear door windows and holes to use the arms without exposing himself, as well as trap-gun or other weapon.

The vehicle has been criticised for being unsafe for its crew, as the armour does not offer high protection, but was adopted into service anyway as a temporary solution pending the entry into service of the VBL Puma. The vehicle was employed in Somalia, during Operation Restore Hope, and in Iraq during Operation Antica Babilonia. Due to its evident lack of protection offered, the VM 90P has never been loved by Italian military personnel; because of a vague resemblance, Italian soldiers "lovingly" nicknamed it as the "scarrafone" (big ugly cockroach).

At that time the deadliest incident involving this kind of armoured vehicle took place: on 27 April 2006 in Nasiriya an IED exploded under a VM90P with 5 servicemen on board. Three of them were killed instantly due to thermal shock and the other two were critically burned and died thereafter.

Features

- Displacement: 2499 cm 3
- Cylinders: 4
- Power: kW: 75.7 (HP: 103) at 3800 rpm
- Length: 4680 mm
- Width: 1980 mm
- Height: 2380 mm
- Transmission gears: 5 speed manual
- Strength: Full
- Positions: 1 + 6
- Range: 800 km.

=== Ambulance ===
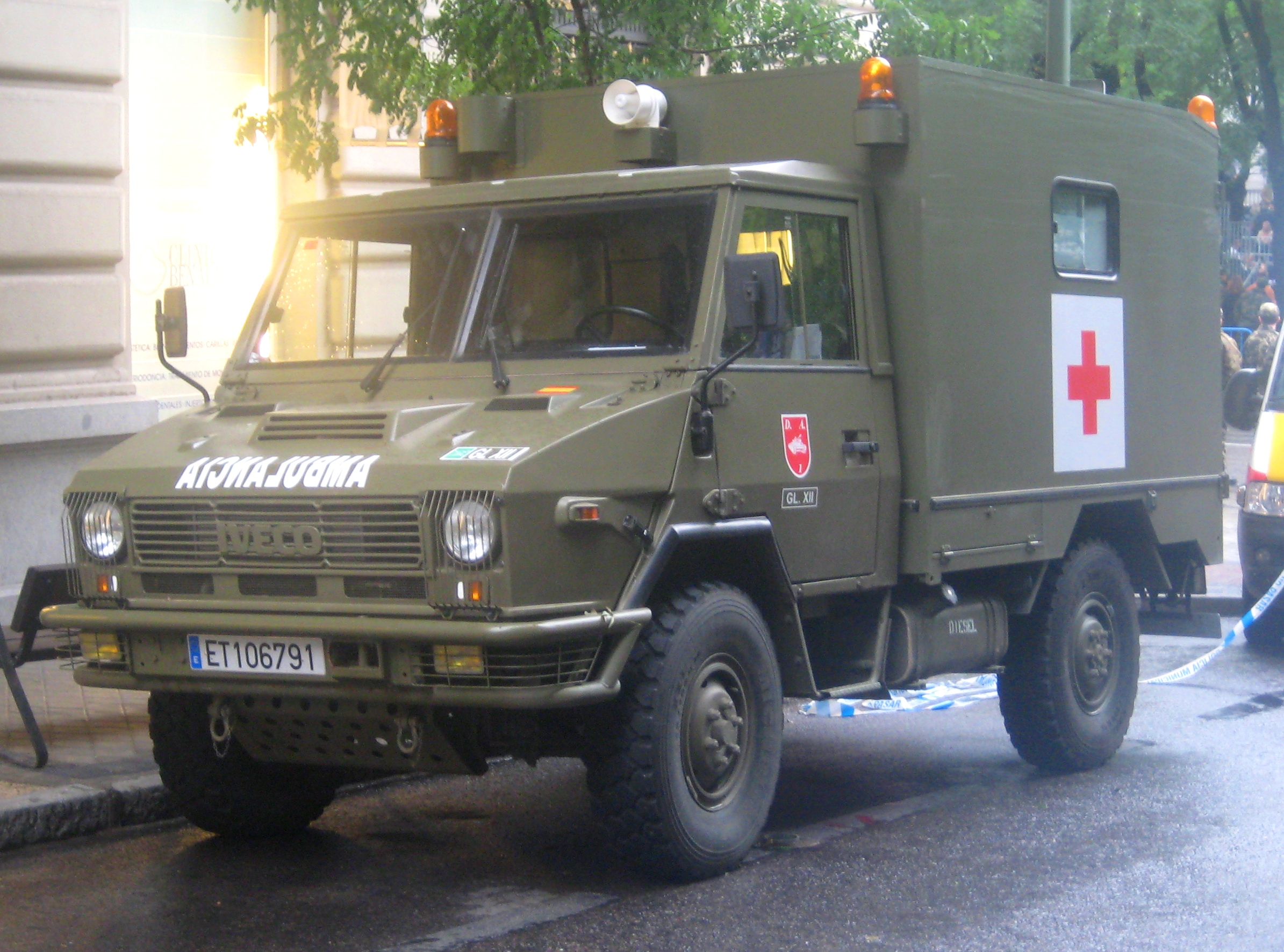
Iveco-Pegaso 40.10WM of the Spanish Army

The ambulance version of the VM 90 is a variant of the Torpedo suited to carry injured off-road and tactical level, which will join the ambulance version of the Fiat Ducato, also supplied all Italian Army.

Features

- Displacement: 2499 cm 3
- Cylinders: 4
- Power: kW: 75.7 (HP: 103) at 3800 rpm
- Length: 4880 mm
- Width: 2040 mm
- Height: 2200 mm
- Transmission gears: 5 manual
- Strength: Full
- Top speed: 110 km / h
- Positions: 3 front, 1 rear, 2 stretchers
- Range: 800 km.

== Operators ==
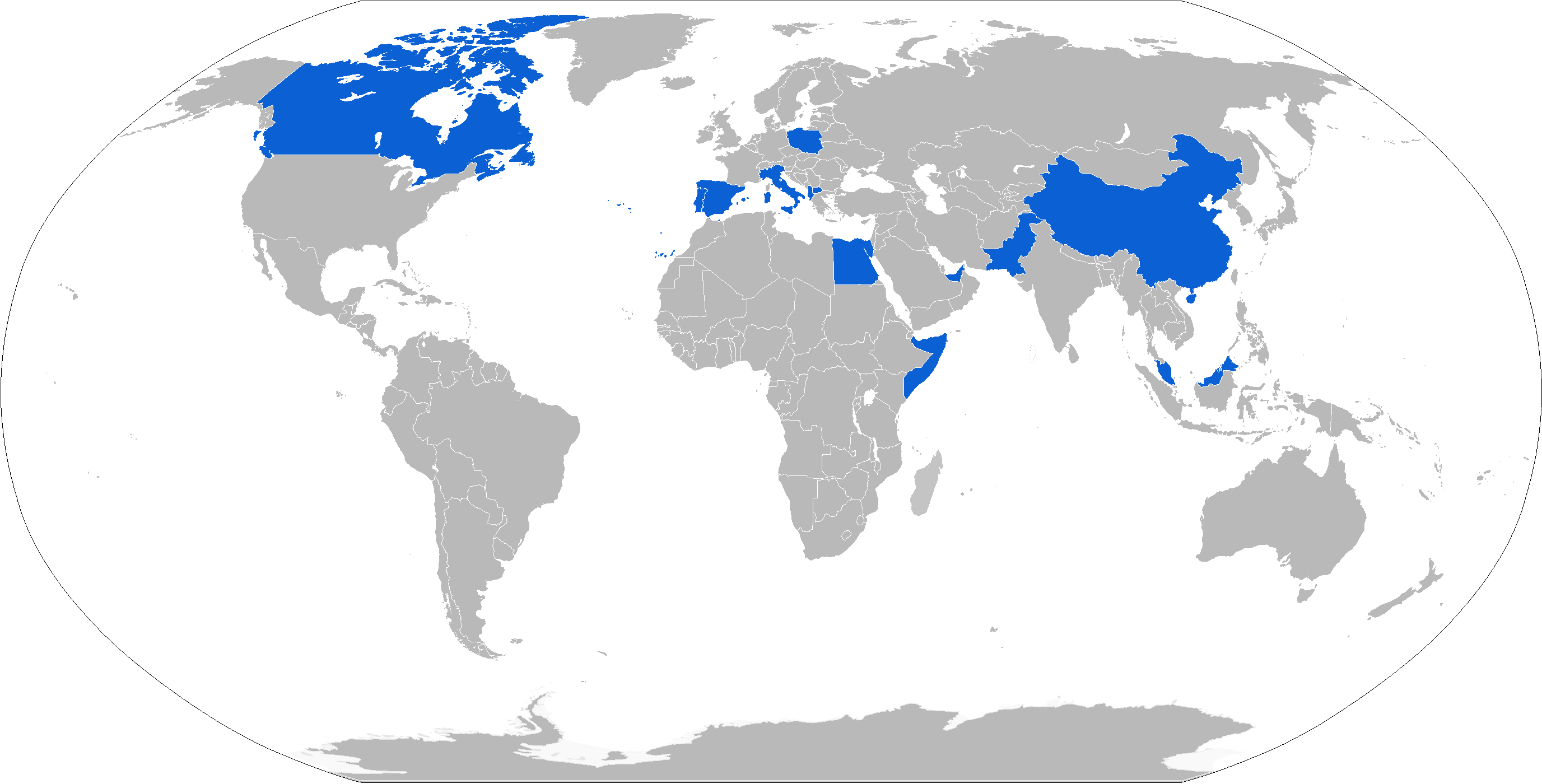
Map with VM 90 operators in blue

=== Current operators ===
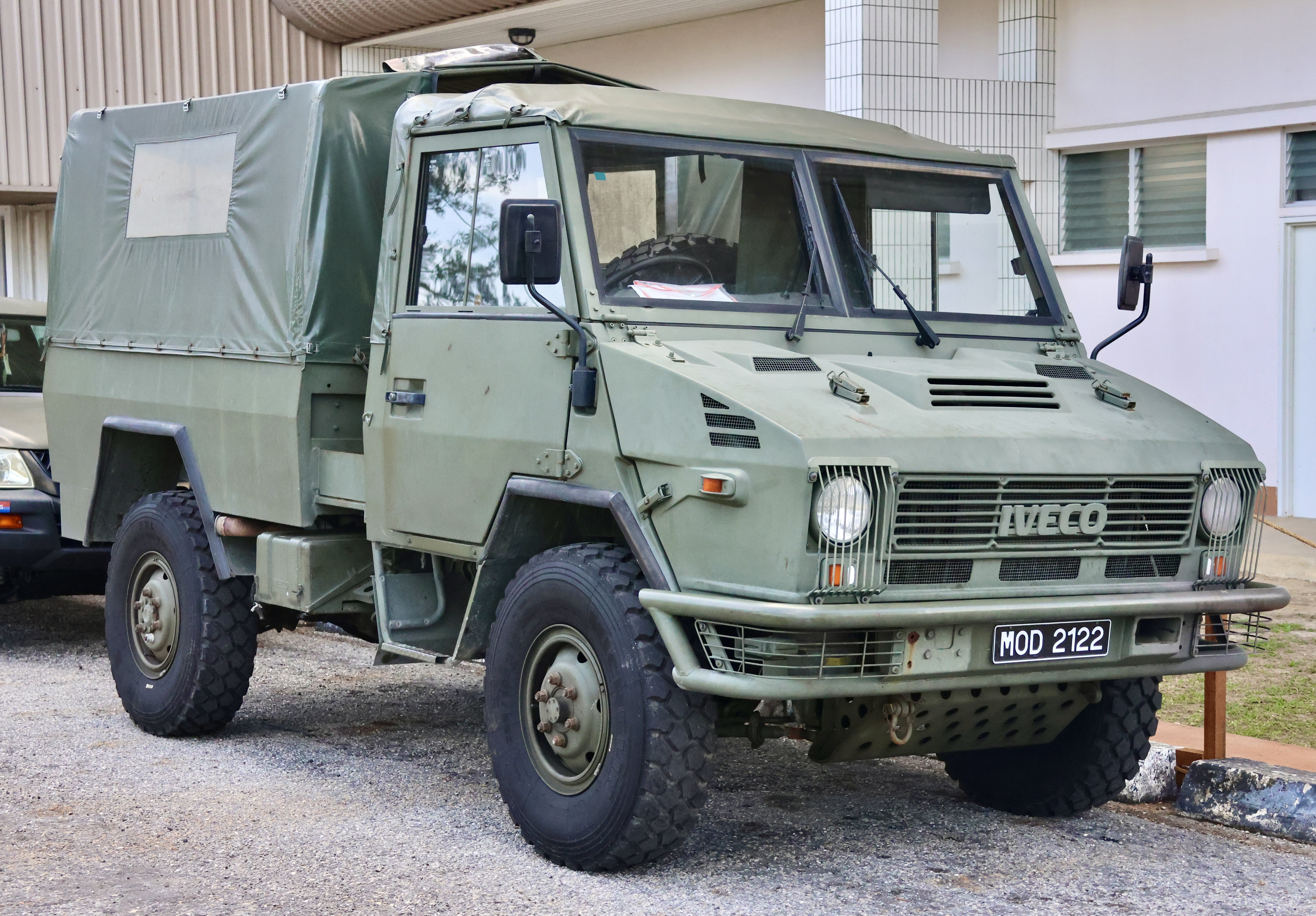
Iveco VM 90 with the Royal Brunei Land Force

- Albania : 250 (Police & Military use)
- Bangladesh
- Brunei
- Cambodia
- Canada : 2879 (manufactured under license by Western Star)
- China : produced in China by Naveco as the Nanjing NJ2046.
- Egypt : production under license since 1998, as Tiger Kader 120: 650 + 130 Ambulance version
- Italy : 3634
- Lebanon
- Moldova : few donated by Italy 2018
- Mongolia : NJ2046 variants from China seen on the State Flag Day parade in 2022
- North Macedonia
- Malaysia: 29
- Malta
- Sovereign Military Order of Malta : 3
- Pakistan : 2,200
- Poland
- Portugal: +200 operated by Portuguese Army and 17 Iveco VM 90P Protetto operated by the Republican National Guard.
- Serbia
- Somalia: donated by Italy March 2015.
- Spain
- United Arab Emirates
- Ukraine: 5. 4 VM 90P Protetto sent by Portugal in response to the 2022 Russian invasion of Ukraine. These were previously used in and modified for the Iraq War by the National Republican Guard. 1 procured and brought in May 2022 by volunteers. At least 1 was confirmed destroyed in combat by a photograph, another VM 90 was filmed being hit by a Loitering munition.
- Peru: 157

=== Civilian operators ===
- Argentina (Gendarmería Nacional)
- Belgium (Federal Police)
- Bulgaria: Bulgaria Gendarmerie

== Foreign production ==
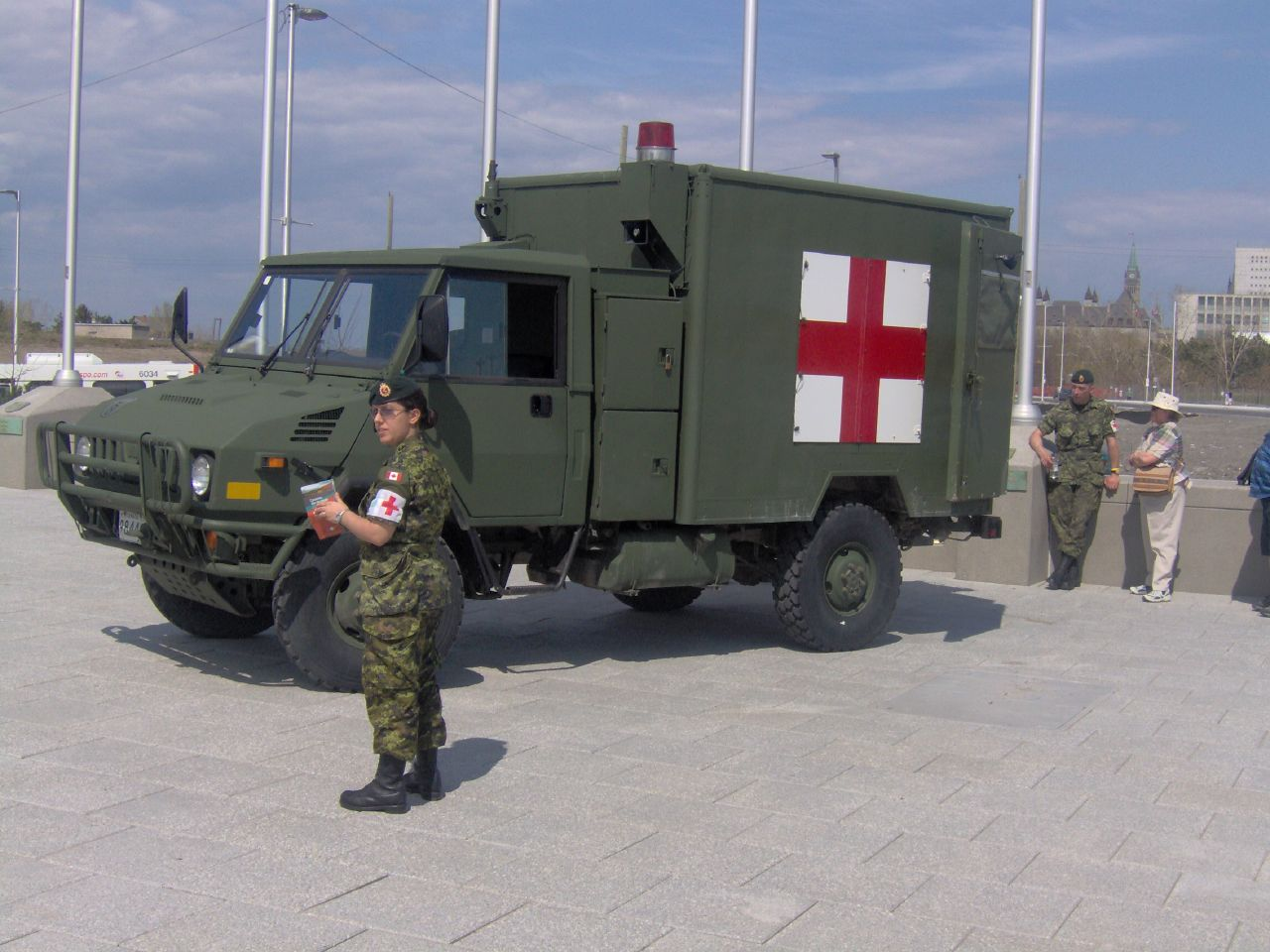
Canadian Forces LSVW light truck

Western Star, then of Canada, produced a licensed version of the VM90 for the Canadian Forces during the 1990s called the Light Support Vehicle, Wheeled, or LSVW. LSVWs feature a turbocharger to increase power to 115 horsepower (86 kW), and a four-speed automatic transmission.

== See also ==
- Iveco Daily
- Iveco LMV
- Rayton-Fissore Magnum
