= 9M133 Kornet =

Russian-made portable laser-guided anti-tank missile

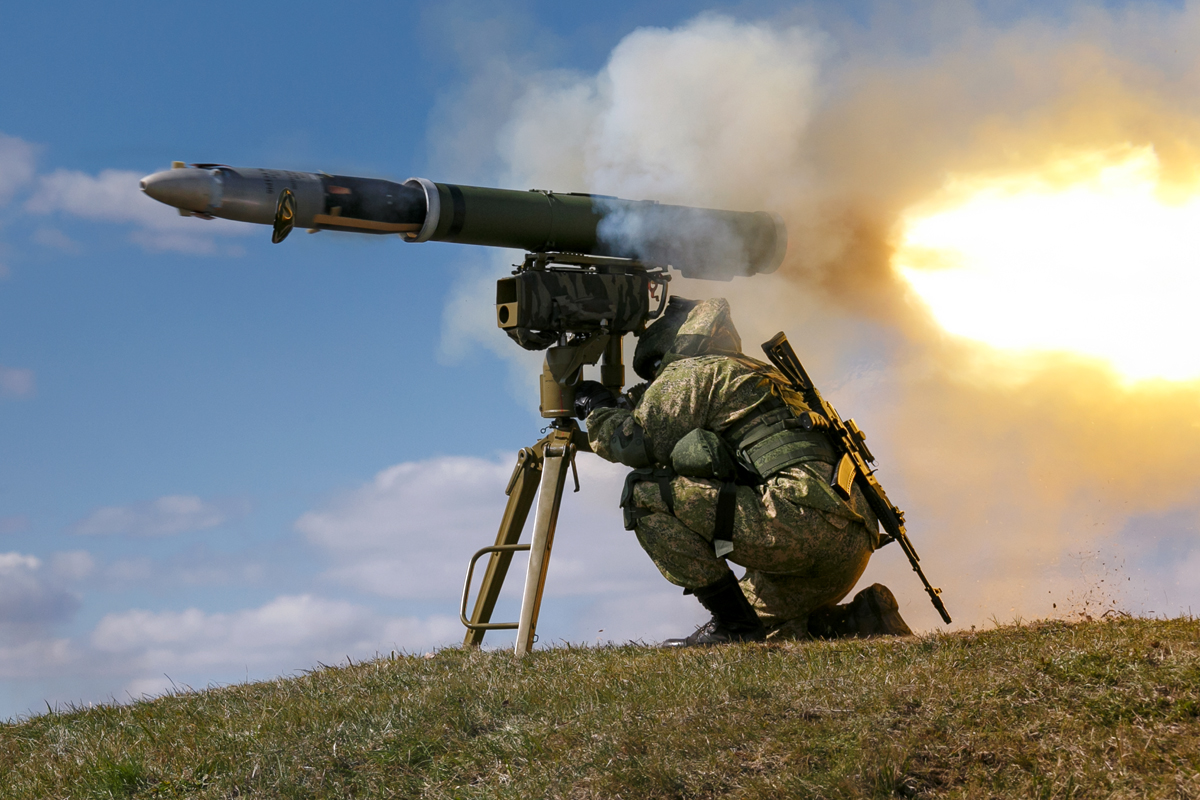
- A Russian soldier fires a Kornet missile, 2017
- Type: Anti-tank missile
- Place of origin: Russia

Service history
- In service: 1998–present
- Used by: See Operators
- Wars: Iraq War; 2006 Lebanon War; Israeli–Palestinian conflict; 2021 Israel–Palestine crisis; Gaza war; Libyan Crisis (2011–present); Syrian Civil War; War in Iraq (2013–2017); Russo-Ukrainian War; Russo-Ukrainian war (2022–present); Yemeni Civil War; Saudi Arabian-led intervention in Yemen; Sinai insurgency; 2020 Nagorno-Karabakh conflict

Production history
- Designer: KBP Instrument Design Bureau
- Designed: 1988–1998
- Manufacturer: Degtyarev plant
- Unit cost: $26,000 per missile (2019, export cost)
- Produced: 1994–present
- No. built: 35,000 (2009)
- Variants: See Variants

Specifications (9M133)
- Mass: 27 kg (29 kg with launch tube) / 63.7 kg (weight with tripod/firing unit)
- Length: 1200 mm
- Diameter: 152 mm
- Wingspan: 460 mm
- Warhead: 1,000+ (9K135), 1,200+ (E), 1,300+ (D) mm RHA penetration after ERA with Tandem HEAT, Thermobaric
- Warhead weight: 4.6 kg (10 lb) HEAT
- Detonation mechanism: Impact fuze
- Propellant: Solid-fuel rocket
- Operational range: Kornet 100–5,500 m; Kornet-EM (Note: Kornet-EM missiles are compatible with the Kornet launchers.) 8,000 m (anti-tank), 10,000 m (high explosive)
- Guidance system: SACLOS laser beam riding
- Steering system: Two control surfaces
- Accuracy: <5 m
- Launch platform: Individual, vehicles, Kornet-T, Kornet-D, Bumerang-BM, Kornet-D1, Pokpung-Ho IV

The 9M133 Kornet (Russian: Корнет; "Cornet", NATO reporting name AT-14 Spriggan, export designation Kornet-E) is a Russian man-portable anti-tank guided missile (ATGM) intended for use against main battle tanks. It was first introduced into service with the Russian army in 1998.

The Kornet is among the most capable Russian ATGMs. It was further developed into the 9M133 Kornet-EM, which has increased range, an improved warhead, and equipped with an automatic target tracker.

The Kornet has been widely exported and is produced under license in several countries. It was first used in combat in 2003 and has since been used in many conflicts.

== Development ==
The Kornet anti-tank missile was unveiled in October 1994 by the KBP Instrument Design Bureau. The missile started development in 1988 as a modular, universal system able to engage any target from a mix of platforms using a reliable laser beam guidance system that was simple to use. It is a heavy ATGM, superior to the earlier 9K111 Fagot (NATO: AT-4 Spigot) and 9K113 Konkurs (NATO: AT-5 Spandrel) wire-guided ATGMs, but is not intended to replace them (due to the cost). The missile entered service in the Russian army in 1998. Its export designation is the Kornet-E. The 9P163M-1 Kornet-T tank destroyer entered service in 2012.

North Korea has developed a clone of the Kornet known as the Bulsae-3 (English: Firebird-3), which was first revealed on 27 February 2016 publicly during a demo test.

The 9M133F-1 Kornet variant with a thermobaric warhead was expected to enter serial production in 2019, according to a company report.

The NATO reporting name AT-14 Spriggan is derived from the spriggan, a legendary creature from Cornish faery lore.

== Description ==
The 9M133 missile together with its 9P163-1 tripod launcher and 1PN79-1 thermal sight (part of the 1P45-1 guidance device), form the 9K135 missile system, which can be carried and operated by a two-person infantry crew. The transfer to the firing position takes less than one minute, and preparation and production of a shot in at least one second. When it's fired above the sight line, the Kornet ATGM allows attacking the target's upper semi-sphere, as the armor is usually thinnest on the top of a vehicle.

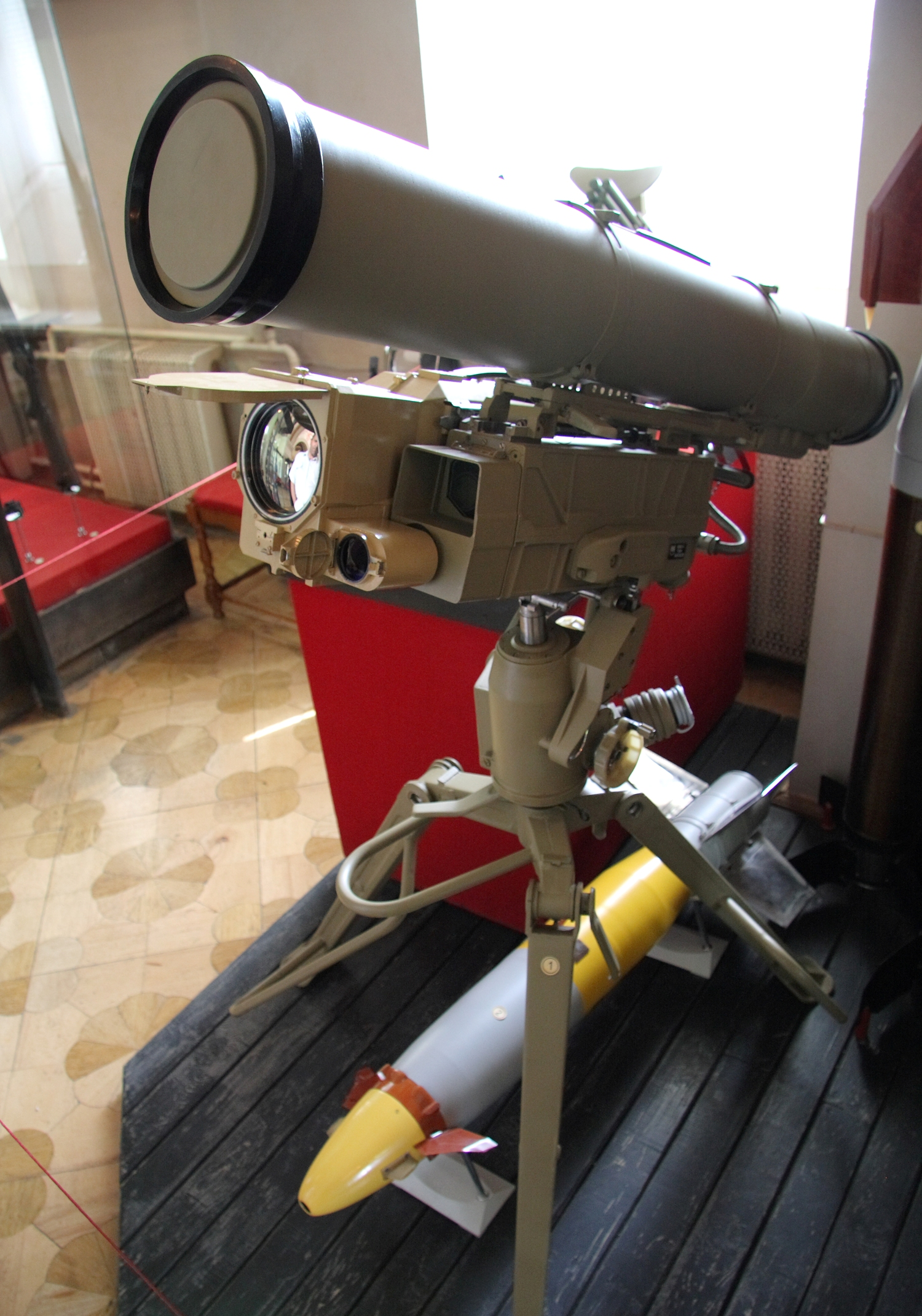
A static Kornet missile and launcher

In addition to an infantry portable version, the 9K133 system has been integrated into a variety of other vehicles and weapons systems as either an upgrade package or a new weapon system. The 9K133 has been fitted into a BMP-3 to form the 9P163M-1 tank destroyer and is similar in function to the Khrizantema missile system. The 9P163M-1 carries two 9M133 missiles on launch rails, which are extended from a stowed position during transit. Missiles are re-loaded automatically by the tank destroyer from an internal magazine with 16 rounds (missiles are stored and transported in sealed canisters). NBC protection is provided for the two crew (gunner and driver) of each 9P163M-1 in addition to full armour protection equivalent to the standard BMP-3 chassis. The guidance system of the 9P163M-1 allows two missiles to be fired at once, each operating on different guidance (laser) channels.

The KBP Instrument Design Bureau has also marketed the 9M133 missile as part of the Kvartet system for mounting on vehicles and boats; the system has four missiles on ready-to-launch rails along with associated guidance and sighting system all packaged in a single turret; the guidance system also allows two missiles to be fired at once. The turret has space for an additional five rounds and is operated by a single individual. Another upgrade possibility is the Kliver missile and gun turret, seen as an upgrade option for the BTR series of APC, BMP-1 IFV and patrol boats. It has similar capabilities as the Kvartet turret, but also carries a 30 mm 2A72 cannon; turret weight is 1,500 kg. Finally the 9M133 is also available in the BEREZHOK turret upgrade also made available by KBP. Since 2014, its serial production has been resumed for the domestic market with the designation B05YA01.

=== Kornet-EM ===
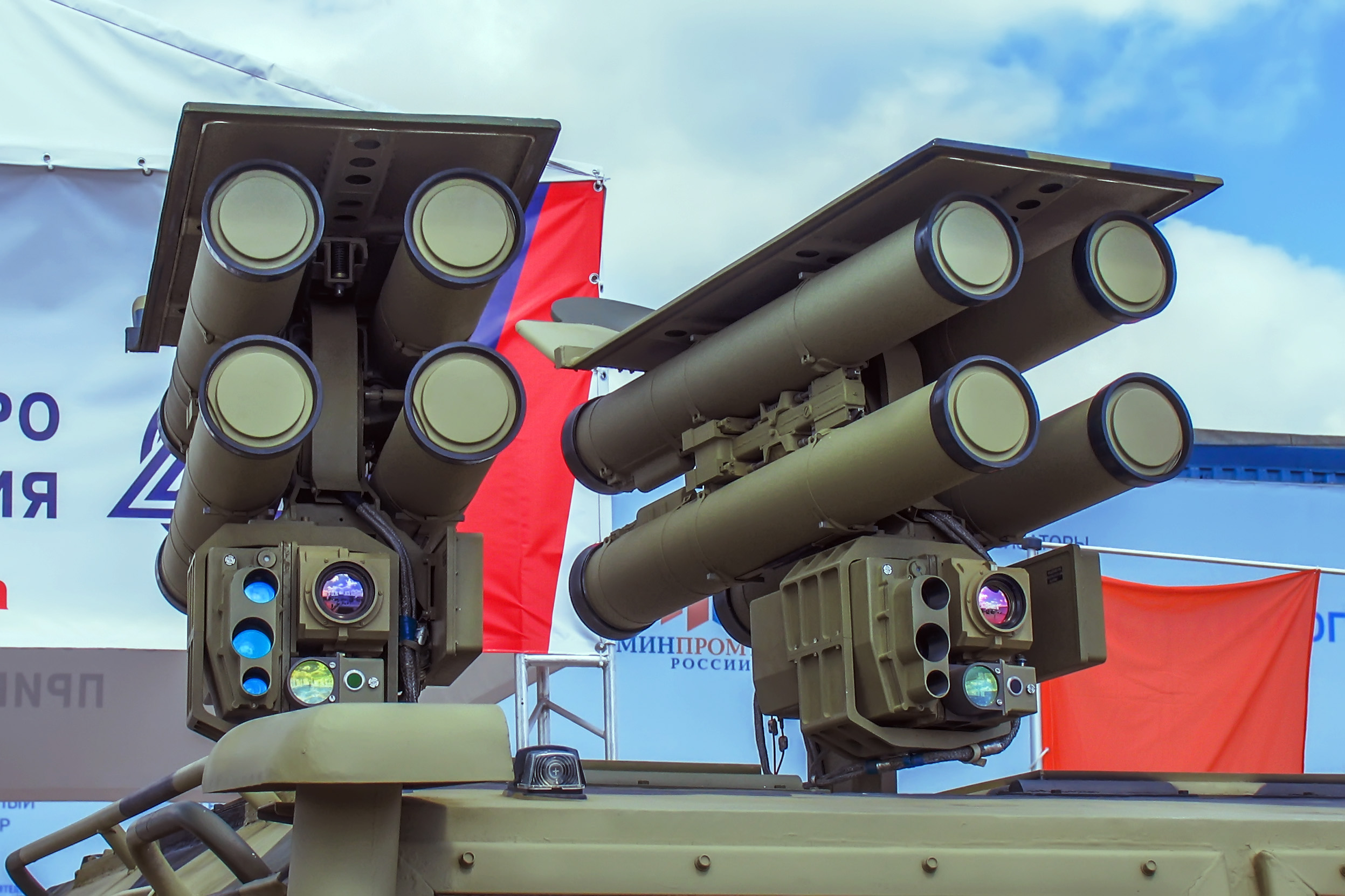
Kornet-EM missiles on a Kornet-D launcher.

The 9M133 Kornet-EM is an improved variant introduced in 2012 that is designed to defeat vehicles with explosive reactive armor (ERA). Its vehicle mounted version is equipped with an automatic target tracker in lieu of a proper fire-and-forget capability. Instead of manually placing the crosshairs on target throughout the missiles flight, the operator designates a target once and the computer tracks the target as the missile travels towards it until impact. New beam coding also allows a vehicle equipped with twin launchers to attack two different targets at once, increasing its rate of fire, decreases the number of vehicles needed for a mission, and can defeat vehicles equipped with an active protection system through salvo fire at one target. The system's use of an autotracker can make it effective against low-flying aerial threats like helicopters and unmanned aerial vehicles (UAVs).

Kornet-EM is mainly used on the Kornet-D system. A remote-control system intended for firing the Kornet-EM missile completed testing in February 2025. The station reportedly has artificial intelligence elements.

The Kornet-EM first entered service with the Russian Army; its first export customer was Bahrain. It has also been exported to Algeria. It is built under license in Saudi Arabia.

=== Tharallah ===
Tharallah is a twin-Kornet system used by the Hezbollah since 2015. It consists of a quadripod equipped with two Kornet tubes to be launched in quick succession. This arrangement is designed to overwhelm the Trophy APS of Merkava tanks by having a second missile available before the APS can react after the first intercept.

== 9M134 Bulat ==
9M134 Bulat
- Type: Anti-tank missile
- Place of origin: Russia

Service history
- Used by: Russia

Production history
- Designer: KBP Instrument Design Bureau
- Designed: 2024(;)
- Produced: 2025
- No. built: Unknown

Specifications
- Mass: 6.5 kg / 26.5 kg (weight of the package with two missiles)
- Length: 831 m
- Diameter: 82 mm
- Warhead: 250+ mm RHA penetration after ERA with Tandem HEAT
- Warhead weight: 1.6 kg (3.5 lb) HEAT
- Detonation mechanism: Impact fuze
- Propellant: Solid-fuel rocket
- Operational range: 3,500+ m
- Guidance system: SACLOS laser beam riding
- Steering system: Two control surfaces

The 9M134 Bulat is a lightweight variant of the 9M133 Kornet ATGM, optimized for engaging medium-armored targets such as IFVs and APCs. Weighing only 6.5 kg in its container, it is about four times lighter than other Kornet missiles, enhancing mobility and allowing teams to carry more ammunition. The missile has a range of 3.5+ km and features a tandem warhead with 250 mm penetration capability, effective even against reactive armor. Guided by a noiseless laser beam, the Bulat integrates with existing Kornet systems, providing a cost-effective solution for lighter threats while reserving heavier Kornet munitions for tanks. First showcased at the Army-2024 forum, the Bulat highlights Russia's focus on versatile anti-tank solutions. Its trials completed in February 2025.

== Combat history ==
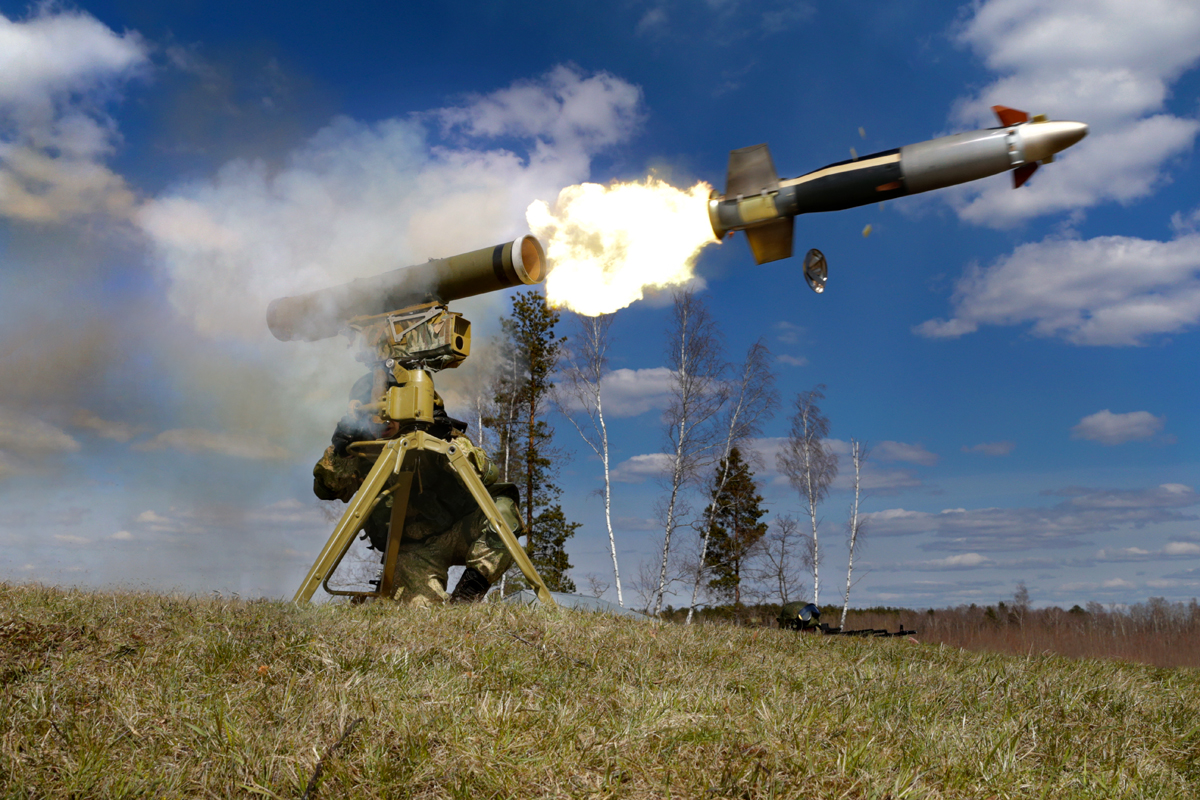
Kornet launch

During the Iraq War, Kornets were used by some groups of Iraqi special forces to attack U.S. armored vehicles, disabling at least two Abrams tanks and one Bradley infantry fighting vehicle in the opening week of the war.

The second verified episode of the Kornet ATGM in combat use occurred during the 2006 Lebanon War, where the missiles, reportedly supplied by Syria which were reverse-engineered Kornets produced in North Korea, were used by Hezbollah fighters to destroy up to four Israeli Merkava tanks. Kornets pierced the armor of 24 tanks in total. One of the first detailed accounts of IDF's successful capture of Kornet ATGMs on Hezbollah positions in the village of Ghandouriyeh appeared in a Daily Telegraph article, which also reported that the boxes were marked with "Customer: Ministry of Defense of Syria. Supplier: KBP, Tula, Russia". Several months after the cease-fire, reports have provided sufficient photographic evidence that Kornet ATGMs were indeed both in possession of, and used by, Hezbollah in this area.

Israel claims that Russian weapons were smuggled to Hezbollah by Syria, and Israel has sent a team of officials to Moscow to show Russia the evidence of what they say can only be Syrian weapons transfers. Russian officials denied that Russian Kornet ended up in the hands of Hezbollah, adding that the anti-tank weapons used by Hezbollah were different. On 6 December 2010, a Kornet launched from the Gaza Strip penetrated the outer armour of a Merkava Mark III tank on the Israeli side of the border, but it caused no injuries.

On 7 April 2011, Hamas claimed responsibility for a missile strike on an Israeli yellow school bus which killed a 16-year-old boy, Daniel Viflic, and wounded another civilian (all the other children who were on the bus had left a few minutes earlier). According to Israeli military spokesman, the bus was hit by a Kornet missile.

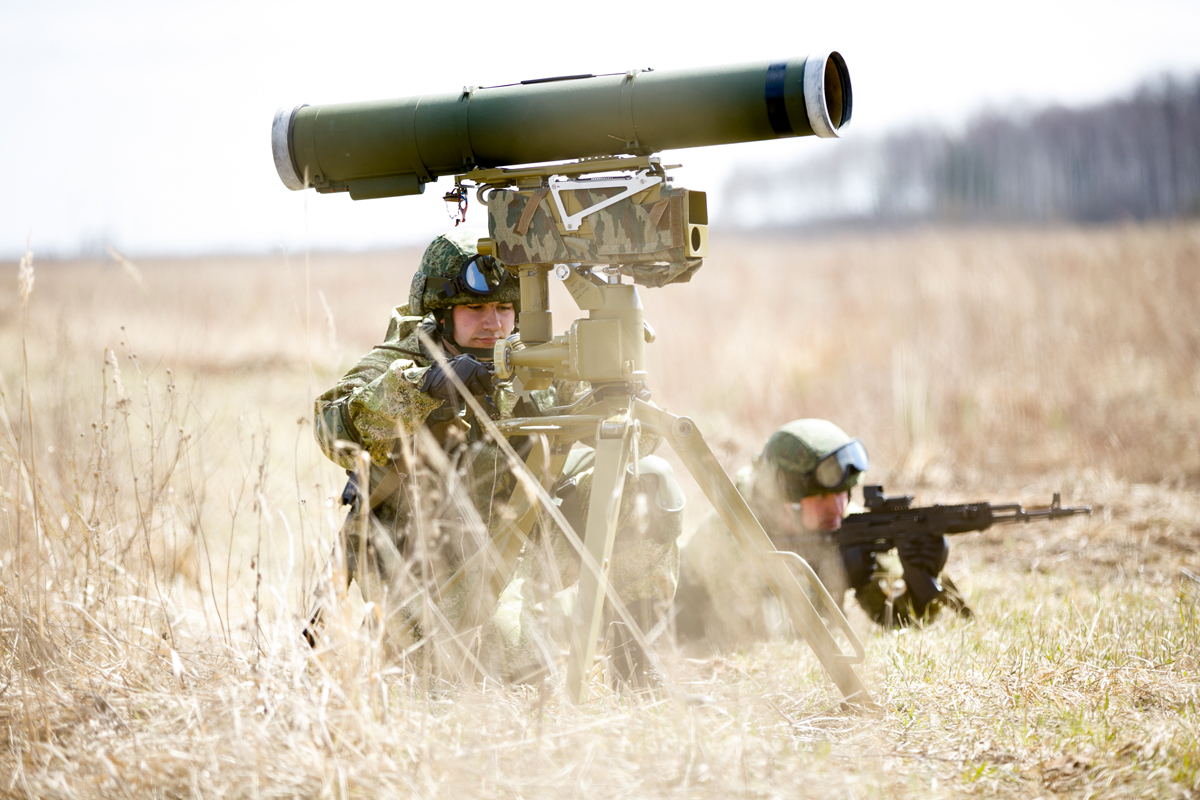
Kornet in Russian service

During the 2014 Gaza War, of the 15 anti-tank missiles launched at Israeli tanks that were intercepted by the Israeli active protection system Trophy, most were of the Kornet type. In some cases the Kornet launchers were destroyed after the Trophy system had detected the launch and directed the tank's main gun to the launcher position.

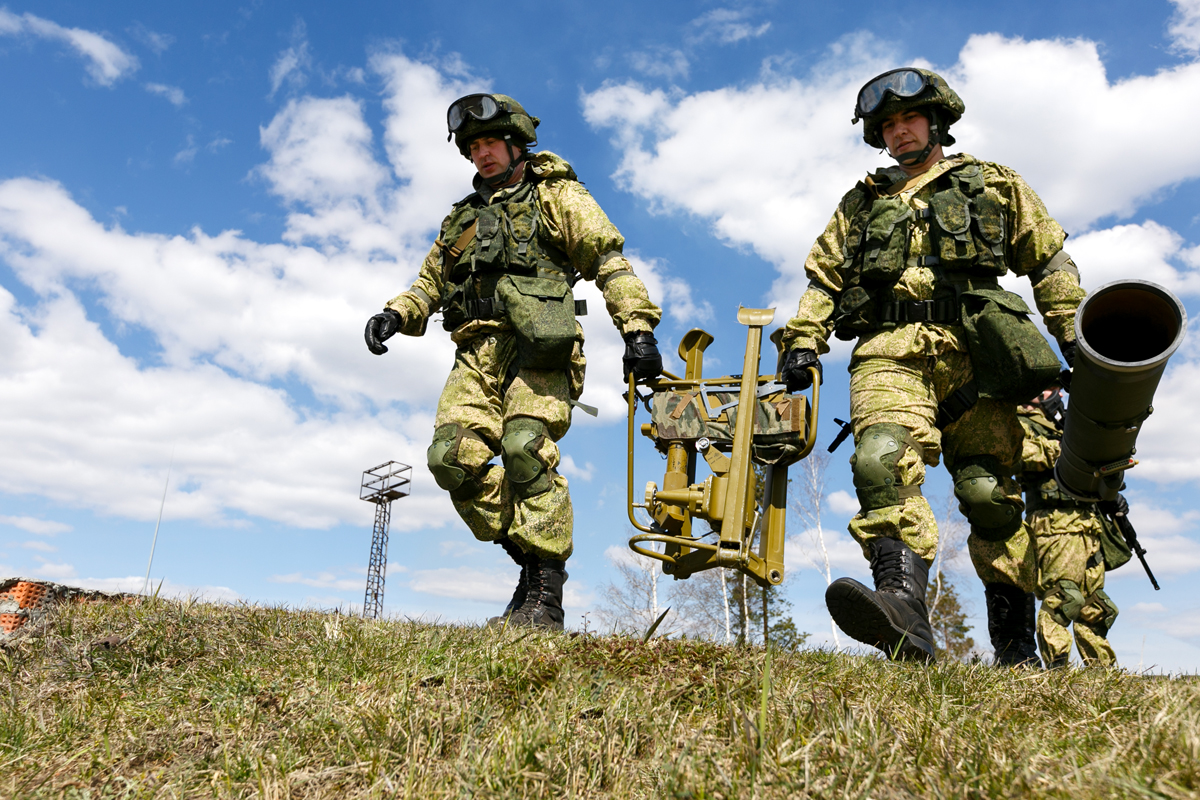
The 9K135 Kornet can be broken down and carried by two men.

In the summer of 2014 the armor of Iraqi Army M1A1 Abrams tanks was penetrated 5 times: Kornet missiles were responsible for at least some of these penetrations. In September 2014, the Iraqi Army used Kornet missiles against Islamic State militants for the first time. Iraqi security forces claimed five IS-operated vehicles along with fighters were destroyed in Diyala Governorate. Three Iraqi Army squadrons have been trained to use the Kornet anti-tank missile.

In the January 2015 Shebaa farms incident, Hezbollah fired some Kornet anti-tank missiles against two Israeli Humvees. A soldier and an officer were killed. In 2015 Iran succeeded in reverse-engineering the Kornet. Iran arms Hezbollah and there is speculation Iranian Kornets were used against Israel in the border attack.

After the 2011 Libyan civil war, the Libyan army's stockpiles were looted and many weapons, including Kornet missiles, proliferated through the region. Many of the Kornet missiles fell in the hands of Ansar Bait al-Maqdis in Egypt's Sinai peninsula. In the Sinai insurgency, Kornet missiles become a key weapon in attacking Egyptian Armed Forces. Ansar Bait al-Maqdis has used the missile on M1A1 and M60 tanks, helicopters (AH-64) and a navy ship. The group has since become a branch of ISIL, renaming itself ISIL-Sinai Province.

Reuters have found remains of used Kornet missiles in Ukraine in the context of the 2014–2015 Russian military intervention in Ukraine. Since Ukraine is not a known operator of Kornet, Reuters quoted the International Institute for Strategic Studies that the missiles were most likely sent into Ukraine by Russia.

Russia has sent over 1,000 Kornet-9M133 anti-tank guided missiles to the Syrian Government who have used them extensively against armour and ground targets to fight Jihadists and rebels. In 2016, a Syrian Army Solntsepyok TOS-1 was destroyed by a Kornet missile from unknown Syrian opposition forces.

Iran has supplied their license-built Kornet missiles, under their name Dehalivieh, to at least one Iraqi non-state actor. In addition, Kornet missiles were widely used in the Iraqi Civil War by the Iraqi government and the Popular Mobilization Units.

In January 2017, the German newspaper Die Welt reported that ISIL fighters used Kornets to destroy six Leopard 2 tanks used by the Turkish military in Syria. An ISIL propaganda video released in March 2017 showed ISIL fighters capturing two Kornets being transported in Syria, which show the manufacturing year of 2016.

On 1 September 2019, a Kornet was used by Hezbollah forces to fire on Israeli military stations in retaliation for the bombings of a Hezbollah media office a week earlier. Israel responded with artillery barrages on Lebanese villages close to the border, specifically Aitaroun and Maroun al-Ras, which set fire to a number of civilian crop fields.

On 26 February 2022, a Kornet was used by Russian troops against a Ukrainian armored vehicle. In October 2022 a Russian Kornet was captured by Ukrainian Naval Infantry. In July 2023, Russian troops first used the Kornet ATGM in conjunction with the Kurgan remote control system. A Kornet missile's 10-pound warhead can punch through more than 100 cm of armor behind ERA.

On 4 September 2023, a video emerged from Robotyne which showed the first combat loss of the Challenger 2 tank. The tank was disabled by a mine and then reportedly hit by a Kornet missile and burst into flames. A missile triggered a fire that apparently cooked off the Challenger 2's ammunition charges in their special containers. These containers are supposed to prevent catastrophic secondary explosions, but they failed, and the resulting blast wrenched the Challenger 2's turret from its hull.

== Missile variants ==
	9M133 (Kornet/Kornet-E)	9M133-1 (Kornet/Kornet-E)	9M133M-2 (Kornet-M/Kornet-EM)	9M133F-1 (Kornet/Kornet-E)	9M133F-2 (Kornet-M/Kornet-EM)	9M133F-3 (Kornet-M/Kornet-EM)	9M134 Bulat
Diameter	160 mm Launcher body / 152 mm Missile Calibre / 460 mm wingspan						82 mm Missile Calibre
Length	1.1 m missile / 1.21 m tube						0.83 m tube
Weight (including container)	29 kg (64 lb)	29 kg (64 lb)	31 kg (68 lb)	29 kg (64 lb)	31 kg (68 lb)	33 kg (73 lb)	6.5 kg (14 lb) (cont. exl.)
Speed	>250 m/s	>250 m/s	300 m/s	>250 m/s	300 m/s	320 m/s	-
Range (daytime)	100–5,000 m	100–5,500 m	150–8,000 m	100–5,500 m	150–8,000 m	150–10,000 m	3,500+ m
Warhead	Tandem HEAT (OKFOL (HMX Based)) 152 mm Ø Main Charge	Tandem HEAT (OKFOL (HMX Based)) 152 mm Ø Main Charge	Tandem HEAT (OKFOL (HMX Based)) 152 mm Ø Main Charge	Thermobaric Warhead (RDX, Aluminium & isopropyl nitrate) 10 kg (22 lb) TNT equivalent	Thermobaric 10 kg (22 lb) TNT equivalent	Blast Fragmentation 7 kg (15 lb)	Tandem HEAT 1.6 kg (3.5 lb)
Penetration	<1,000 mm of RHA behind ERA	1,000–1,200 mm of RHA behind ERA; 3–3.5 m of concrete	1,100–1,300 mm of RHA behind ERA; 3–3.5 m of concrete	Anti-personnel Blast weapon. Limited shrapnel.		Anti-personnel weapon. Limited penetration of fragments of light skinned vehicles and structures.	250+ mm of RHA behind ERA

== Operators ==
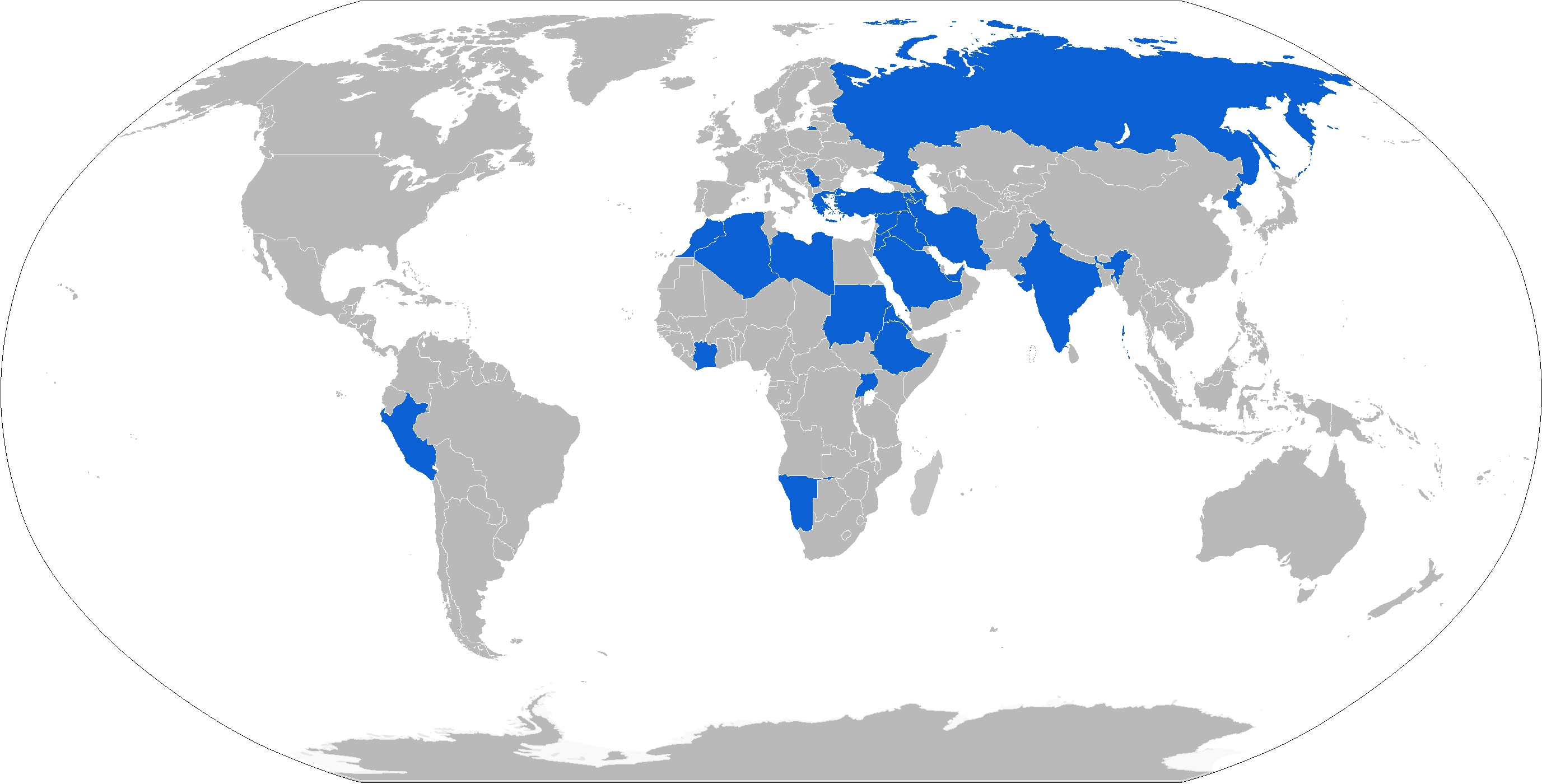
Map with operators 9M133 in blue.

=== Current operators ===
- Algeria – 3,000 missiles ordered in 2006. 340 Berezhok turrets were ordered in 2014 to equip BMP-1s, BMP-2s and T-62. Kornet-EM also ordered.
- Armenia – 50 launchers, 200 missiles received in 2013.
- Azerbaijan
- Bahrain – Kornet-EM ordered
- Ethiopia
- Eritrea – 80 Kornet-E's were delivered in 2005
- Greece – 196 launchers with 1,100+ missiles, in service as of 2008. All Humvee-mounted
- India – 3,000 missiles including over 250 launchers were delivered between 2003 and 2006.
- Iran – Licensed local production as Dehlavieh. 9M133-1 Kornet-E, 9M133F-1 (Kornet-EM), and Kornet-D systems known to be produced
- Iraq – reported since 2014
- Israel - Captured from Hezbollah
- Ivory Coast –
- Jordan – 200 Kornet-E launchers with 2,000 missiles. Being produced locally under license Kornet-E missiles.
- Kuwait
- Libya – Used in 2011 Civil War by Gaddafi loyalists
- Morocco – 2200 Kornet missiles ordered in 2000.
- Namibia – unknown number ordered in 2014.
- North Korea – domestically produced as the Bulsae-5
- Pakistan – 52 Kornet-E ATGWs ordered in 2017–2018 and likely to have included hundreds of missiles.
- Peru – 288 missiles and 24 launchers plus training simulators and technical support. The contract (worth US$24 million) was signed in 2008. All missiles delivered in January 2010. As of June 2013, it is currently negotiating the purchase of additional units.
- Qatar
- Russia – In production as of 2026. 540 Berezhok turrets were ordered in 2017 to equip BMP-2 and BMD-2 vehicles.
- Saudi Arabia Kornet-EM produced under license
- Serbia Kornet-EM delivered in 2021.
- Sudan
- Syria – 100 Kornet-E launchers with 1,000 missiles as of 2013. Received about 1,500 more between 2002 and 2006.
- Turkey – 80 launchers with 800 missiles
- United Arab Emirates
- Ukraine – captured from Russian forces.
- Uganda – 1,000 Kornet-E missiles ordered in 2010 and delivered between 2012 and 2013.

=== Non-state operators ===
- Ahrar al-Sham
- Free Syrian Army
- Qassam Brigades
- Hezbollah – Supplied by Syria and used in 2006 Lebanon war, 2015 Shebaa Farms operation and Syrian civil war
- Iraqi Kurdistan – KDP Peshmerga
- Islamic State
- Islamic State Sinai Province
- Luhansk People's Republic
- People's Defense Units (YPG)
- Popular Front for the Liberation of Palestine
- Popular Mobilization Forces
- Tahrir al-Sham
- Houthis

== See also ==
- 9K111 Fagot – (Soviet Union)
- 9K115-2 Metis-M – (Russia)
- 9M123 Khrizantema – (Russia)
- BGM-71 TOW – (United States)
- HJ-8/HJ-9 – (China)
- ZT3 Ingwe – (South Africa)
- MAPATS – (Israel)
- Nag ATGM – (India)
- Shershen – (Belarus)
- Skif – (Ukraine)
- L-OMTAS – (Turkey)
