= History of India (1947–present) =

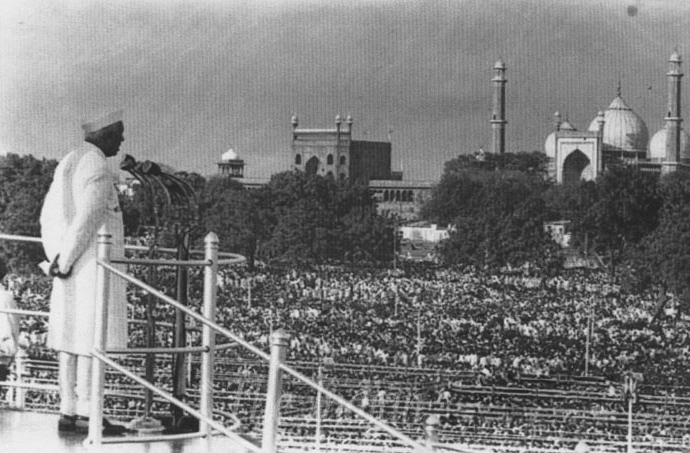
Jawaharlal Nehru, the first prime minister of India, often regarded as the architect of modern India, addressing a newly independent India on 15 August 1947

The history of independent India or history of Republic of India began when the country became an independent sovereign state within the British Commonwealth on 15 August 1947. Direct administration by the British, which began in 1858, affected a political and economic unification of the subcontinent. When British rule came to an end in 1947, the subcontinent was partitioned along religious lines into two separate countries—India, with a majority of Hindus, and Pakistan, with a majority of Muslims, on the midnight of August 14-15 1947. Concurrently the Muslim-majority northwest and east of British India was separated into the Dominion of Pakistan, by the Partition of India. The partition led to a population transfer of more than 10 million people between India and Pakistan and the death of about one million people. Indian National Congress leader Jawaharlal Nehru became the first Prime Minister of India, but the leader most associated with the independence struggle, Mahatma Gandhi, accepted no office. The constitution adopted in 1950 made India a democratic republic with Westminster style parliamentary system of government, both at federal and state level respectively. The democracy has been sustained since then. India's sustained democratic freedoms are unique among the world's newly independent states, despite its history being perforated by several crises. and recent worries of democratic backsliding under the premiership of Narendra Modi.

Map of India with states and union territories

The country has faced religious violence, casteism, corruption, malnutrition, poverty, unemployment, language conflicts, naxalism, terrorism, separatist insurgencies in Jammu and Kashmir, North East India and gender-based violence. India has unresolved territorial disputes over Kashmir and Arunachal Pradesh with China which escalated into a war in 1962 and 1967, Kashmir with Pakistan which resulted in wars in 1947–1948, 1965, 1971 and 1999 and Kalapani with Nepal. India was neutral in the Cold War, and was a leader in the Non-Aligned Movement. However, it made a loose alliance with the Soviet Union from 1971, when Pakistan was allied with the United States and the People's Republic of China.

Map Showing Disputed Territories Of India

India is a nuclear-weapon state, having conducted its first nuclear test in 1974, followed by another five tests in 1998. From the 1950s to the 1980s, India followed socialist-inspired policies. The economy was influenced by extensive regulation, protectionism and public ownership, leading to pervasive corruption and slow economic growth. Since 1991, India has pursued more economic liberalisation. Today, India is the sixth largest economy in the world by nominal GDP, third largest economy in purchasing parity power and the fastest-growing economy in the world.

From being a struggling country in its formative years, the Republic of India has emerged as a fast growing G20 major economy. India has sometimes been referred to as a great power and a potential superpower given its large and growing economy, military and population.

== 1947–1950: Dominion of India ==
Independent India's first years were marked with turbulent events—a massive exchange of population with Pakistan, the Indo-Pakistani War of 1947 and the integration of over 500 princely states to form a united nation. Vallabhbhai Patel, Jawaharlal Nehru and Mahatma Gandhi also ensured that the constitution of independent India would be secular.

=== Partition of India ===
The partition of India was outlined in the Indian Independence Act 1947. It led to the dissolution of the British Raj in South Asia and the creation of two independent dominions: India and Pakistan. The change of political borders notably included the division of two provinces of British India, (Note: British India consisted of those regions of the British Raj, or the British Indian Empire, which were directly administered by Britain; other regions of nominal sovereignty that were indirectly ruled by Britain were called princely states.) Bengal and Punjab. The majority Muslim districts in these provinces were awarded to Pakistan and the majority non-Muslim to India. The other assets that were divided included the British Indian Army, the Royal Indian Navy, the Royal Indian Air Force, the Indian Civil Service, the railways, and the central treasury. Self-governing independent Pakistan and India legally came into existence at midnight on 14 and 15 August 1947 respectively.

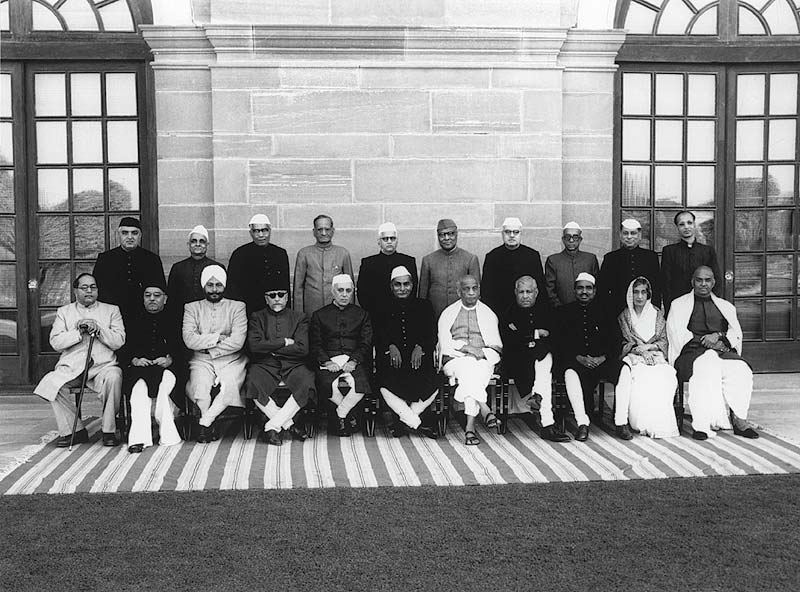
The first Cabinet of independent India (Note: The first Cabinet of independent India (L to R sitting) B. R. Ambedkar, Rafi Ahmed Kidwai, Sardar Baldev Singh, Maulana Abul Kalam Azad, Jawaharlal Nehru, Rajendra Prasad, Sardar Patel, John Mathai, Jagjivan Ram, Amrit Kaur and Syama Prasad Mukherjee. (L to R standing) Khurshed Lal, R. R. Diwakar, Mohanlal Saksena, N. Gopalaswami Ayyangar, N.V. Gadgil, K. C. Neogy, Jairamdas Daulatram, K. Santhanam, Satya Narayan Sinha and B. V. Keskar)

The partition caused large-scale loss of life and an unprecedented migration between the two dominions. Among refugees who survived, it solidified the belief that safety lay among co-religionists. In the instance of Pakistan, it made palpable a hitherto only-imagined refuge for the Muslims of British India. The migrations took place hastily and with little warning. It is thought that between 14 million and 18 million people moved, and perhaps more. Excess mortality during the period of the partition is usually estimated to have been around one million. The violent nature of the partition created an atmosphere of hostility and suspicion between India and Pakistan that affects their relationship to this day.

An estimated 3.5 million Hindus and Sikhs living in West Punjab, North-West Frontier Province, Baluchistan, East Bengal and Sind migrated to India in fear of domination and suppression in Muslim Pakistan. Communal violence killed an estimated one million Hindus, Muslims and Sikhs, and gravely destabilised both dominions along their Punjab and Bengal boundaries, and the cities of Calcutta, Delhi and Lahore. The violence was stopped by early September owing to the co-operative efforts of both Indian and Pakistani leaders, and especially due to the efforts of Mahatma Gandhi, the leader of the Indian freedom struggle, who undertook a fast-unto-death in Calcutta and later in Delhi to calm people and emphasise peace despite the threat to his life. Both governments constructed large relief camps for incoming and leaving refugees, and the Indian Army was mobilised to provide humanitarian assistance on a massive scale.

I find no parallel in history for a body of converts and their descendants claiming to be a nation apart from the parent stock.

— Mahatma Gandhi, opposing the division of India on the basis of religion in 1945.

The assassination of Mahatma Gandhi on 30 January 1948 was carried out by Nathuram Godse, who held him responsible for partition and charged that Mahatma Gandhi was appeasing Muslims. More than one million people flooded the streets of Delhi to follow the procession to cremation grounds and pay their last respects.

In 1949, India recorded almost 1 million Hindu refugees into West Bengal and other states from East Pakistan, owing to communal violence, intimidation, and repression from Muslim authorities. The plight of the refugees outraged Hindus and Indian nationalists, and the refugee population drained the resources of Indian states, who were unable to absorb them. While not ruling out war, Prime Minister Nehru and Sardar Patel invited Liaquat Ali Khan for talks in Delhi. Although many Indians termed this appeasement, Nehru signed a pact with Liaquat Ali Khan that pledged both nations to the protection of minorities and creation of minority commissions. Although opposed to the principle, Patel decided to back this pact for the sake of peace, and played a critical role in garnering support from West Bengal and across India, and enforcing the provisions of the pact. Khan and Nehru also signed a trade agreement, and committed to resolving bilateral disputes through peaceful means. Steadily, hundreds of thousands of Hindus returned to East Pakistan, but the thaw in relations did not last long, primarily owing to the Kashmir dispute.

Political integration of India
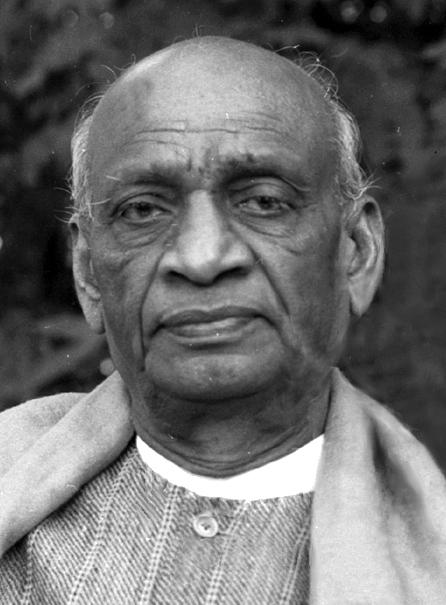
Sardar Vallabhbhai Patel as Minister for Home and States Affairs had the responsibility of welding the British Indian provinces and the princely states into a united India.

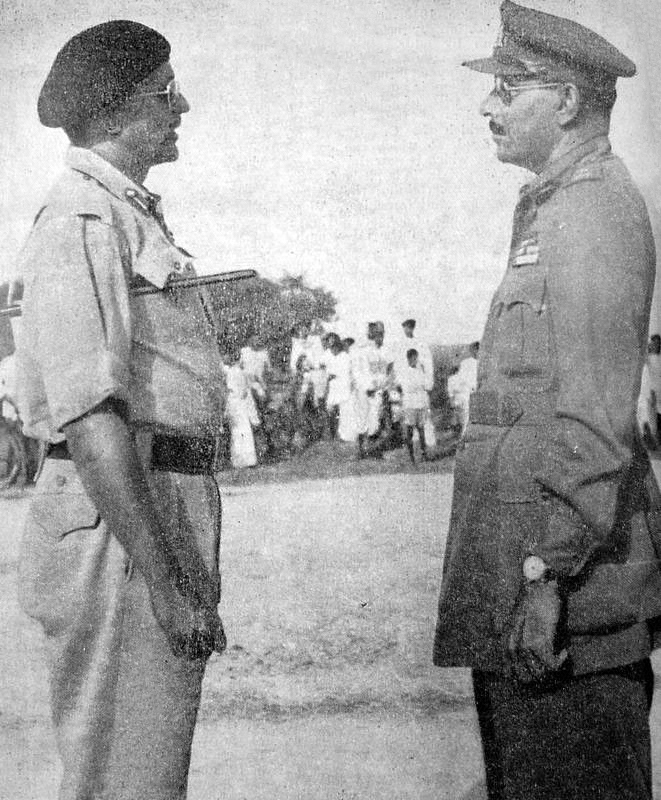
General El Edroos (at right) offers his surrender of the Hyderabad State Forces to Major General (later General and Army Chief) Joyanto Nath Chaudhuri at Secunderabad.

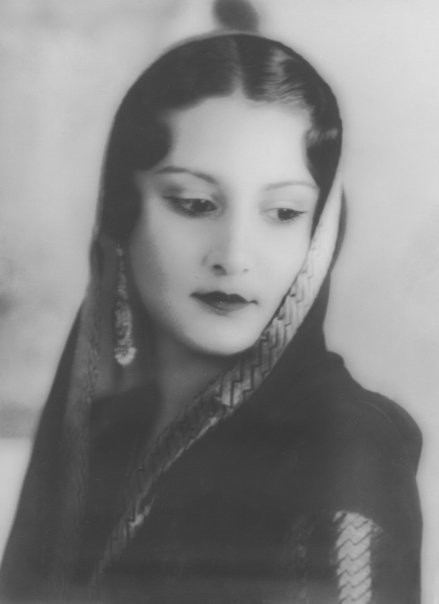
Queen Kanchan Prabha Devi of the Kingdom of Tripura signed the instrument of accession to India. She played a pivotal role in rehabilitating refugees and victims of the violence associated with the Partition of India in the state of Tripura.

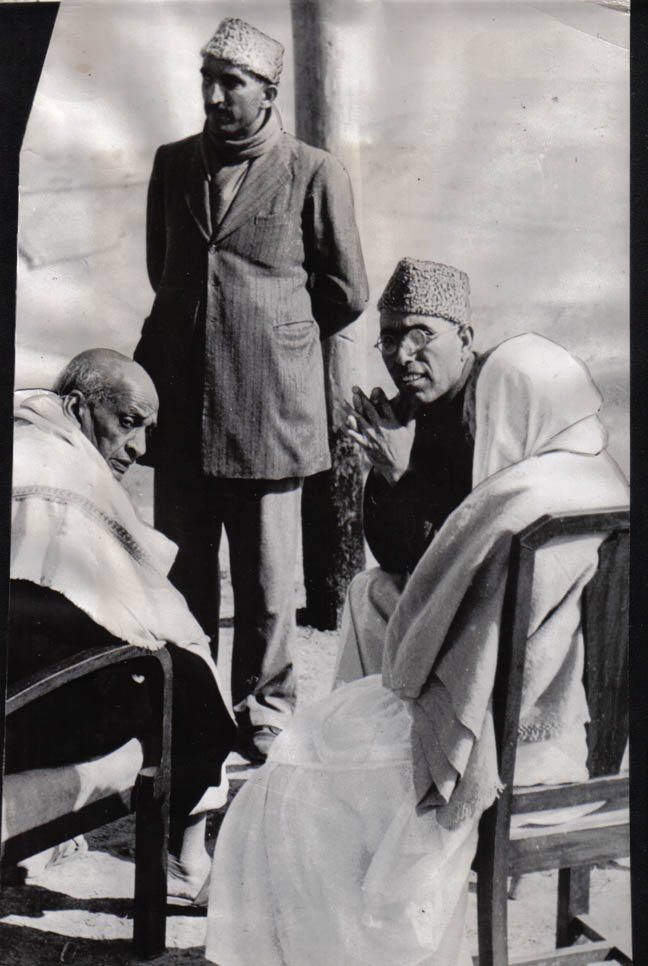
Sheikh Mohammed Abdullah (right), chosen to head the emergency interim government in Kashmir after Maharaja Hari Singh signed Kashmir's Instrument of Accession to India.

=== Integration of princely states ===
In July 1946, Jawaharlal Nehru pointedly observed that no princely state could prevail militarily against the army of independent India. In January 1947, Nehru said that independent India would not accept the divine right of kings. In May 1947, he declared that any princely state which refused to join the Constituent Assembly would be treated as an enemy state. British India consisted of 17 provinces, which existed alongside 565 princely states. The provinces were given to India or Pakistan, in two particular cases—Punjab and Bengal—after being partitioned. The princes of the princely states, however, were given the right to either remain independent or accede to either dominion. Thus India's leaders were faced with the prospect of inheriting a fragmented country with independent states and kingdoms dispersed across the mainland. Under the leadership of Sardar Vallabhbhai Patel, the new Government of India employed political negotiations backed with the option (and, on several occasions, the use) of military action to ensure the primacy of the central government and of the Constitution then being drafted. Sardar Patel and V. P. Menon convinced the rulers of princely states contiguous to India to accede to India. Many rights and privileges of the rulers of the princely states, especially their personal estates and privy purses, were guaranteed to convince them to accede. Some of them were made Rajpramukh (governor) and Uprajpramukh (deputy governor) of the merged states. Many small princely states were merged to form viable administrative states such as Saurashra, PEPSU, Vindhya Pradesh and Madhya Bharat. Some princely states such as Tripura and Manipur acceded later in 1949.

There were three states that proved more difficult to integrate than others:

1. Junagadh (Hindu-majority state with a Muslim Nawab)—a December 1947 plebiscite resulted in a 99% vote to merge with India, annulling the controversial accession to Pakistan, which was made by the Nawab against the wishes of the people of the state who were overwhelmingly Hindu and despite Junagadh not being contiguous with Pakistan.
2. Hyderabad (Hindu-majority state with a Muslim nizam)—Patel ordered the Indian army to depose the government of the Nizam, code-named Operation Polo, after the failure of negotiations, which was done between 13 and 29 September 1948. It was incorporated as a state of India the next year.
3. The state of Jammu and Kashmir (a Muslim-majority state with a Hindu king) in the far north of the subcontinent quickly became a source of controversy that erupted into the First Indo-Pakistani War which lasted from 1947 to 1949. Eventually, a United Nations-overseen ceasefire was agreed that left India in control of two-thirds of the contested region. Jawaharlal Nehru initially agreed to Mountbatten's proposal that a plebiscite be held in the entire state as soon as hostilities ceased, and a UN-sponsored cease-fire was agreed to by both parties on 1 January 1949. No statewide plebiscite was held, however, for in 1954, after Pakistan began to receive arms from the United States, Nehru withdrew his support. The Indian Constitution came into force in Kashmir on 26 January 1950 with special clauses for the state.

=== Constitution ===
The Constitution of India was adopted by the Constituent Assembly on 26 November 1949 and became effective on 26 January 1950. The constitution replaced the Government of India Act 1935 as the country's fundamental governing document, and the Dominion of India became the Republic of India. To ensure constitutional autochthony, its framers repealed prior acts of the British parliament in Article 395. The constitution declares India a sovereign, socialist, secular, and democratic republic, assures its citizens justice, equality, and liberty, and endeavours to promote fraternity. Key features of the constitution were Universal suffrage for all adults, Westminster style parliamentary system of government at the federal and state level, and independent judiciary. Indian judiciary continues to suffer pendency of court cases. The constitution also required the Union Government and the States and Territories of India to set reserved quotas or seats, at particular percentage in Education Admissions, Employments, Political Bodies, Promotions, etc., for "socially and educationally backward citizens." The constitution has had more than 100 amendments since it was enacted. India celebrates its constitution on 26 January as Republic Day.

=== Indo-Pakistani War of 1947–1948 ===
The Indo-Pakistani War of 1947–1948 was fought between India and Pakistan over the princely state of Kashmir and Jammu from 1947 to 1948. It was the first of four Indo-Pakistan Wars fought between the two newly independent nations. Pakistan precipitated the war a few weeks after independence by launching tribal lashkar (militia) from Waziristan, in an effort to secure Kashmir, the future of which hung in the balance. A United Nations-mediated ceasefire took place on 5 January 1949.

Indian losses in the war totalled 1,104 killed and 3,154 wounded; Pakistani, about 6,000 killed and 14,000 wounded. Neutral assessments state India emerged victorious as it successfully defended the majority of the contested territory.

== 1950s and 1960s under Nehru ==
India held its first national elections under the Constitution in 1952, where a turnout of over 60% was recorded. The Indian National Congress won an overwhelming majority, and Jawaharlal Nehru began a second term as prime minister. President Prasad was also elected to a second term by the electoral college of the first Parliament of India.

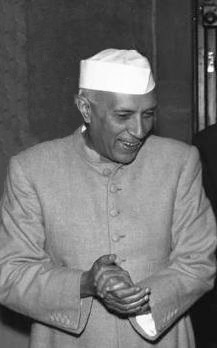
Jawaharlal Nehru, the first Prime Minister of India. He oversaw India's transition from a colony to a republic, while nurturing a plural, multi-party system. In foreign policy, he took a leading role in the Non-Aligned Movement while projecting India as a regional hegemon in South Asia.

=== Nehru administration (1952–1964) ===
Nehru can be regarded as the founder of the modern Indian state. Parekh attributes this to the national philosophy Nehru formulated for India. For him, modernisation was the national philosophy, with seven goals: national unity, parliamentary democracy, industrialisation, socialism, development of the scientific temper, and non-alignment in the Cold War. In Parekh's opinion, the philosophy and the policies that resulted from this benefited a large section of society such as public sector workers, industrial houses, and middle and upper peasantry. However, it failed to benefit or satisfy the urban and rural poor, the unemployed and the Hindu nationalists and fundamentalists.

The death of Vallabhbhai Patel in 1950 left Nehru as the sole remaining iconic national leader, and soon the situation became such that Nehru could implement his vision for India without hindrance.

Nehru implemented economic policies based on import substitution industrialisation and advocated a mixed economy where the government-controlled public sector would co-exist with the private sector. He believed the establishment of basic and heavy industry was fundamental to the development and modernisation of the Indian economy. The government, therefore, directed investment primarily into key public sector industries—steel, iron, coal, and power—promoting their development with subsidies and protectionist policies.

Nehru led the Congress to further election victories in 1957 and 1962. During his tenure, the Indian Parliament passed extensive reforms that increased the legal rights of women in Hindu society, and further legislated against caste discrimination and untouchability. Nehru advocated a strong initiative to enroll India's children to complete primary education, and thousands of schools, colleges and institutions of advanced learning, such as the Indian Institutes of Technology, were founded across the nation. Nehru advocated a socialist model for the economy of India. After India achieved independence, a formal model of planning was adopted, and accordingly the Planning Commission, reporting directly to the Prime Minister, was established in 1950, with Nehru as the chairman. The commission was tasked with formulating Five-Year Plans for economic development which were shaped by the Soviet model based on centralised and integrated national economic programs—no taxation for Indian farmers, minimum wage and benefits for blue-collar workers, and the nationalisation of heavy industries such as steel, aviation, shipping, electricity, and mining. Village common lands were seized, and an extensive public works and industrialisation campaign resulted in the construction of major dams, irrigation canals, roads, thermal and hydroelectric power stations, and many more.

South Indian states prior to the States Reorganisation Act

=== States reorganisation ===
Potti Sreeramulu's fast-unto-death, and consequent death for the demand of an Andhra State in 1952 sparked a major re-shaping of the Indian Union. Nehru appointed the States Re-organisation Commission, upon whose recommendations the States Reorganisation Act was passed in 1956. Old states were dissolved and new states created on the lines of shared linguistic and ethnic demographics. The separation of Kerala and the Telugu-speaking regions of Madras State enabled the creation of an exclusively Tamil-speaking state of Tamil Nadu. On 1 May 1960, the states of Maharashtra and Gujarat were created out of the bilingual Bombay State, and on 1 November 1966, the larger Punjab state was divided into the smaller, Punjabi-speaking Punjab and Haryanvi-speaking Haryana states.

=== Development of a multi-party system ===
In pre-independence India, the main parties were the Congress and the Muslim League. There were also many other parties such as the Hindu Mahasabha, Justice Party, the Akali Dal, the Communist Party etc. during this period with limited or regional appeal. With the eclipse of the Muslim League due to partition, the Congress party was able to dominate Indian politics during the 1950s. This started breaking down during the 60s and 70s.This period saw formation of many new parties. These included those founded by former Congress leaders such as the Swatantra party, many Socialist leaning parties, and the Bharatiya Jan Sangh, the political arm of the Hindu nationalist RSS.

==== Swatantra Party ====
On 4 June 1959, shortly after the Nagpur session of the Indian National Congress, C. Rajagopalachari, along with Murari Vaidya of the newly established Forum of Free Enterprise (FFE) and Minoo Masani, a classical liberal and critic of socialist leaning Nehru, announced the formation of the new Swatantra Party at a meeting in Madras. Conceived by disgruntled heads of former princely states such as the Raja of Ramgarh, the Maharaja of Kalahandi and the Maharajadhiraja of Darbhanga, the party was conservative in character. Later, N. G. Ranga, K. M. Munshi, Field Marshal K. M. Cariappa and the Maharaja of Patiala joined the effort. Rajagopalachari, Masani and Ranga also tried but failed to involve Jayaprakash Narayan in the initiative.

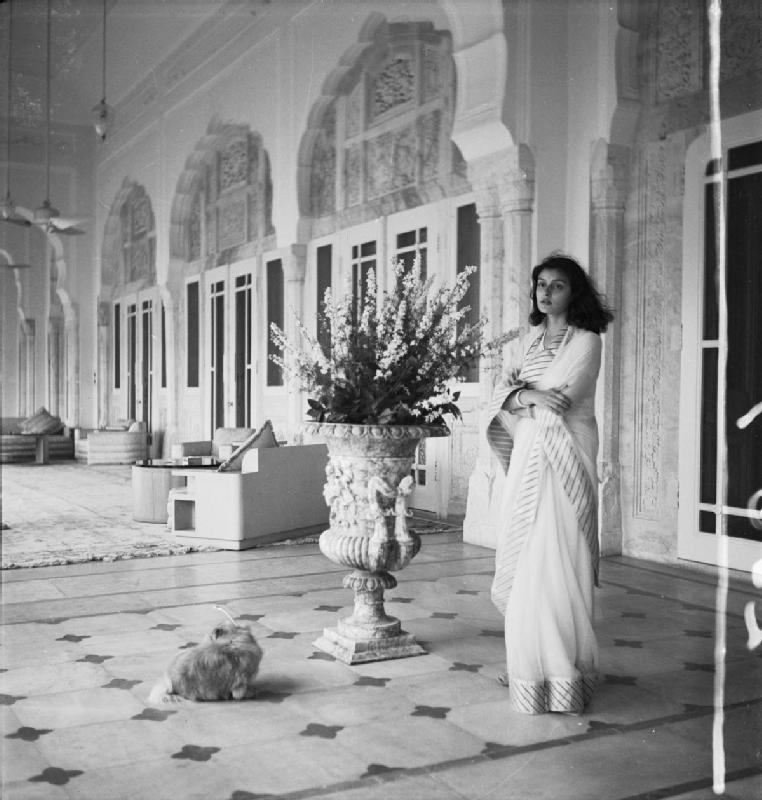
Gayatri Devi, the Maharani of Jaipur and princess of Cooch Behar, was a successful politician in the Swatantra Party.

In his short essay "Our Democracy", Rajagopalachari argued the necessity of a right-wing alternative to the Congress: "since ... the Congress Party has swung to the Left, what is wanted is not an ultra or outer-Left [viz. the CPI or the Praja Socialist Party, PSP], but a strong and articulate Right." Rajagopalachari also said the opposition must: "operate not privately and behind the closed doors of the party meeting, but openly and periodically through the electorate." He outlined the goals of the Swatantra Party through twenty-one "fundamental principles" in the foundation document. The party stood for equality and opposed government control over the private sector. Rajagopalachari sharply criticised the bureaucracy and coined the term "licence-permit Raj" to describe Nehru's elaborate system of permissions and licences required for an individual to set up a private enterprise. Rajagopalachari's personality became a rallying point for the party.

Rajagopalachari's efforts to build an anti-Congress front led to a patch-up with his former adversary C. N. Annadurai of the Dravida Munnetra Kazhagam. During the late 1950s and early 1960s, Annadurai grew close to Rajagopalachari and sought an alliance with the Swatantra Party for the 1962 Madras Legislative Assembly elections. Although there were occasional electoral pacts between the Swatantra Party and the Dravida Munnetra Kazhagam (DMK), Rajagopalachari remained non-committal on a formal tie-up with the DMK due to its existing alliance with Communists whom he dreaded. The Swatantra Party contested 94 seats in the Madras state assembly elections and won six as well as won 18 parliamentary seats in the 1962 Lok Sabha elections.

=== Foreign policy and military conflicts ===
Nehru's foreign policy was the inspiration of the Non-Aligned Movement, of which India was a co-founder. Nehru maintained friendly relations with both the United States and the Soviet Union, and encouraged the People's Republic of China to join the global community of nations. In 1956, when the Suez Canal Company was seized by the Egyptian government, an international conference voted 18–4 to take action against Egypt. India was one of the four backers of Egypt, along with Indonesia, Sri Lanka, and the USSR. India had opposed the partition of Palestine and the 1956 invasion of the Sinai by Israel, the United Kingdom and France, but did not oppose the Chinese direct control over Tibet, and the suppression of a pro-democracy movement in Hungary by the Soviet Union. Although Nehru disavowed nuclear ambitions for India, Canada and France aided India in the development of nuclear power stations for electricity. India also negotiated an agreement in 1960 with Pakistan on the just use of the waters of seven rivers shared by the countries. Nehru had visited Pakistan in 1953, but owing to political turmoil in Pakistan, no headway was made on the Kashmir dispute.

India has fought a total of four wars/military conflicts with its neighbouring rival state Pakistan, two in this period. In the Indo-Pakistani War of 1947, fought over the disputed territory of Kashmir, Pakistan captured one-third of Kashmir (which India claims as its territory), and India captured three-fifths (which Pakistan claims as its territory). In the Indo-Pakistani War of 1965, India attacked Pakistan on all fronts by crossing the international border after attempts by Pakistani troops to infiltrate Indian-controlled Kashmir by crossing the de facto border between India and Pakistan in Kashmir.

In 1961, after continual petitions for a peaceful handover, India invaded and annexed the Portuguese colony of Goa on the west coast of India.

=== Sino Indian War ===
In 1962 China and India engaged in the brief Sino-Indian War over the border in the Himalayas. The war was a complete rout for the Indians and led to a refocusing on arms build-up and an improvement in relations with the United States. China withdrew from disputed territory in the contested Chinese South Tibet and Indian North-East Frontier Agency that it crossed during the war. India disputes China's sovereignty over the smaller Aksai Chin territory that it controls on the western part of the Sino-Indian border.

=== Sino-Pakistan Agreement ===
On 2 March 1963, Pakistan and China signed the Sino-Pakistan Agreement ceding 5180 sq kms of Kashmir (i.e. Shaksgam Valley) to China which India declared as illegal and violation of India's sovereignty and territorial integrity.

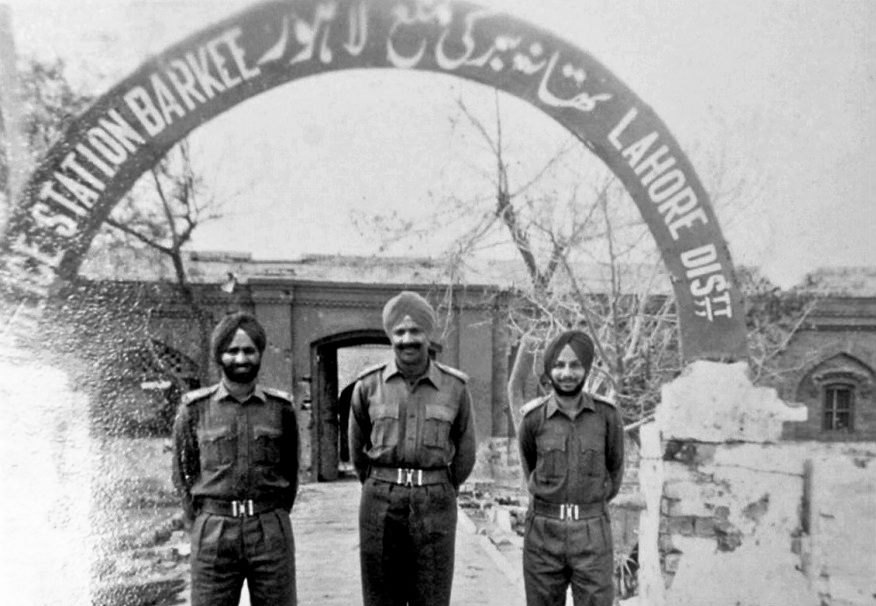
Indian Army officers of the 4th Sikh Regiment captured a Police Station in Lahore, Pakistan, after winning the Battle of Burki, during the Indo-Pakistani War of 1965.

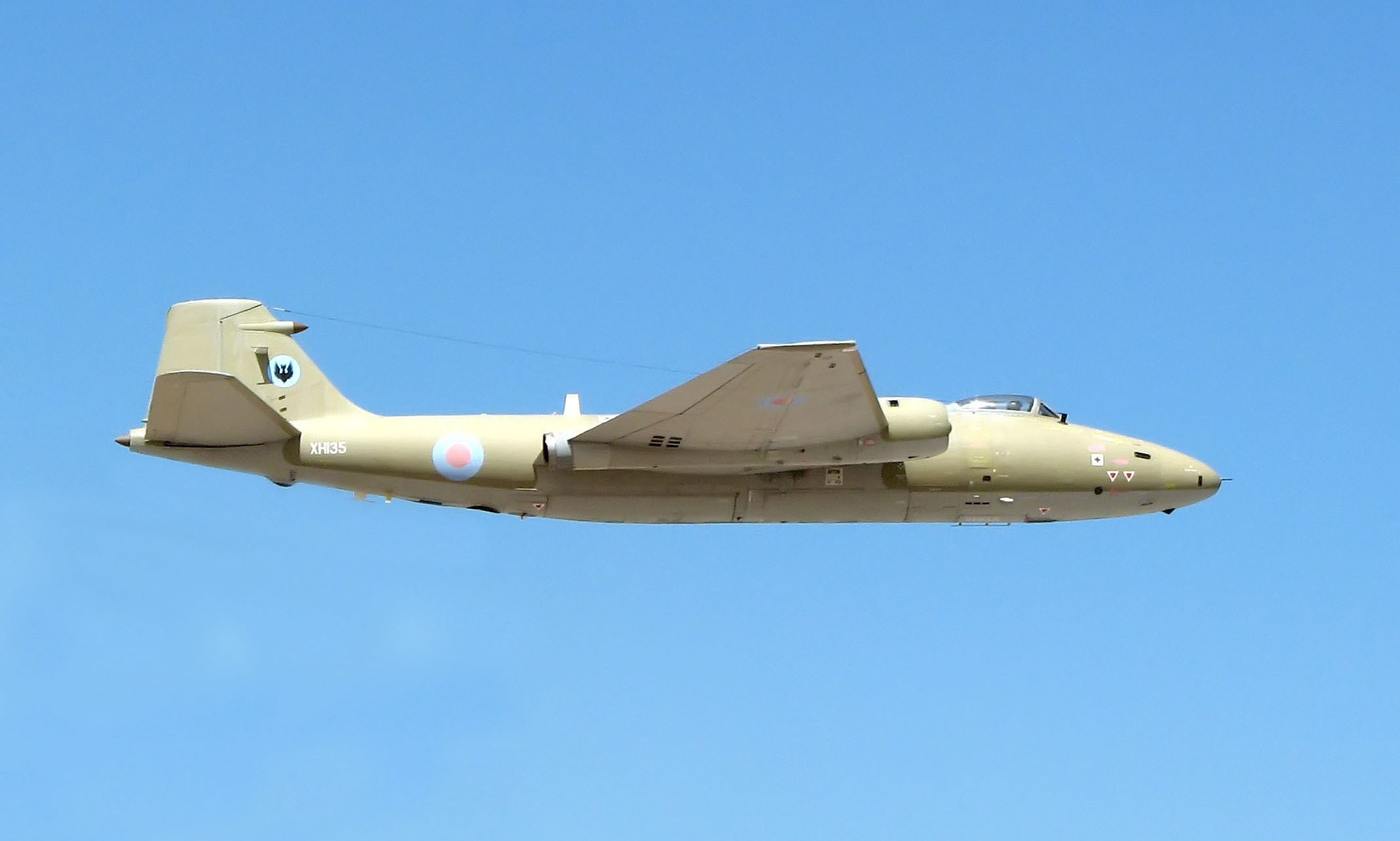
The Indian Air Force used 20 small and lightweight Canberra bombers against the Portuguese forces during Operation Vijay, which led to the Annexation of Goa.

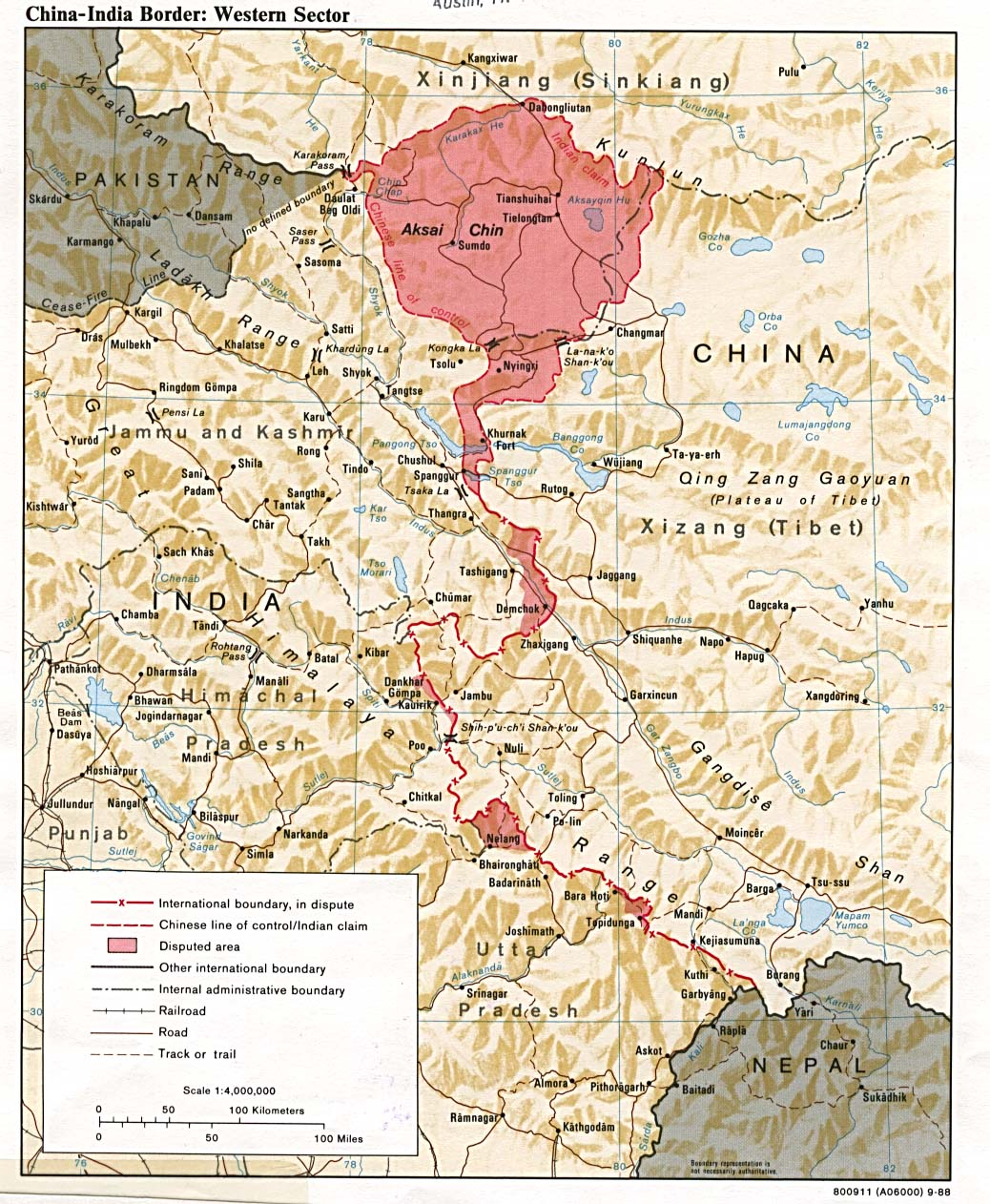
Disputed areas in the western sector of the Sino-Indian border including Aksai Chin, 1988 CIA map

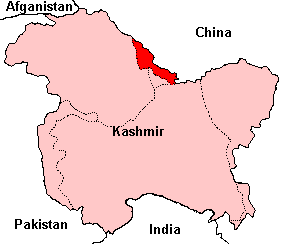
Map of Shaksgam Valley

== 1960s after Nehru ==
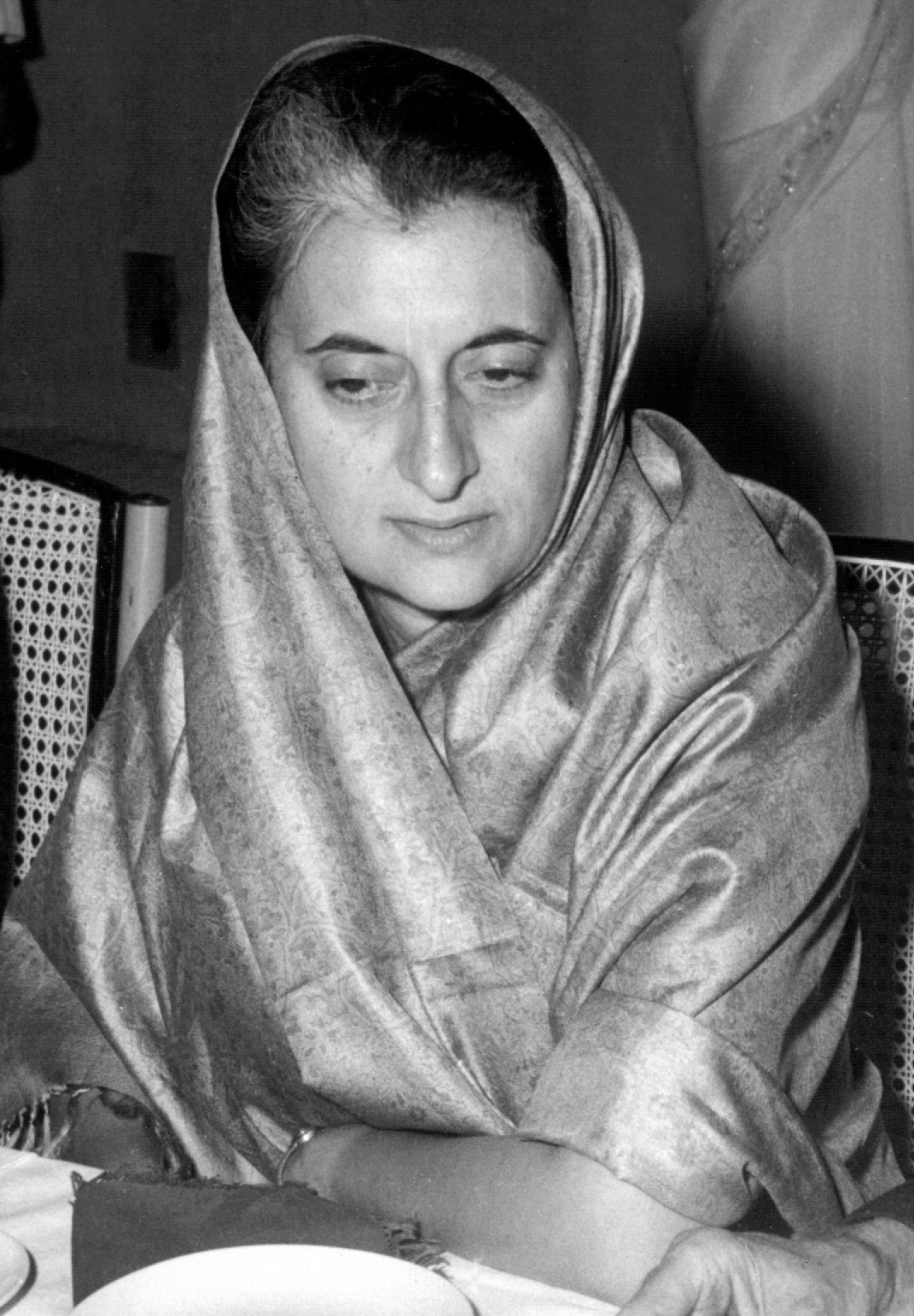
Nehru's daughter Indira Gandhi served as prime minister for three consecutive terms (1966–77) and a fourth term (1980–84).

Jawaharlal Nehru died on 27 May 1964, and Lal Bahadur Shastri succeeded him as prime minister. In 1965, India and Pakistan again went to war over Kashmir, but without any definitive outcome or alteration of the Kashmir boundary. The Tashkent Agreement was signed under the mediation of the Soviet government, but Shastri died on the night after the signing ceremony. A leadership election resulted in the elevation of Indira Gandhi, Nehru's daughter who had been serving as Minister for Information and Broadcasting, as the third prime minister. She defeated right-wing leader Morarji Desai. The Congress Party won a reduced majority in the 1967 elections owing to widespread disenchantment over rising prices of commodities, unemployment, economic stagnation, and food crisis. Indira Gandhi had started on a rocky note after agreeing to a devaluation of the rupee, which created much hardship for Indian businesses and consumers, and the import of wheat from the United States fell through due to political disputes.

In 1967, India and China again engaged with each other in Sino-Indian War of 1967 after the PLA soldiers opened fire on the Indian soldiers who were making a fence on the border in Nathu La. The Indian forces successfully repelled Chinese forces and the outcome saw Chinese defeat with their withdrawal from Sikkim.

Morarji Desai entered Gandhi's government as deputy prime minister and finance minister, and with senior Congress politicians attempted to constrain Gandhi's authority. But following the counsel of her political advisor P. N. Haksar, Gandhi resuscitated her popular appeal by a major shift towards socialist policies. She successfully ended the Privy Purse guarantee for former Indian royalty, and waged a major offensive against party hierarchy over the nationalisation of India's banks. Although resisted by Desai and India's business community, the policy was popular with the masses. When Congress politicians attempted to oust Gandhi by suspending her Congress membership, Gandhi was empowered with a large exodus of members of parliament to her own Congress (R). The bastion of the Indian freedom struggle, the Indian National Congress, had split in 1969. Gandhi continued to govern with a slim majority.

== 1970s ==
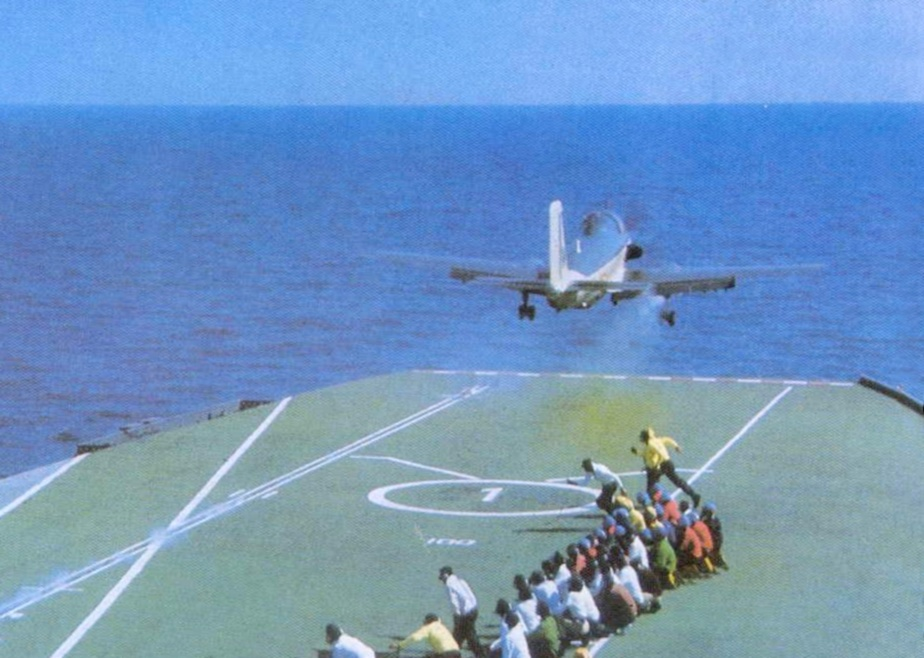
Indian aircraft carrier INS Vikrant launches an Alize aircraft during the Indo-Pakistani War of 1971.

In 1971, Indira Gandhi and her Congress (R) were returned to power with a massively increased majority. The nationalisation of banks was carried out, and many other socialist economic and industrial policies enacted. India intervened in the Bangladesh War of Independence, a civil war taking place in Pakistan's Bengali half, after millions of refugees had fled the persecution of the Pakistani army. The clash resulted in the independence of East Pakistan, which became known as Bangladesh, and Prime Minister Indira Gandhi's elevation to immense popularity. Relations with the United States grew strained, and India signed a 20-year treaty of friendship with the Soviet Union—breaking explicitly for the first time from non-alignment. In 1974, India tested its first nuclear weapon in the desert of Rajasthan, near Pokhran.

On 2 July 1972, India and Pakistan signed a bilateral peace treaty and framework agreement known as the Shimla Agreement in Shimla, Himachal Pradesh following Pakistan's defeat in the 1971 war and the creation of Bangladesh.

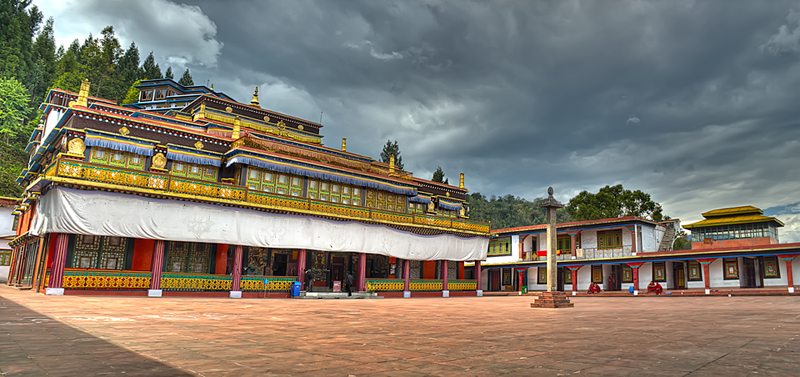
Rumtek Monastery in Sikkim. Sikkim became the 22nd state of the Indian Union.

=== Merger of Sikkim ===
In 1973, anti-royalist riots took place in the Kingdom of Sikkim. In 1975, the Prime Minister of Sikkim appealed to the Indian Parliament for Sikkim to become a state of India. In April of that year, the Indian Army took over the city of Gangtok and disarmed the Chogyal's palace guards. Thereafter, a referendum was held in which 97.5 percent of voters supported abolishing the monarchy, effectively approving union with India.

India is said to have stationed 20,000–40,000 troops in a country of only 200,000 during the referendum. On 16 May 1975, Sikkim became the 22nd state of the Indian Union, and the monarchy was abolished. To enable the incorporation of the new state, the Indian Parliament amended the Indian Constitution. First, the 35th Amendment laid down a set of conditions that made Sikkim an "associate state", a special designation not used by any other state. A month later, the 36th Amendment repealed the 35th Amendment, and made Sikkim a full state, adding its name to the First Schedule of the Constitution.

=== Formation of Northeastern states ===
In the Northeast India, the state of Assam was divided into several states beginning in 1970 within the borders of what was then Assam. In 1963, the Naga Hills district became the 16th state of India under the name of Nagaland. Part of Tuensang was added to Nagaland. In 1970, in response to the demands of the Khasi, Jaintia and Garo people of the Meghalaya Plateau, the districts embracing the Khasi Hills, Jaintia Hills, and Garo Hills were formed into an autonomous state within Assam; in 1972 this became a separate state under the name of Meghalaya. In 1972, Arunachal Pradesh (the North-East Frontier Agency) and Mizoram (from the Mizo Hills in the south) were separated from Assam as union territories; both became states in 1986.

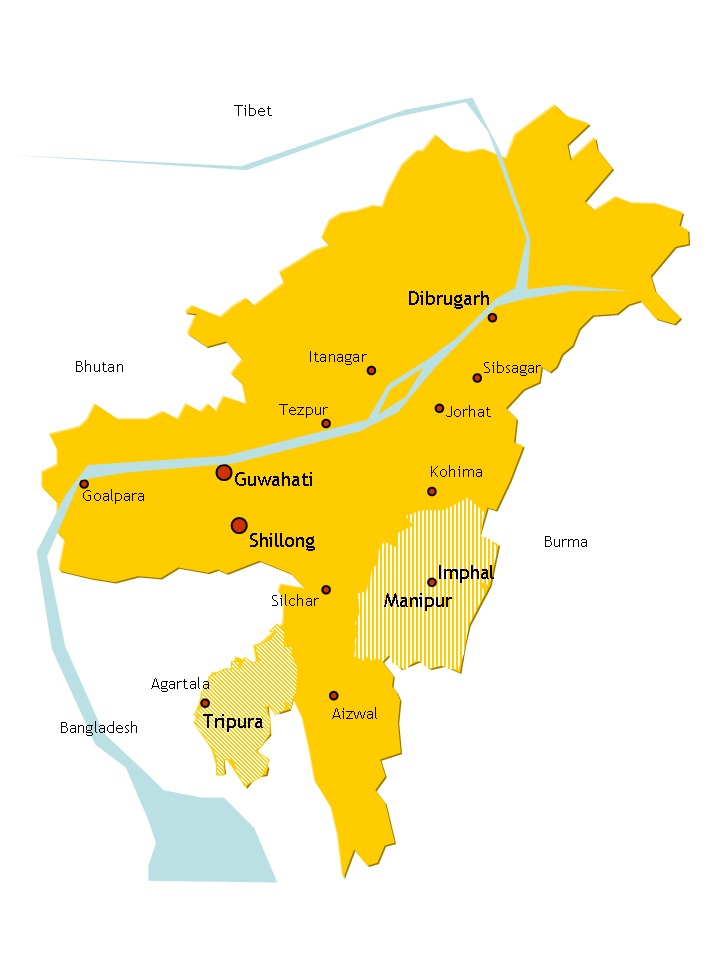
Assam till the 1950s: The new states of Nagaland, Meghalaya and Mizoram formed in the 1960-70s. From Shillong, the capital of Assam was shifted to Dispur, now a part of Guwahati. After the Sino-Indian War in 1962, Arunachal Pradesh was also separated.

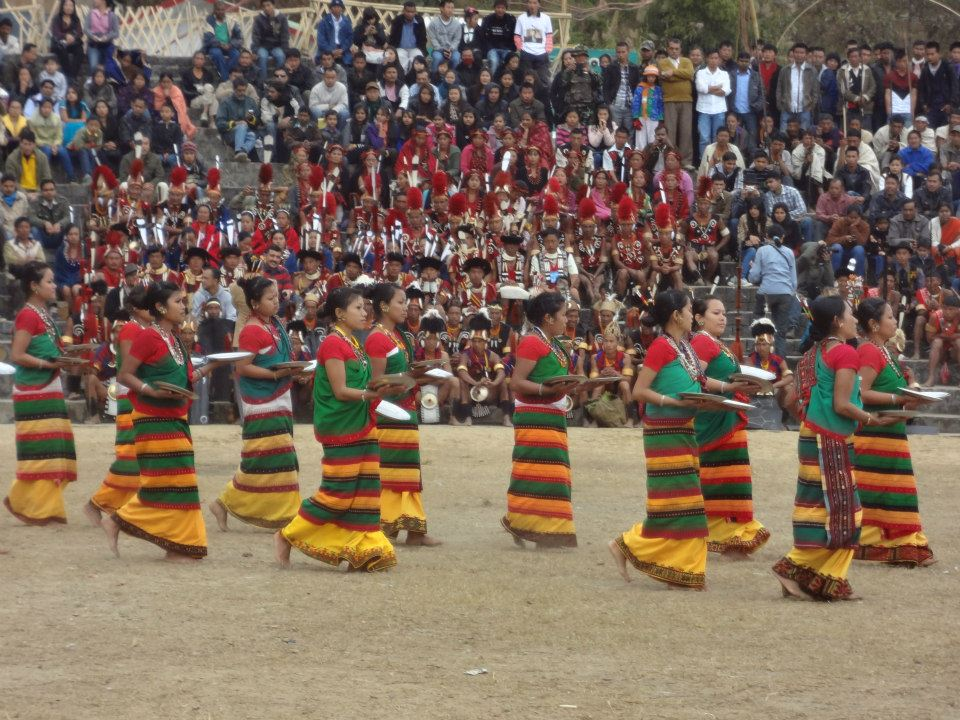
Hornbill Festival, Kohima, Nagaland. Nagaland became a state on 1 December 1963.

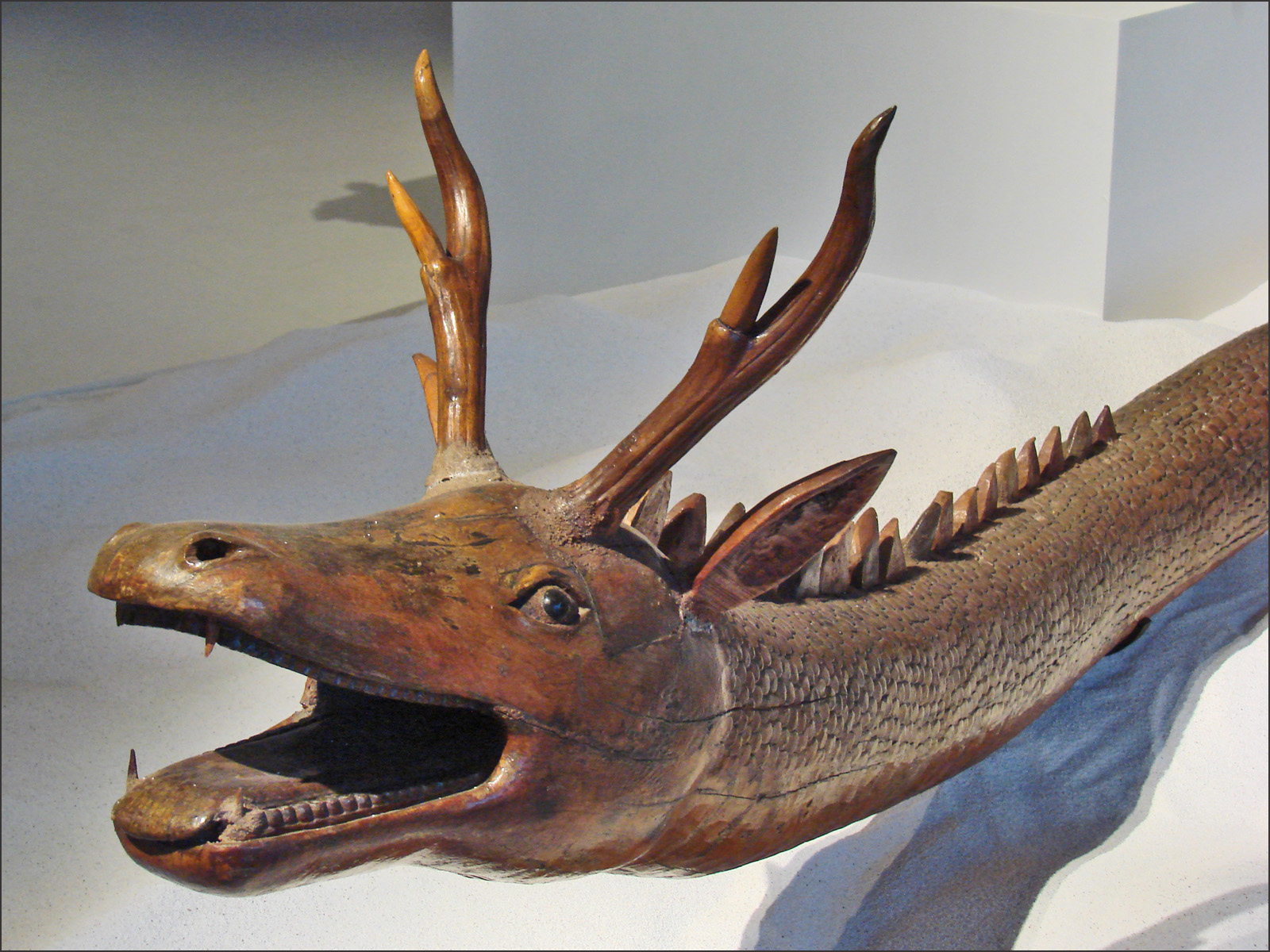
Pakhangba, a heraldic dragon of the Meithei tradition and an important emblem among Manipur state symbols. Manipur became a state on 21 January 1972.

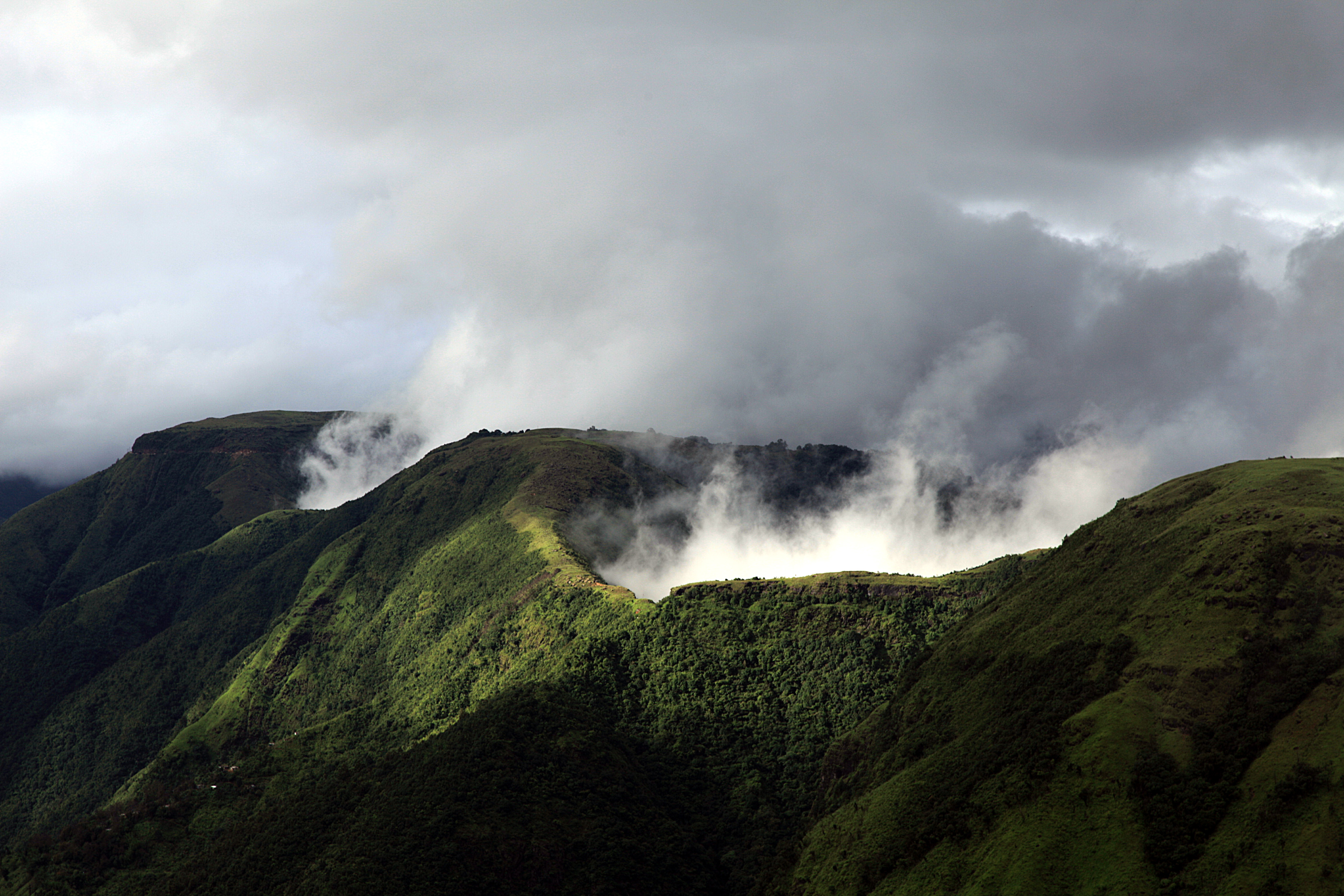
Meghalaya is mountainous, the most rain-soaked state of India. Meghalaya became a state on 21 January 1972.

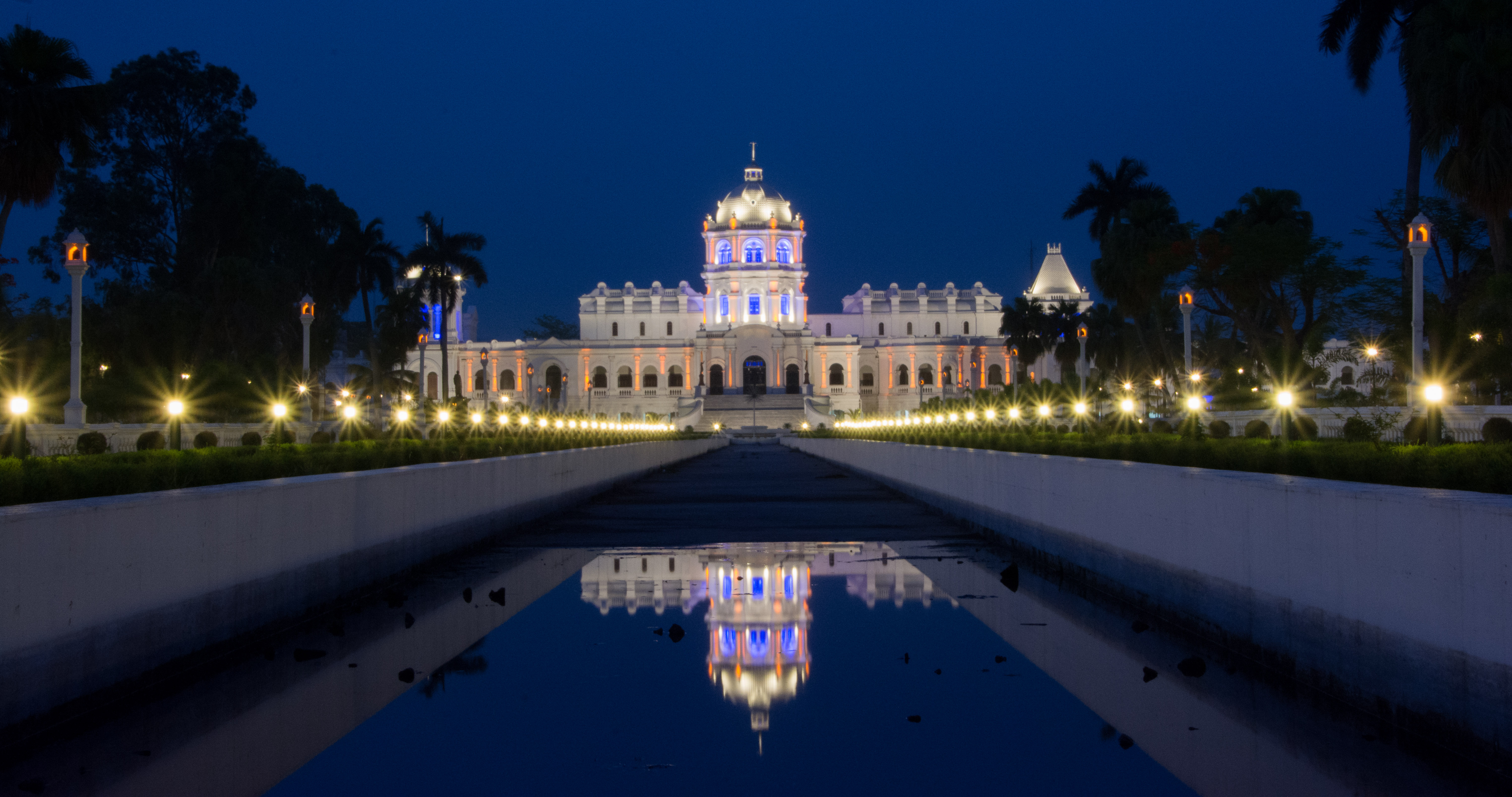
Ujjayanta Palace, which houses the Tripura State Museum. Tripura became a state on 21 January 1972.

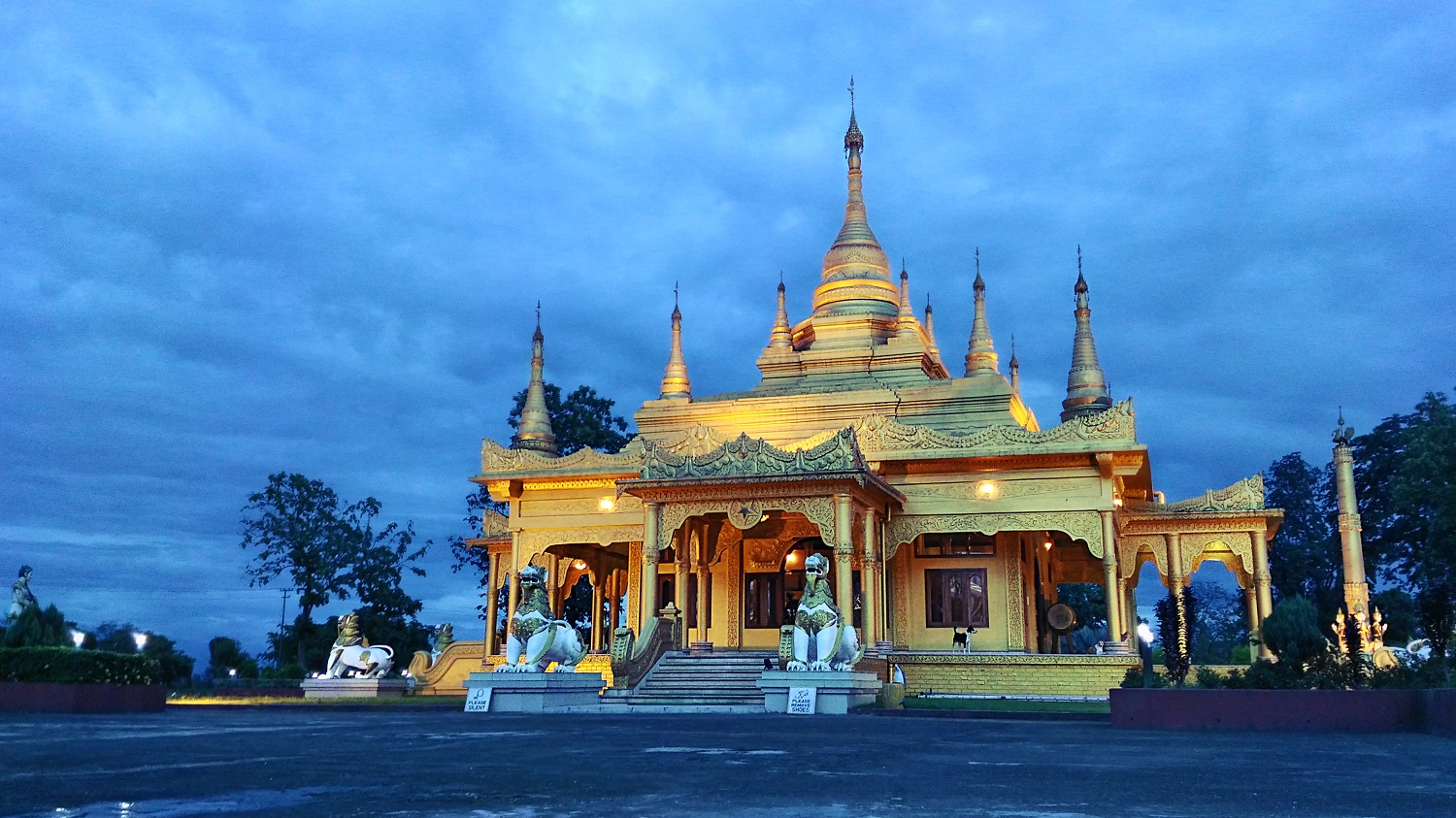
Golden Pagoda, Namsai, Arunachal Pradesh, is one of the notable Buddhist temples in India. Arunachal Pradesh became a state on 20 February 1987.

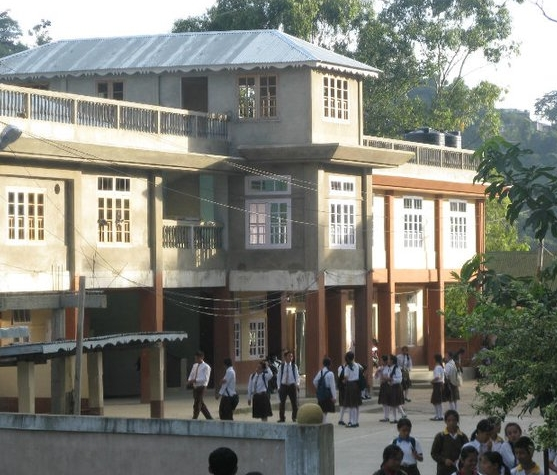
A school campus in Mizoram, which has one of the highest literacy rates in India. Mizoram became a state on 20 February 1987.

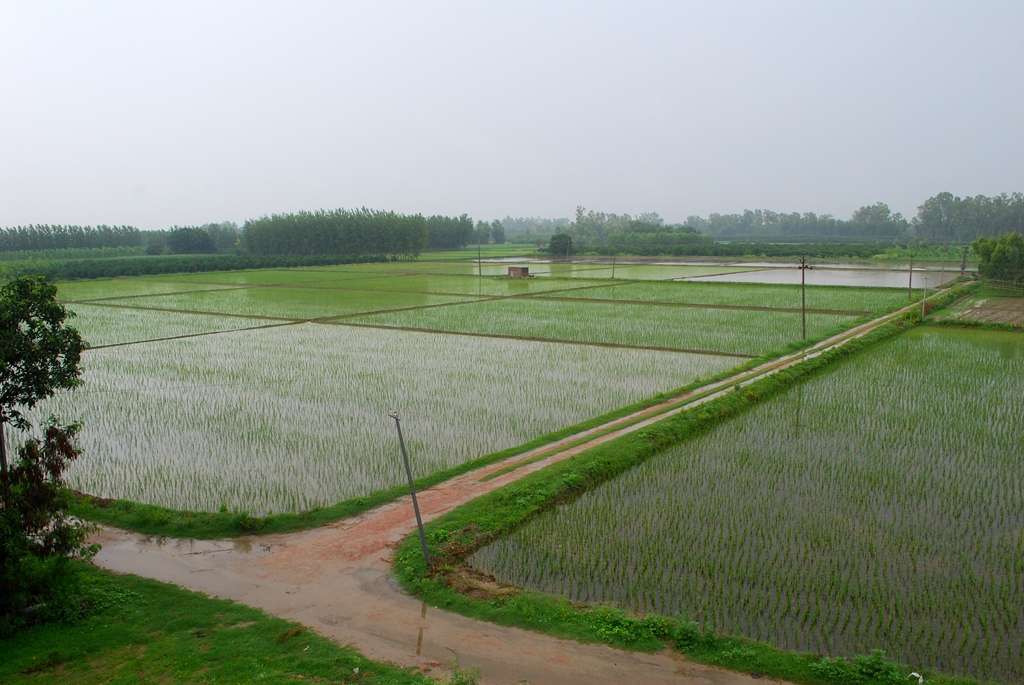
The state of Punjab led India's Green Revolution and earned the distinction of being the country's bread basket.

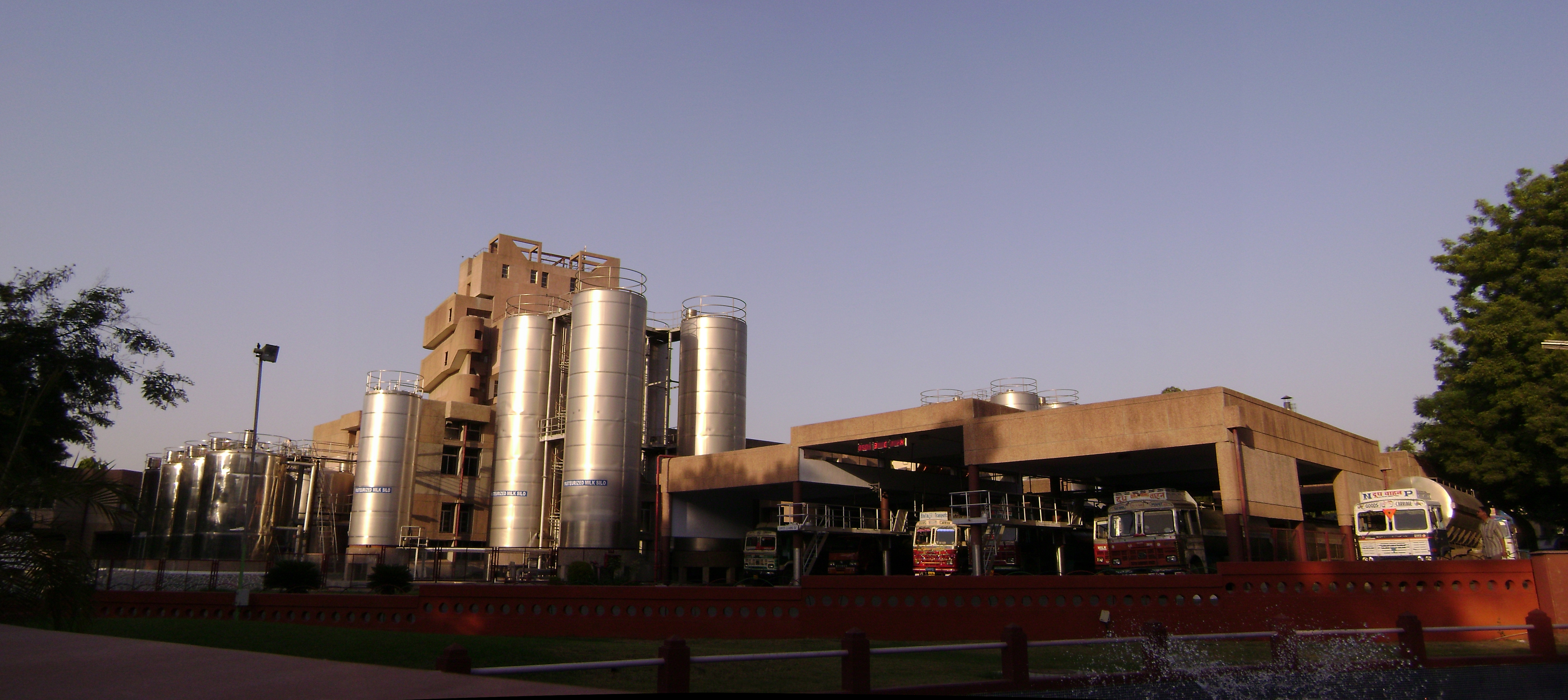
Amul Dairy Plant at Anand, Gujarat, was a highly successful co-operative started during Operation Flood in the 1970s.

=== Green revolution and Operation Flood ===
India's population passed the 500 million mark in the early 1970s, but its long-standing food crisis was resolved with greatly improved agricultural productivity due to the Green Revolution. The government sponsored modern agricultural implements, new varieties of generic seeds, and increased financial assistance to farmers that increased the yield of food crops such as wheat, rice and corn, as well as commercial crops like cotton, tea, tobacco and coffee. Increased agricultural productivity expanded across the states of the Indo-Gangetic Plain and the Punjab.

Under Operation Flood, the government encouraged the production of milk, which increased greatly, and improved rearing of livestock across India. This enabled India to become self-sufficient in feeding its own population, ending two decades of food imports.

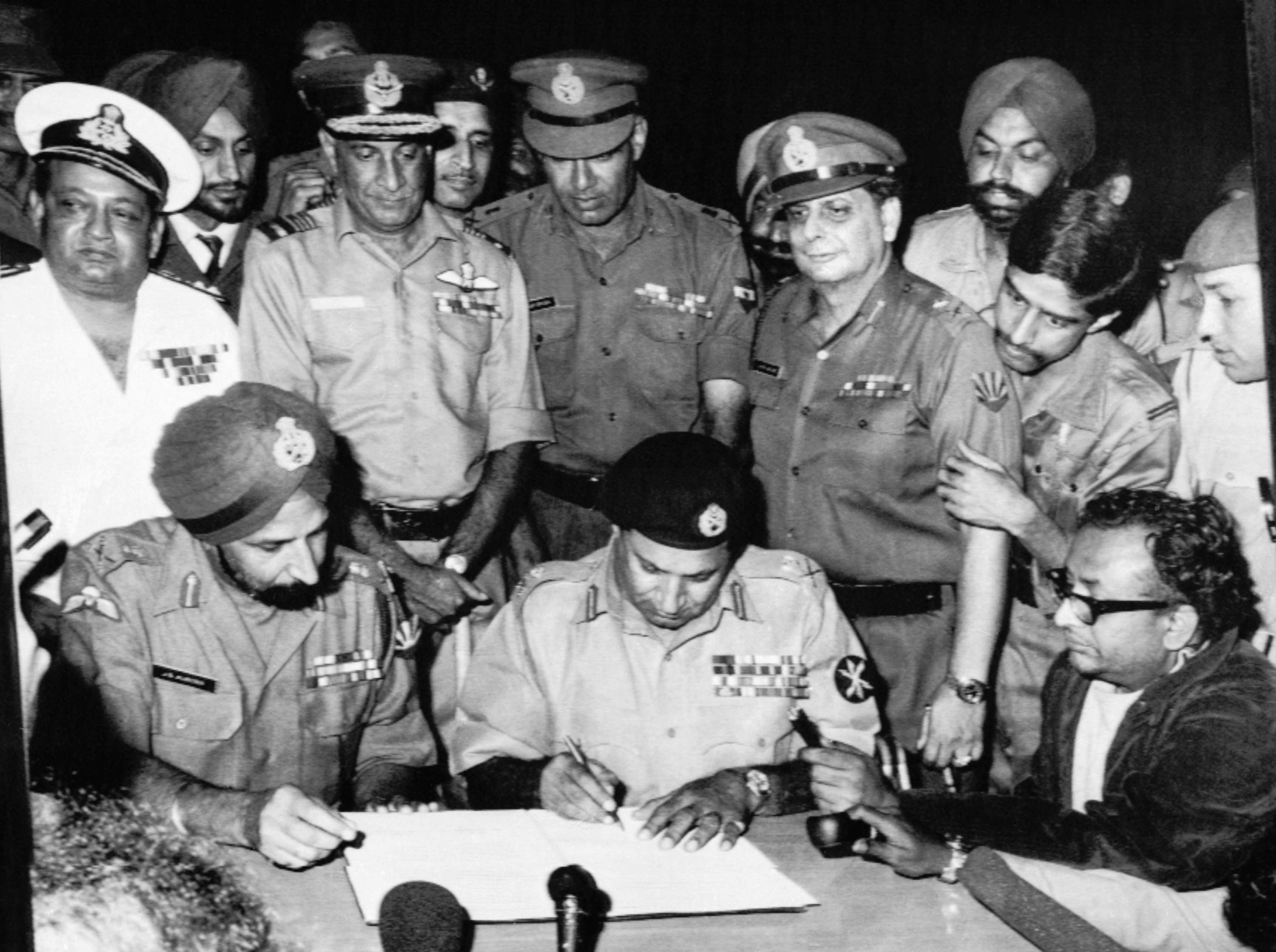
The Indo-Pakistani War of 1971 concluded with Lieutenant-General A. A. K. Niazi, the commander of Pakistan Eastern Command, signing the instrument of surrender in Dhaka on 16 December 1971, in the presence of India's Lt. Gen. Jagjit Singh Aurora. Standing immediately behind from left to right: Indian Navy Vice Admiral Krishnan, Indian Air Force Air Marshal Dewan, Indian Army Lt Gen Sagat Singh, Maj Gen JFR Jacob (with Flt Lt Krishnamurthy peering over his shoulder). Veteran newscaster Surojit Sen of All India Radio is seen holding a microphone on the right.

=== Bangladesh Liberation War ===
The Indo-Pakistani War of 1971 was the third in four wars fought between the two nations. The war was fought in December 1971 over the issue of Bangladesh. India decisively defeated Pakistan, resulting in the creation of Bangladesh.

The crisis started with Punjabi dominated Pakistani army refusing to surrender power to the newly elected but mainly Bengali Awami League led by Shaikh Mujibur Rehman. Proclamation of Bangladeshi Independence in march of 1971 by Rehman led to widespread atrocities being committed by the Pakistani army against select groups. It is estimated that starting in March 1971, members of the Pakistani military and supporting pro-Pakistani Islamist militias killed between 300,000 and 3,000,000 civilians in Bangladesh. During the conflict, members of the Pakistani military and supporting pro-Pakistani Islamist militias called the Razakars raped between 200,000 and 400,000 Bangladeshi women and girls in a systematic campaign of genocidal rape. The murders and rapes led to an estimated eight to ten million people to flee East Pakistan to seek refuge in India.

Official de-jure war began with Pakistan airforce-affiliated Operation Chengiz Khan, which consisted of preemptive aerial strikes on 11 Indian air stations resulting in minor damages and suspension of counter-air operations for mere few hours. The strikes led to India declaring war on Pakistan, marking their entry into the war for East Pakistan's independence, on the side of Bengali nationalist forces. India's entry expanded the existing conflict with Indian and Pakistani forces engaging on both the eastern and western fronts. Thirteen days into the war, India had achieved total superiority into the East meanwhile it had sufficient superiority in the West, which resulted later in Eastern defence of Pakistan to sign a joint instrument of surrender. on 16 December 1971 in Dhaka, ending conflict officially and marking the formation of East Pakistan as the new nation of Bangladesh. Approximately 93,000 Pakistani servicemen were taken prisoner by the Indian Army, which included 79,676 to 81,000 uniformed personnel of the Pakistan Armed Forces, including some Bengali soldiers who had remained loyal to Pakistan. The remaining 10,324 to 12,500 prisoners were civilians, either family members of the military personnel or collaborators (Razakars).

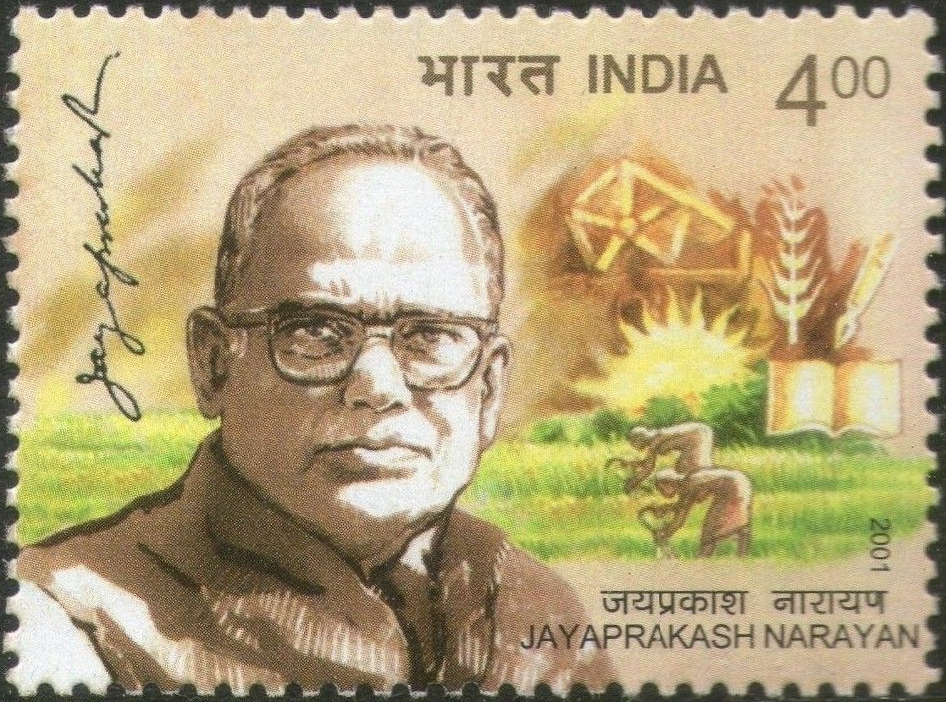
Jayaprakash Narayan on a 2001 stamp of India. He is remembered for leading the mid-1970s opposition against Prime Minister Indira Gandhi and the Indian Emergency, for whose overthrow he had called for a "total revolution".

=== Indian Emergency ===
==== Prelude to the Emergency ====
India in the first half of the 1970s faced high inflation caused by the 1973 oil crisis which resulted in cost of oil imports to rise substantially, the cost of the Bangladesh war and the refugee resettlement, and food shortages caused by droughts in parts of the country. The economic and social problems caused by high inflation, as well as allegations of corruption against Indira Gandhi and her government, caused increasing political unrest across India during 1973–74. This included the Railway Strike in 1974, the Maoist Naxalite movement, the Bihar student agitations, the United Women's Anti- Price Rise Front in Maharashtra and the Nav Nirman movement in Gujarat.

Raj Narain was the Samyukta Socialist Party Candidate and Indira's opponent in the 1971 Lok Sabha elections from Rai Bareli. Although he suffered a defeat from her in 1971 elections, he accused Indira Gandhi of corrupt electoral practices and filed an election petition against her. Four years later on 12 June 1975, the Allahabad High Court gave their verdict, and found Indira Gandhi guilty of misusing government machinery for election purposes. Opposition parties conducted nationwide strikes and protests demanding her immediate resignation. Various political parties united under Jaya Prakash Narayan to resist what he termed Gandhi's dictatorship. Leading strikes across India that paralysed its economy and administration, Narayan even called for the Army to oust Gandhi.

==== Declaration of the emergency ====
On 25 June 1975, Gandhi advised President Fakhruddin Ali Ahmed to declare a state of emergency under the constitution, which allowed the central government to assume sweeping powers to defend law and order in the nation. Explaining the breakdown of law and order and threat to national security as her primary reasons, Gandhi suspended many civil liberties and postponed elections at national and state levels. Non-Congress governments in Indian states were dismissed, and nearly 1,000 opposition political leaders and activists were imprisoned. Her government also introduced a contentious programme of compulsory birth control. Strikes and public protests were outlawed in all forms.

On 10 November 1976, the Indira Gandhi government passed the controversial 42nd amendment of the Indian Constitution during the Emergency which amended many parts of the constitution including the Preamble. It gave full authority to the Prime Minister's Office and Parliament to amend any parts of the constitution. It also stripped the Judiciary's role to pronounce the validity of laws. The Supreme Court of India in a landmark judgement Minerva Mills v. Union of India struck down two provisions Section 4 & 55 of this act as unconstitutional on 31 July 1980.

==== Life during the emergency ====
India's economy benefited from an end to paralysing strikes and political disorder. India announced a 20-point programme which enhanced agricultural and industrial production, increasing national growth, productivity, and job growth. But many organs of government and many Congress politicians were accused of corruption and authoritarian conduct. Police officers were accused of arresting and torturing innocent people. Indira's then twentynine year old son, and unofficial political advisor, Sanjay Gandhi, was accused of committing gross excesses—Sanjay was blamed for the Health Ministry carrying out forced vasectomies of men and sterilisation of women as a part of the initiative to control population growth, and for the demolition of slums in Delhi near the Turkmen Gate, which left hundreds of people dead or injured, and many more displaced.

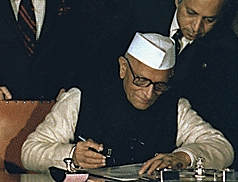
Morarji Desai, the first non-Congress Prime Minister of India, signing the "New Delhi" declaration during a visit by US President Jimmy Carter.

=== Janata interlude ===
Indira Gandhi's Congress Party called for general elections in 1977, only to suffer a humiliating electoral defeat at the hands of the Janata Party, an amalgamation of opposition parties. Morarji Desai became the first non-Congress Prime Minister of India. The Desai administration established tribunals to investigate Emergency-era abuses, and Indira and Sanjay Gandhi were arrested after a report from the Shah Commission.

In economic policy the Janata government had lesser success in achieving economic reforms. It launched the Sixth Five-Year Plan, aiming to boost agricultural production and rural industries. Seeking to promote economic self-reliance and indigenous industries, the government required multi-national corporations to go into partnership with Indian corporations. The policy proved controversial, diminishing foreign investment and led to the high-profile exit of corporations such as Coca-Cola and IBM from India.

The Janata party government under Morarji Desai Desai restored normal relations with China, for the first time since their war in 1962. Desai also established friendlier relationship with the military ruler of Pakistan, General Zia-ul-Haq. Despite his pacifist leanings, Desai refused to sign the non-nuclear proliferation treaty despite the threat of stopping supply of uranium for power plants by the United States Congress.

In 1979, the Janata coalition crumbled and Charan Singh formed an interim government. The Janata Party had become intensely unpopular due to its internecine warfare, and a perceived lack of leadership on solving India's serious economic and social problems.

== 1980s ==
Indira Gandhi and her Congress Party splinter group, the Indian National Congress or simply "Congress(I)", were swept back into power with a large majority in January 1980.

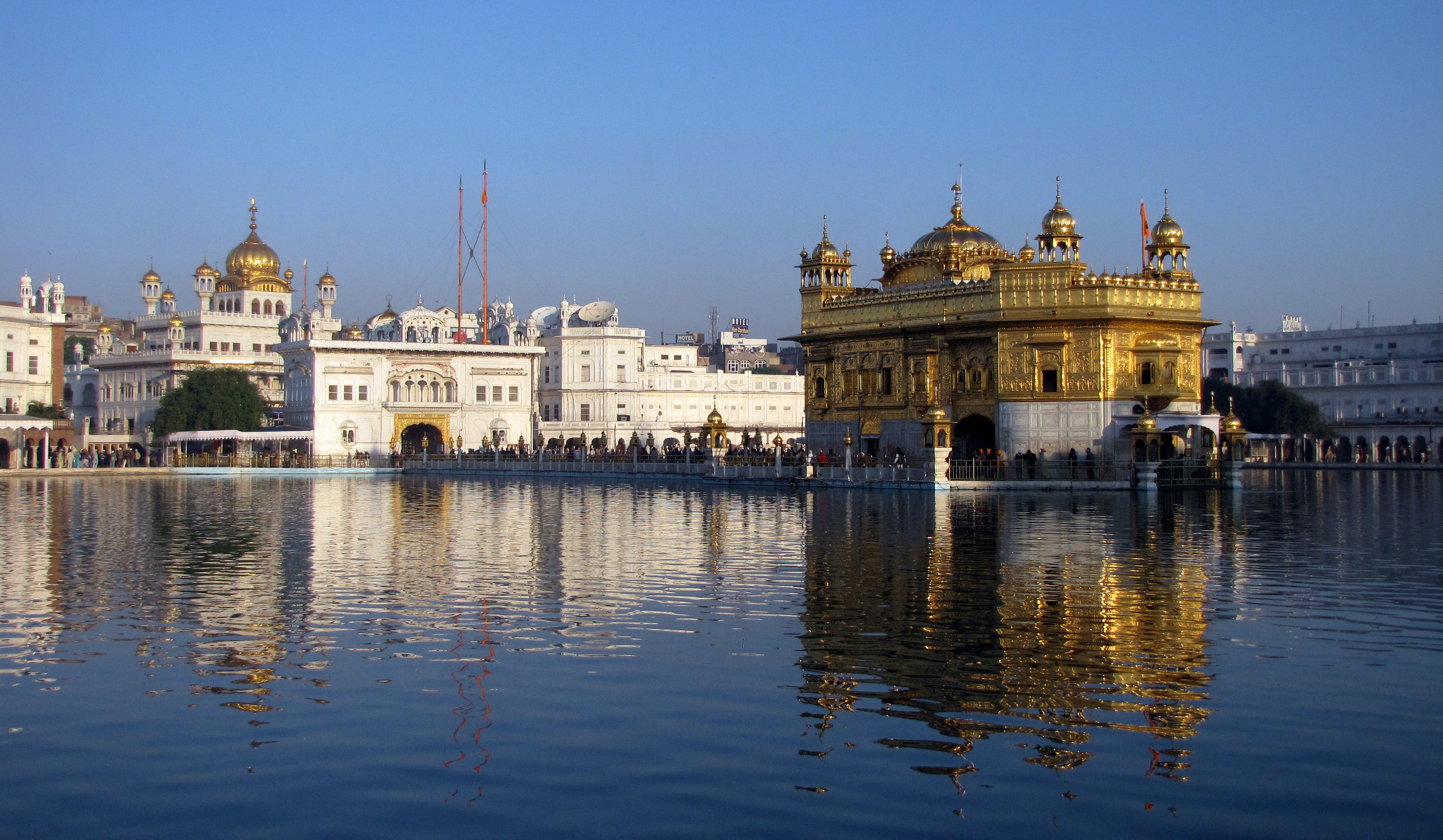
Akal Takht and Harmandir Sahib (Golden Temple), was repaired by the Indian Government after Operation Blue Star.

The rise of an insurgency in Punjab would jeopardise India's security. In Assam, there were many incidents of communal violence between native villagers and refugees from Bangladesh, as well as settlers from other parts of India. When Indian forces, undertaking Operation Blue Star, raided the hideout of self-rule pressing Khalistan militants in the Golden Temple — Sikhs' most holy shrine – in Amritsar, the inadvertent deaths of civilians and damage to the temple building inflamed tensions in the Sikh community across India. The Government used intensive police operations to crush militant operations, but it resulted in many claims of abuse of civil liberties. North-east India was paralysed owing to the ULFA's clash with Government forces.

=== Siachen conflict ===
On 13 April 1984, India successfully captured 1000 sq kms of Siachen Glacier as a part of Operation Meghdoot and continued with Operation Rajiv until 1987. India took control of the 70 km long Siachen Glacier and its tributary glaciers, as well as all the passes and heights of the Saltoro Ridge immediately west of the glacier including Sia La, Bilafond La and Gyong La.

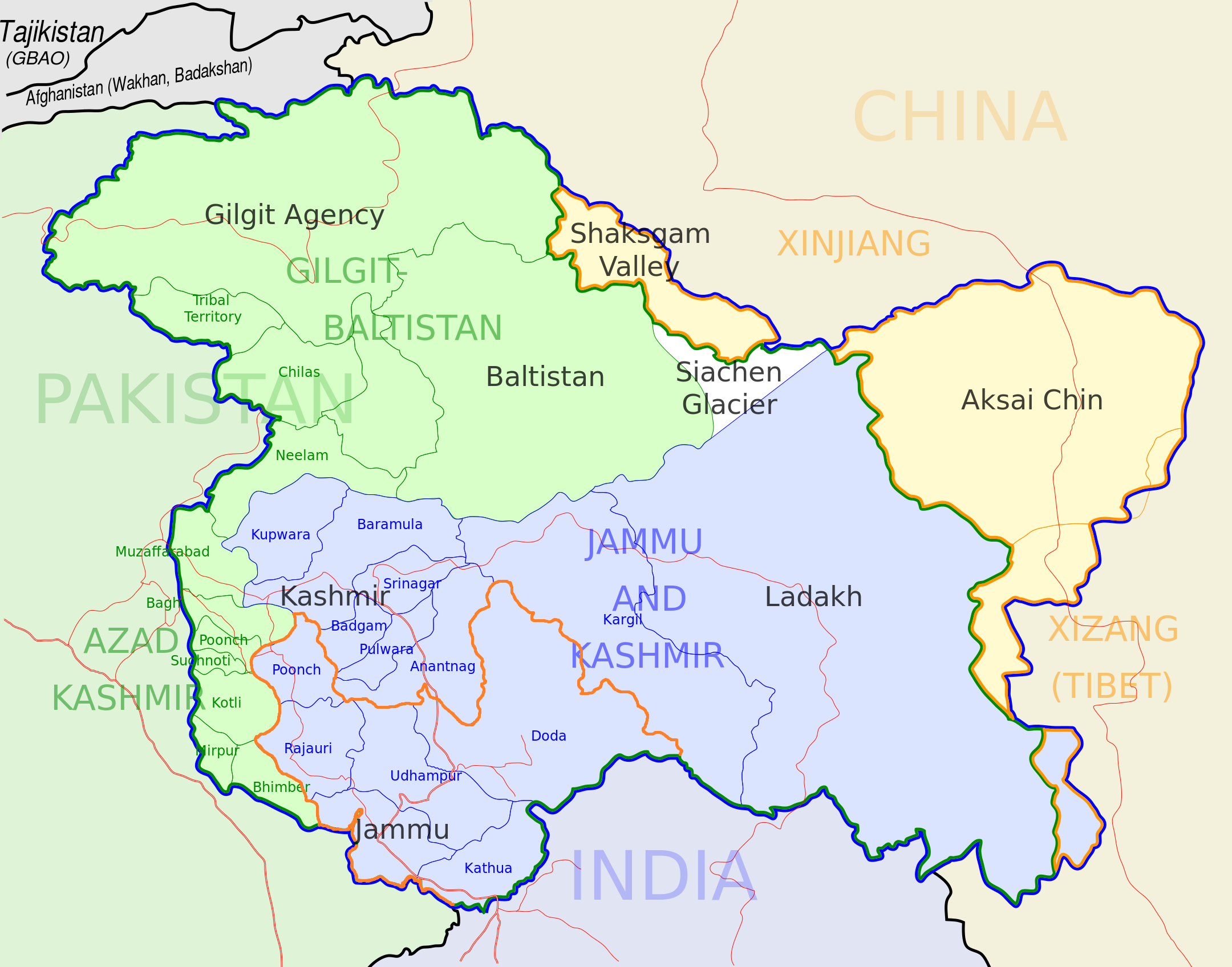
Map showing Siachen Glacier

On 31 October 1984, Indira Gandhi was assassinated by two of her bodyguards, and anti-Sikh riots erupted in Delhi and parts of Punjab, causing the deaths of thousands of Sikhs along with pillage, arson, and rape. Senior members of the Congress Party have been implicated in stirring the violence against Sikhs. Government investigation has failed to date to discover the causes and punish the perpetrators, but public opinion blamed Congress leaders for directing attacks on Sikhs in Delhi.

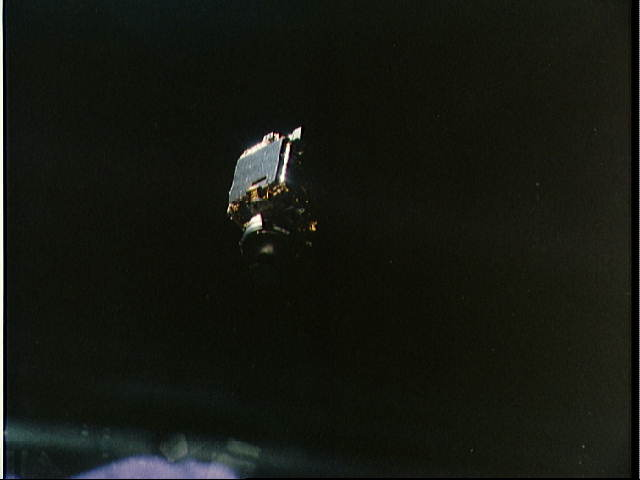
INSAT system is the largest domestic communication system in the Asia–Pacific Region. It is a series of multipurpose geo-stationary satellites launched by ISRO to satisfy the telecommunications, broadcasting, meteorology, and search and rescue operations in India.

=== Rajiv Gandhi administration ===
The Congress party chose Rajiv Gandhi, Indira's older son, as the next prime minister. Rajiv had been elected to Parliament only in 1982, and at 40, was the youngest national political leader and prime minister ever. But his youth and inexperience were an asset in the eyes of citizens tired of the inefficacy and corruption of career politicians, and looking for newer policies and a fresh start to resolve the country's long-standing problems. The Parliament was dissolved, and Rajiv led the Congress party to its largest majority in history (over 415 seats out of 545 possible), reaping a sympathy vote over his mother's assassination.

Rajiv Gandhi initiated a series of reforms: the Licence Raj was loosened, and government restrictions on foreign currency, travel, foreign investment, and imports decreased considerably. This allowed private businesses to use resources and produce commercial goods without government bureaucracy interfering, and the influx of foreign investment increased India's national reserves. As prime minister, Rajiv broke from his mother's precedent to improve relations with the United States, which increased economic aid and scientific co-operation. Rajiv's encouragement of science and technology resulted in a major expansion of the telecommunications industry and India's space programme, and gave birth to the software industry and information technology sector. Rajiv received criticism from some members of the Congress Party for his economic liberalisation policy, which led him to pledge in 1985 (as noted by one journal) ‘not to deviate from the ideals and principles of socialism “under any circumstances.”’

In December 1984, gas leaked out at the Union Carbide pesticides plant in the central Indian city of Bhopal. Thousands were killed immediately, while many more subsequently died or were left disabled.

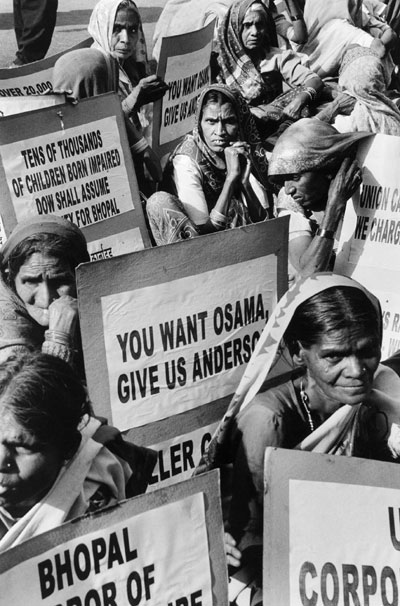
Victims of the 1984 Bhopal disaster march in September 2006, demanding the extradition of American businessman Warren Anderson. It is considered the worst industrial disaster in history.

On 1 March 1985, the Rajiv Gandhi government passed the historic anti-defection law or the 52nd amendment of the Constitution of India in Parliament that limited the ability of MPs and MLAs to switch political parties in Parliament.

On 23 April 1985, the Supreme Court of India in a landmark judgement of Mohd. Ahmed Khan v. Shah Bano Begum gave maintenance to a divorced Muslim woman Shah Bano Begum who had divorced her husband Mohammed Ahmed Khan in 1978 from Indore. The All India Muslim Personal Law Board lodged protests to nullify this verdict. This triggered controversy about the extent of having different personal laws for different religions in India.

In 1986, the Rajiv Gandhi government with its super majority passed the Muslim Women (Protection of Rights on Divorce) Act, 1986 to protect the rights of Muslim women who have been divorced from their husbands and nullify the Shah bano case judgement.

India in 1987 brokered an agreement with the Government of Sri Lanka and agreed to deploy troops for peacekeeping operation in Sri Lanka's ethnic conflict led by the LTTE. Rajiv sent Indian troops to enforce the agreement and disarm the Tamil rebels, but the Indian Peace Keeping Force, as it was known, became entangled in outbreaks of violence, ultimately ending up fighting the Tamil rebels itself, and becoming a target of attack from Sri Lankan nationalists. V. P. Singh withdrew the IPKF in 1990, but thousands of Indian soldiers had died. Rajiv's departure from socialist policies did not sit well with the masses, who did not benefit from the innovations. Unemployment was a serious problem, and India's burgeoning population added ever-increasing needs for diminishing resources.

Rajiv Gandhi's image as an honest politician (he was nicknamed "Mr. Clean" by the press) was shattered when the Bofors scandal broke, revealing that senior government officials had taken bribes over defence contracts by a Swedish guns producer.

=== Janata Dal ===
General elections in 1989 gave Rajiv's Congress a plurality, much less than the majority which propelled him to power.

Power came instead to his former finance and defence minister, VP Singh of Janata Dal. Singh had been moved from the Finance ministry to the Defence ministry after he unearthed some scandals which made the Congress leadership uncomfortable. Singh then unearthed the Bofors scandal, and was sacked from the party and office. Becoming a popular crusader for reform and clean government, Singh led the Janata Dal coalition to a majority. He was supported by BJP and the leftist parties from outside. Becoming Prime Minister, Singh made an important visit to the Golden Temple shrine, to heal the wounds of the past. He implemented the Mandal Commission report, to increase the quota in reservation for low-caste Hindus. His government fell after Singh, along with Bihar's Chief Minister Lalu Prasad Yadav's government, had Advani arrested in Samastipur and stopped his Ram Rath Yatra, which was going to the Babri Masjid site in Ayodhya on 23 October 1990. The Bharatiya Janata Party withdrew their support to Singh government, causing them to lose parliamentary vote of confidence on 7 November 1990. Chandra Shekhar split to form the Janata Dal (Socialist), supported by Rajiv's Congress. This new government also collapsed in a matter of months, when Congress withdrew its support.

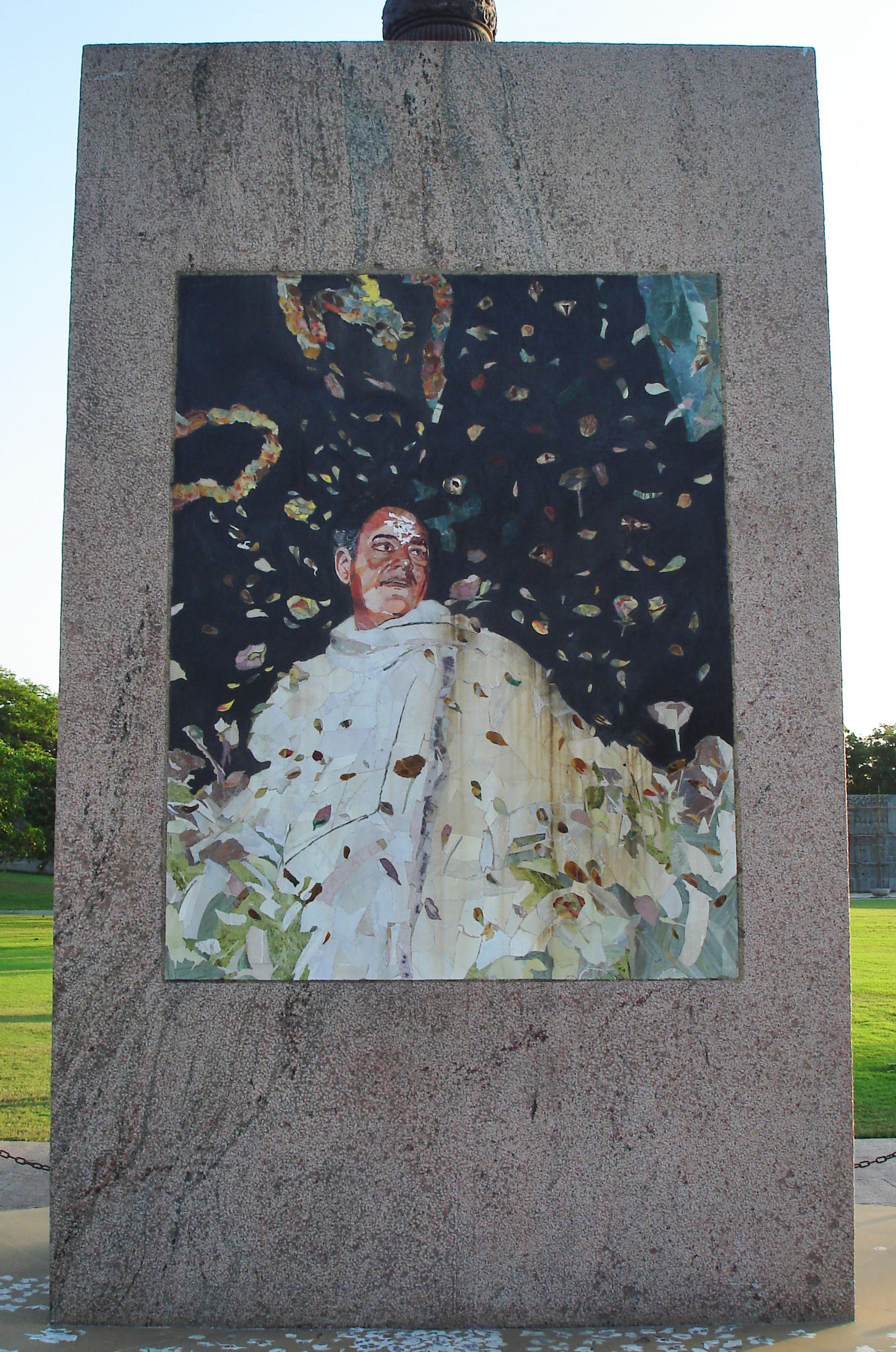
The stone mosaic that stands at the exact location where Rajiv Gandhi was assassinated in Sriperumbudur.

== 1990s ==
The then- Chief Minister of Jammu and Kashmir, Farooq Abdullah (son of former Chief Minister Sheikh Abdullah) announced an alliance with the ruling Congress party for the elections of 1987. But, the elections were allegedly rigged in favour of him. This led to the rise of the armed extremist insurgency in Jammu and Kashmir composed, in part, of those who unfairly lost elections. India has constantly maintained the position of blaming Pakistan for supplying these groups with logistical support, arms, recruits and training.

Militants in Kashmir reportedly tortured and killed local Kashmiri Pandits, forcing them to leave Kashmir in large numbers. Around 90% of the Kashmiri Pandits left Kashmir during the 1990s, resulting in the ethnic cleansing of Kashmiri Hindus.

On 21 May 1991, while former prime minister Rajiv Gandhi campaigned in Tamil Nadu on behalf of Congress (Indira), a Liberation Tigers of Tamil Eelam (LTTE) female suicide bomber assassinated him and many others by setting off the bomb in her belt by leaning forward while garlanding him. In the elections, Congress (Indira) won 244 parliamentary seats and put together a coalition, returning to power under the leadership of P.V. Narasimha Rao. This Congress-led government, which served a full five-year term, initiated a gradual process of economic liberalisation and reform, which has opened the Indian economy to global trade and investment. India's domestic politics also took new shape, as traditional alignments by caste, creed, and ethnicity gave way to a plethora of small, regionally-based political parties.

But India was rocked by communal violence (see Bombay riots) between Hindus and Muslims that killed over 10,000 people, following the Babri Mosque demolition by Hindu extremists in the course of the Ram Janmabhoomi dispute in Ayodhya in December 1992.

=== 1993 Mumbai Blasts ===
On 12 March 1993, a series of serial blasts occurred in Mumbai which killed 257 people and injured more than 1400 people. The attack was claimed by Dawood Ibrahim, the leader of the Mumbai-based organised crime syndicate, the D-Company.

On 22 February 1994, the Parliament passed a unanimous resolution declaring Kashmir as an integral part of India and demanded that Pakistan to vacate all its areas of Kashmir under its illegal occupation.

The final months of the Rao-led government in the spring of 1996 suffered the effects of several major political corruption scandals, which contributed to the worst electoral performance by the Congress Party in its history till then as the Hindu nationalist Bharatiya Janata Party emerged as the largest single party.

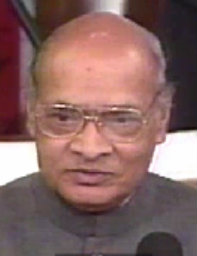
P. V. Narasimha Rao

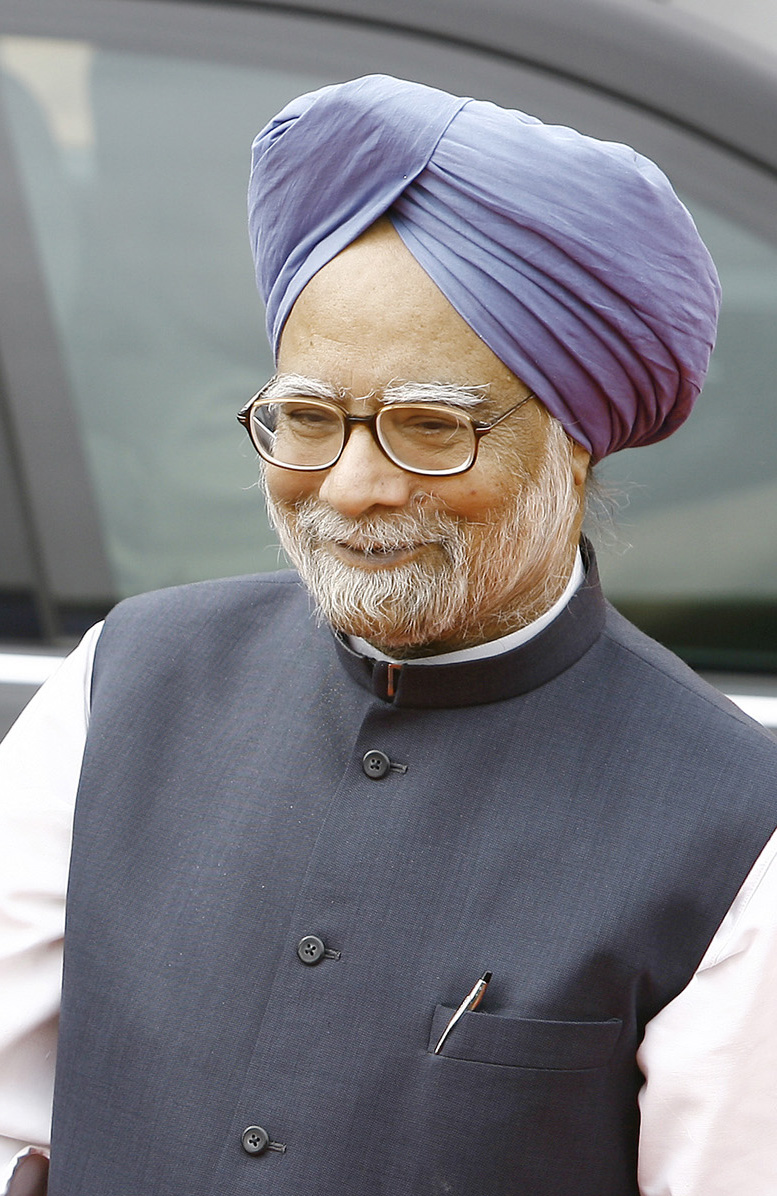
Manmohan Singh

Economic liberalisation in India was initiated in 1991 by Prime Minister P. V. Narasimha Rao and his then-Finance Minister Dr. Manmohan Singh. Rao was often referred to as Chanakya for his ability to steer tough economic and political legislation through the parliament at a time when he headed a minority government.

=== Economic reforms ===
Under the policies initiated by the then Prime Minister P. V. Narasimha Rao and his then-Finance Minister Dr. Manmohan Singh, India's economy expanded rapidly. The economic reforms were a reaction to an impending balance of payment crisis. The Rao administration initiated the privatisation of large, inefficient, and loss-inducing government corporations. The UF government had attempted a progressive budget that encouraged reforms, but the 1997 Asian financial crisis and political instability created economic stagnation. The Vajpayee administration continued with privatisation, reduction of taxes, a sound fiscal policy aimed at reducing deficits and debts, and increased initiatives for public works. Cities like Bangalore, Hyderabad, Pune, and Ahmedabad have risen in prominence and economic importance, becoming centres of rising industries and destinations for foreign investment and firms. Strategies like forming Special Economic Zones—tax amenities, good communications infrastructure, low regulation—to encourage industries has paid off in many parts of the country.

A rising generation of well-educated and skilled professionals in scientific sectors of the industry began propelling the Indian economy, as the information technology industry took hold across India with the proliferation of computers. The new technologies increased the efficiency of activity in almost every type of industry, which also benefitted from the availability of skilled labor. Foreign investment and outsourcing of jobs to India's labor markets further enhanced India's economic growth. A large middle class has arisen across India, which has increased the demand, and thus the production of a wide array of consumer goods. Unemployment is steadily declining, and poverty has fallen to approximately 22%. Gross Domestic Product growth increased to beyond 7%. While serious challenges remain, India is enjoying a period of economic expansion that has propelled it to the forefront of the world economy, and has correspondingly increased its influence in political and diplomatic terms.

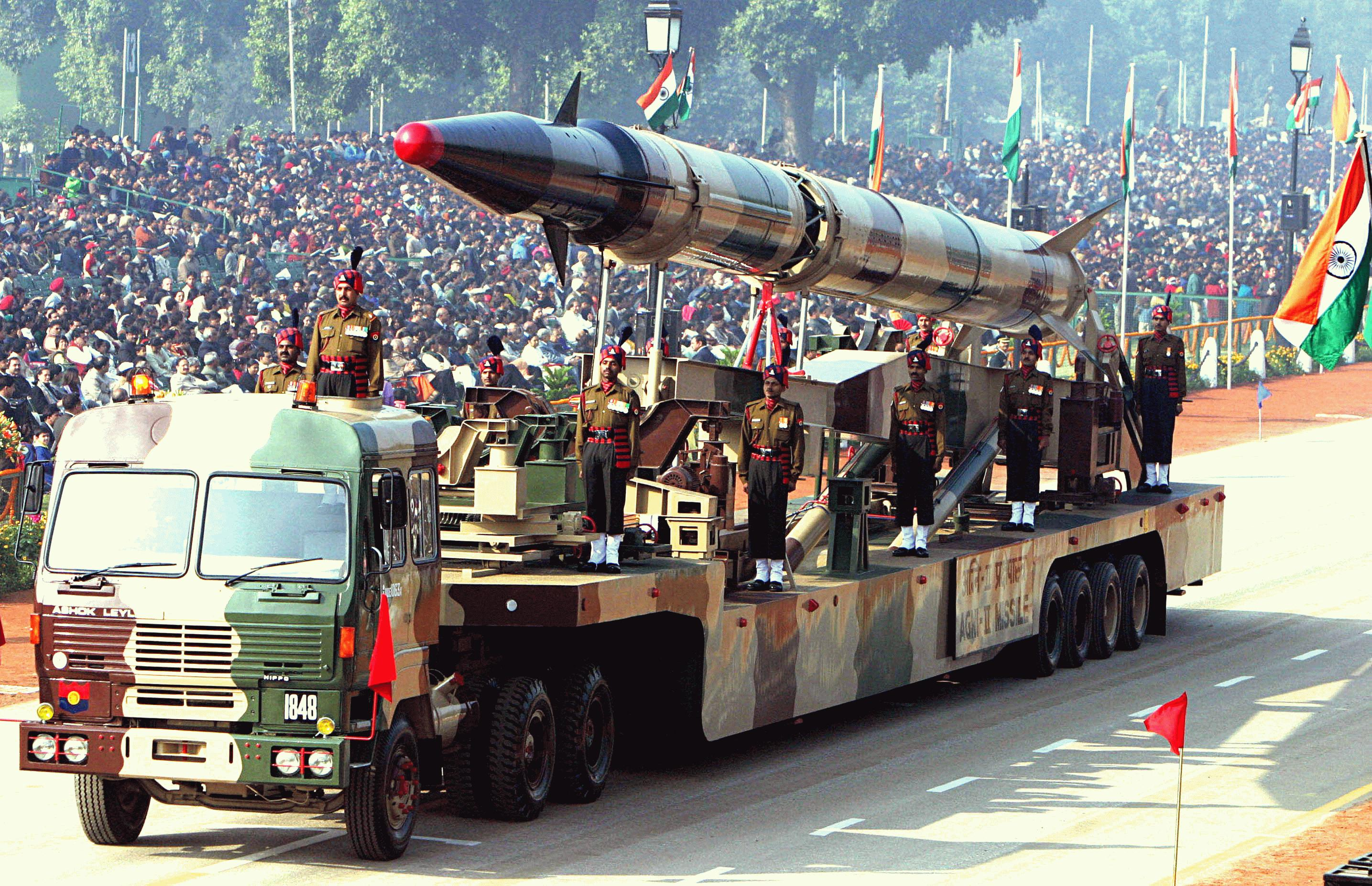
Nuclear capable Agni-II ballistic missile. Since May 1998, India declared itself to be a full-fledged nuclear state.

=== Era of coalitions ===
The Bharatiya Janata Party (BJP) emerged from the May 1996 national elections as the single-largest party in the Lok Sabha but without enough strength to prove a majority on the floor of that Parliament. Under Prime Minister Atal Bihari Vajpayee, the BJP coalition lasted in power 13 days. With all political parties wishing to avoid another round of elections, a 14-party coalition led by the Janata Dal emerged to form a government known as the United Front. A United Front government under then Chief Minister of Karnataka H. D. Deve Gowda lasted less than a year. The leader of the Congress Party withdrew support in March 1997. Inder Kumar Gujral replaced Deve Gowda as the consensus choice for Prime Minister of a 16-party United Front coalition.

In November 1997, the Congress Party again withdrew support for the United Front. New elections in February 1998 brought the BJP the largest number of seats in Parliament (182), but this fell far short of a majority. On 20 March 1998, the President inaugurated a BJP-led coalition government, with Vajpayee again serving as prime minister. On 11 and 13 May 1998, this government conducted a series of five underground nuclear weapons tests, known collectively as Pokhran-II — which caused Pakistan to conduct its own tests that same year. India's nuclear tests prompted President of the United States Bill Clinton and Japan to impose economic sanctions on India pursuant to the 1994 Nuclear Proliferation Prevention Act and led to widespread international condemnation.

In the early months of 1999, Prime Minister Vajpayee made a historic bus trip to Pakistan and met with Pakistan's prime minister Nawaz Sharif, signing the bilateral Lahore peace declaration.

In April 1999, the coalition government led by the Bharatiya Janata Party (BJP) fell apart, leading to fresh elections in September after AIADMK supremo/ chief Jayalalithaa withdraw her support. In May and June 1999, India discovered an elaborate campaign of terrorist infiltration that resulted in the Kargil War in Kashmir, derailing a promising peace process that had begun only three months earlier when Prime Minister Vajpayee visited Pakistan, inaugurating the Delhi-Lahore bus service. Indian forces killed Pakistan-backed infiltrators and reclaimed important border posts in high-altitude warfare.

Soaring on popularity earned following the successful conclusion of the Kargil conflict, the National Democratic Alliance—a new coalition led by the BJP—gained a majority to form a government with Vajpayee as prime minister in October 1999. The end of the millennium was devastating to India, as a cyclone hit Orissa, killing at least 10,000.

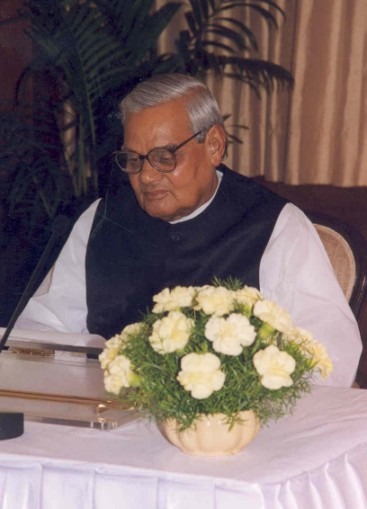
Atal Bihari Vajpayee became the first non-Congress Prime Minister to complete a full term. His tenure saw rapid growth of infrastructure, improved diplomatic relationship with the United States, economic reforms, nuclear tests, several foreign policy and military victories.

== 2000s ==
=== Under Bharatiya Janata Party ===
In May 2000, India's population exceeded 1 billion. President of the United States Bill Clinton made a groundbreaking visit to India to improve ties between the two nations. In January, massive earthquakes hit Gujarat state, killing at least 30,000.

Prime Minister Vajpayee met with Pakistan's President Pervez Musharraf in the first summit between Pakistan and India in more than two years in the middle of 2001. But the meeting failed without a breakthrough or even a joint statement because of differences over Kashmir region.

Three new states — Chhattisgarh, Jharkhand and Uttarakhand (originally Uttaranchal) — were formed in November 2000.

The National Democratic Alliance government's credibility was adversely affected by a number of political scandals (such as allegations that the Defence Minister George Fernandes took bribes) as well as reports of intelligence failures that led to the Kargil incursions going undetected, and the apparent failure of his talks with the Pakistani President. Following the September 11 attacks, the United States lifted sanctions which it had imposed against India and Pakistan in 1998. The move was seen as a reward for their support for the war on terror. The tensions of an imminent war between India and Pakistan again rose by the heavy Indian firing on Pakistani military posts along the Line of Control and the subsequent deadly 2001 Indian Parliament attack on 13 December 2001 and the 2001–02 India–Pakistan standoff.

On 27 February 2002, 59 Hindu pilgrims returning from Ayodhya were killed in a train fire in Godhra, Gujarat. This sparked off the 2002 Gujarat riots, leading to the deaths of 790 Muslims and 254 Hindus and with 223 people reported missing.

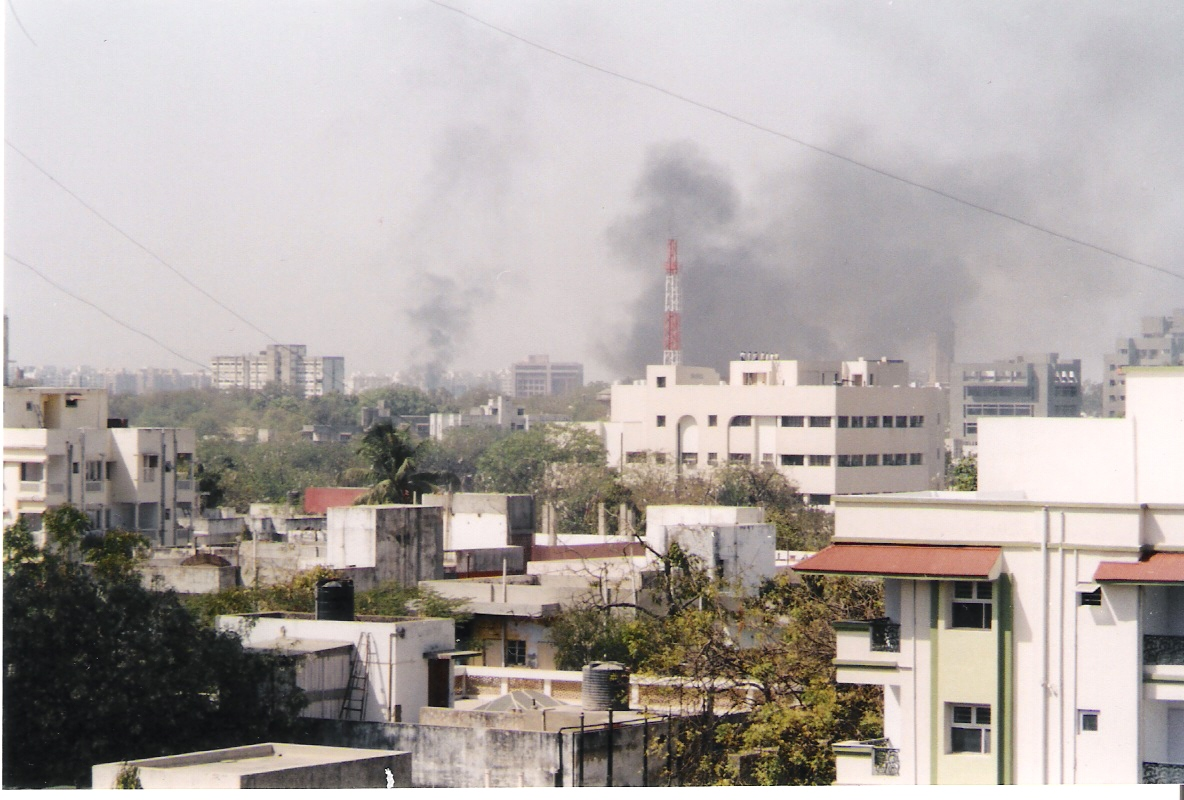
Image of skyline of Ahmedabad filled wih smoke as many buildings and shops are set on fire by the mob during the 2002 Gujarat violence.

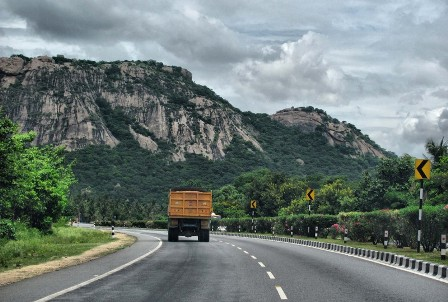
Section of Golden Quadrilateral highway. The project was launched in 2001 by NDA government led by Prime Minister Atal Bihari Vajpayee.

Throughout 2003, India's speedy economic progress, political stability, and a rejuvenated peace initiative with Pakistan increased the government's popularity. India and Pakistan agreed to resume direct air links and to allow overflights, and a groundbreaking meeting was held between the Indian government and moderate Kashmir separatists. The Golden Quadrilateral project aimed to link India's corners with a network of modern highways.

=== Congress rule returns ===
In January 2004 Prime Minister Vajpayee recommended early dissolution of the Lok Sabha and general elections. an alliance led by the Congress Party called United Progressive Alliance(UPA) won a surprise victory in elections held in May 2004. Manmohan Singh became the Prime Minister, after the Congress President Sonia Gandhi, the widow of former prime minister Rajiv Gandhi, declined to take the office, to defuse the controversy about whether her foreign birth should be considered a disqualification for the Prime Minister's post. Apart from the Congress party, other members of UPA included Socialist and regional parties. The alliance had outside support of India's Communist parties. Manmohan Singh became the first Sikh and non-Hindu to hold India's most powerful office. Singh continued economic liberalisation, although the need for support from Indian Socialists and Communists forestalled further privatisation for some time.

By the end of 2004, India began to withdraw some of its troops from Kashmir. By the middle of the next year, the Srinagar–Muzaffarabad Bus service was inaugurated, the first in 60 years to operate between Indian-administered and Pakistani-administered Kashmirs. However, in May 2006, suspected Islamic extremist militants killed 35 Hindus in the worst attacks in Indian-administered Kashmir for several months.

The 2004 Indian Ocean earthquake and tsunami devastated Indian coastlines and islands, killing an estimated 18,000 and displacing around 650,000. The tsunami was caused by a powerful undersea earthquake off the Indonesian coast. Natural disasters such as the Mumbai floods (killing more than 1,000) and Kashmir earthquake (killing 79,000) hit the subcontinent in the next year. In February 2006, the United Progressive Alliance government launched India's largest-ever rural jobs scheme, aimed at lifting around 60 million families out of poverty.

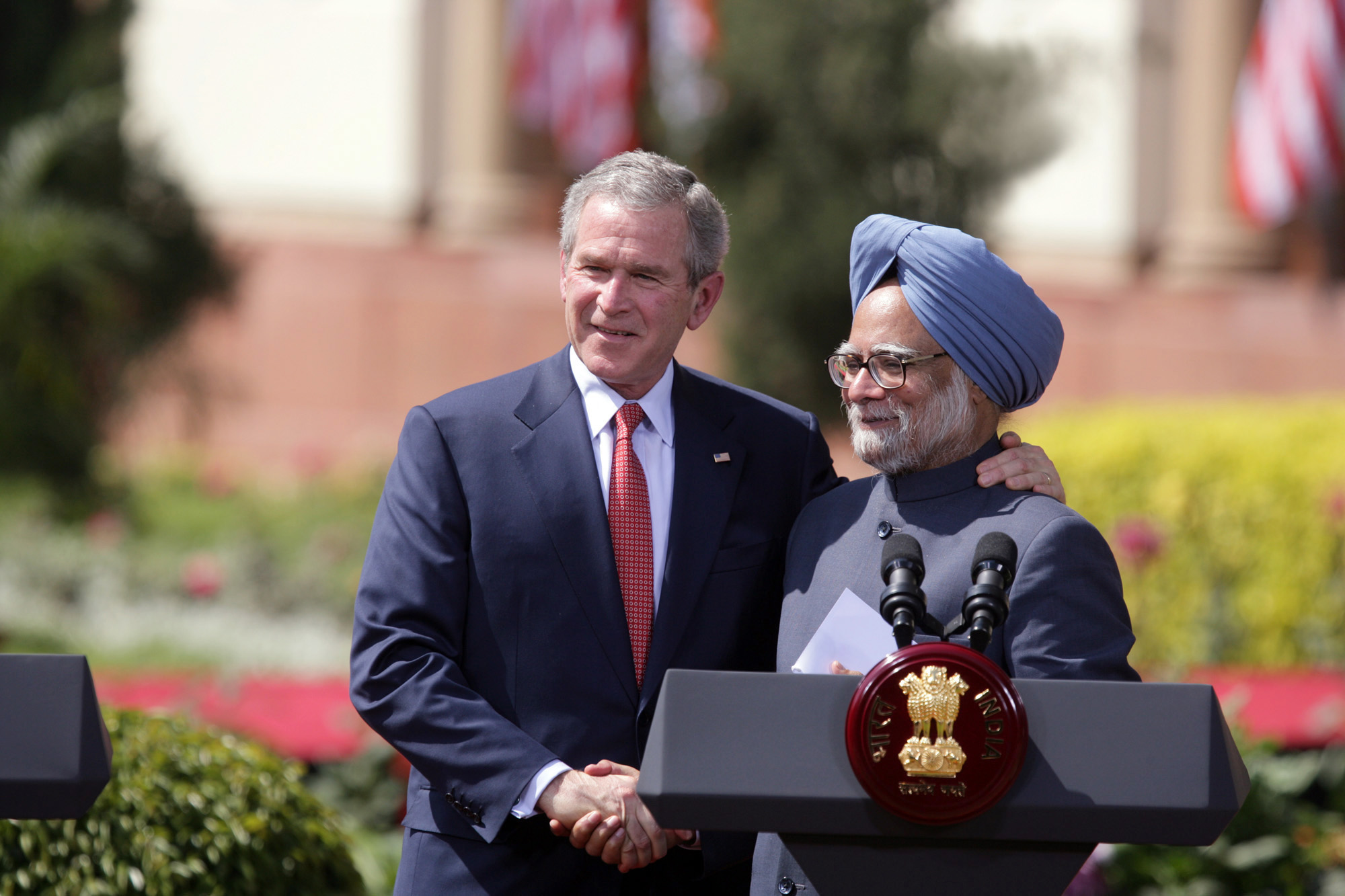
U.S. President George W. Bush and India's Prime Minister Manmohan Singh exchange handshakes in New Delhi on 2 March 2006 vis-à-vis the India–United States Civil Nuclear Agreement.

The United States and India signed a major nuclear co-operation agreement during a visit by United States President George W. Bush in March 2006. According to the nuclear deal, the United States was to give India access to civilian nuclear technology while India agreed to greater scrutiny for its nuclear programme. Later, United States approved a controversial law allowing India to buy their nuclear reactors and fuel for the first time in 30 years. In July 2008, the United Progressive Alliance survived a vote of confidence brought after left-wing parties withdrew their support over the nuclear deal. After the vote, several left-wing and regional parties formed a new alliance to oppose the government, saying it had been tainted by corruption. Within three months, following approval by the U.S. Congress, George W. Bush signed into law a nuclear deal with India, which ended a three-decade ban on American nuclear trade with Delhi.

In 2007, India got its first female President as Pratibha Patil was sworn in. Long associated with the Nehru–Gandhi family, Pratibha Patil was a low-profile governor of the state of Rajasthan before emerging as the favoured presidential candidate of Sonia Gandhi. In February, the infamous Samjhauta Express bombings took place, killing Pakistani civilians in Panipat, Haryana. As of 2011, nobody had been charged for the crime, though it has been linked to Abhinav Bharat, a shadowy Hindu fundamentalist group headed by a former Indian army officer.

In 2008 October, India successfully launched its first mission to the Moon, the uncrewed lunar probe called Chandrayaan-1. In the previous year, India had launched its first commercial space rocket, carrying an Italian satellite.

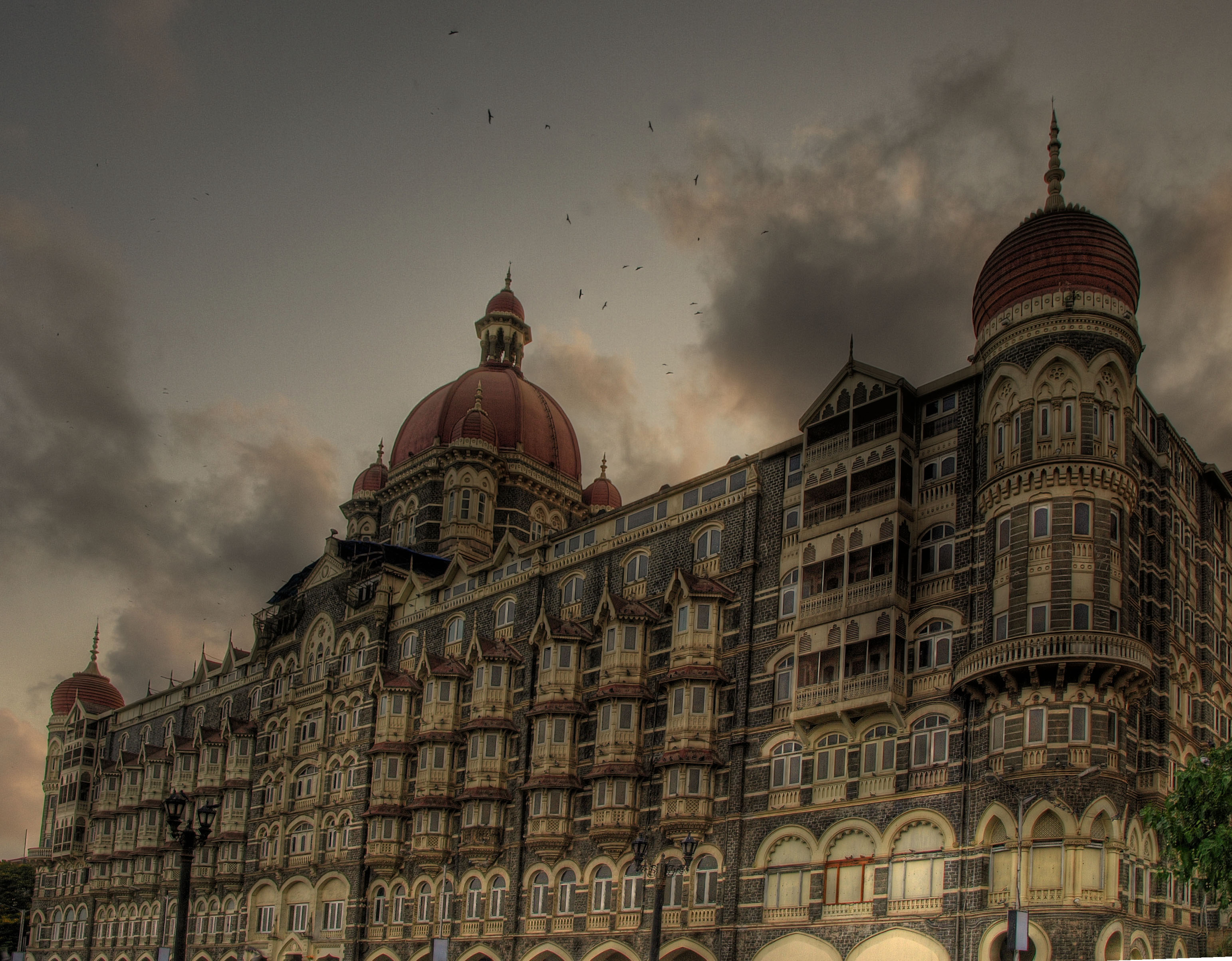
A view of the Taj Mahal Palace Hotel with smoke during the 2008 Mumbai attacks

=== 2008 Mumbai attacks ===
From 26 November 2008 to 29 November 2008, 10 Pakistani Lashkar-e-Taiba terrorists carried out a series of terrorist attacks in Mumbai which killed 175 people including nine of the attackers and wounded more than 300 people. One of the attackers named Ajmal Kasab was captured alive and was executed on 21 November 2012 after the Supreme Court of India in a landmark judgement upheld his death penalty. India blamed Lashkar-e-Taiba from Pakistan for carrying out the attacks and announced a "pause" in the ongoing peace process.

The Parliament of India passed a bill which led to the formation of the National Investigation Agency, a central agency to prosecute terrorism related offenses in response to the 2008 Mumbai attacks on 30 December 2008. It was assented by President, Pratibha Patil on 31 December 2008.

In July 2009, the Delhi High Court decriminalised consensual homosexual sex, re-interpreting the British Raj-era law, Section 377 of the Indian Penal Code, as unconstitutional in regard to criminalising consensual sex between two homosexual adults or decriminalising such acts between adult heterosexuals or other consenting adults, that may be deemed unnatural.

In the Indian general election in 2009, the United Progressive Alliance won a convincing and resounding 262 seats, with Congress alone winning 206 seats. However, the Congress-led government faced many allegations of corruption. Inflation rose to an all-time high, and the ever-increasing prices of food commodities caused widespread agitation.

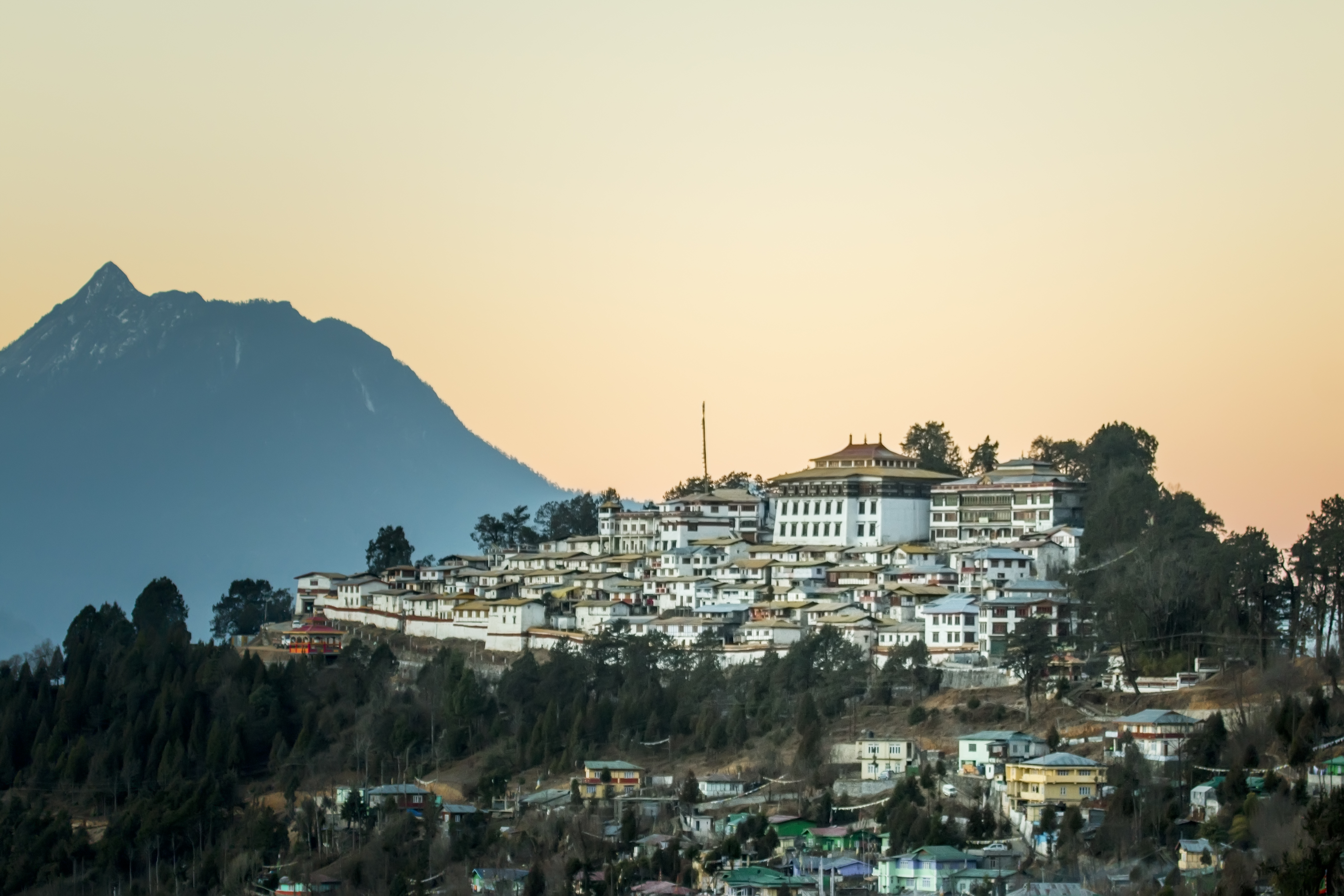
Tawang Monastery in Arunachal Pradesh, is the largest monastery in India and second largest in the world after the Potala Palace in Lhasa, Tibet. It is one of the few monasteries of Tibetan Buddhism that have remained protected from Mao's Cultural Revolution without any damage.

On 8 November 2009, in spite of strong protests by China, which claims the whole of Arunachal Pradesh as its own, the 14th Dalai Lama visited Tawang Monastery in Arunachal Pradesh, which was a monumental event to the people of the region, and the abbot of the monastery greeted him with much fanfare and adulation.

21st-century India is facing the Naxalite–Maoist rebels, in the words of Prime Minister Manmohan Singh, India's "greatest internal security challenge", and other terrorist tensions (such as Islamist terrorist campaigns in and out of Jammu & Kashmir and terrorism in India's Northeast). Terrorism has increased in India, with bomb blasts in leading cities like Mumbai, New Delhi, Jaipur, Bangalore, and Hyderabad. In the new millennium, India improved relations with many countries and foreign unions including the United States, the European Union, Israel, and the People's Republic of China. The economy of India has grown at a very rapid pace. India was now being looked at as a potential superpower.

== 2010s ==
=== Congress rule continues ===
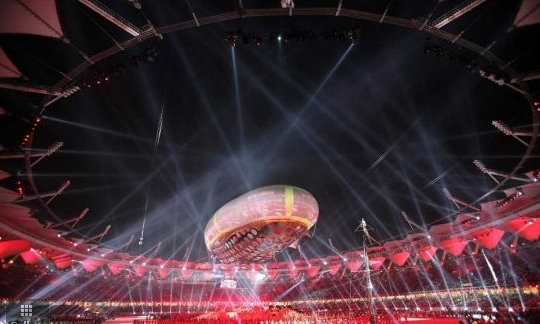
The 2010 Commonwealth Games opening ceremony in Jawaharlal Nehru Stadium is one of the largest international multi-sport events to be staged in Delhi and India.

The concerns and controversies over the 2010 Commonwealth Games rocked the country in 2010, raising questions about the credibility of the government followed by the 2G spectrum case and Adarsh Housing Society scam. In mid-2011, Anna Hazare, a prominent social activist, staged a 12-day hunger strike in Delhi in protest at state corruption, after government proposals to tighten up anti-graft legislation fell short of his demands.

In June 2010, violent unrest broke out in Kashmir over the fake encounter killing of three Kashmiri people by security forces suspected to be Pakistani terrorists along the Line of Control.

Despite all this, India showed great promise with a higher growth rate in gross domestic product. In January 2011, India assumed a nonpermanent seat in the United Nations Security Council for the 2011–12 term. In 2004, India had launched an application for a permanent seat on the UN Security Council, along with Brazil, Germany and Japan. In March, India overtook China to become the world's largest importer of arms.

The Telangana movement reached its peak in 2011–12, leading to formation of India's 29th state, Telangana, in June 2014.

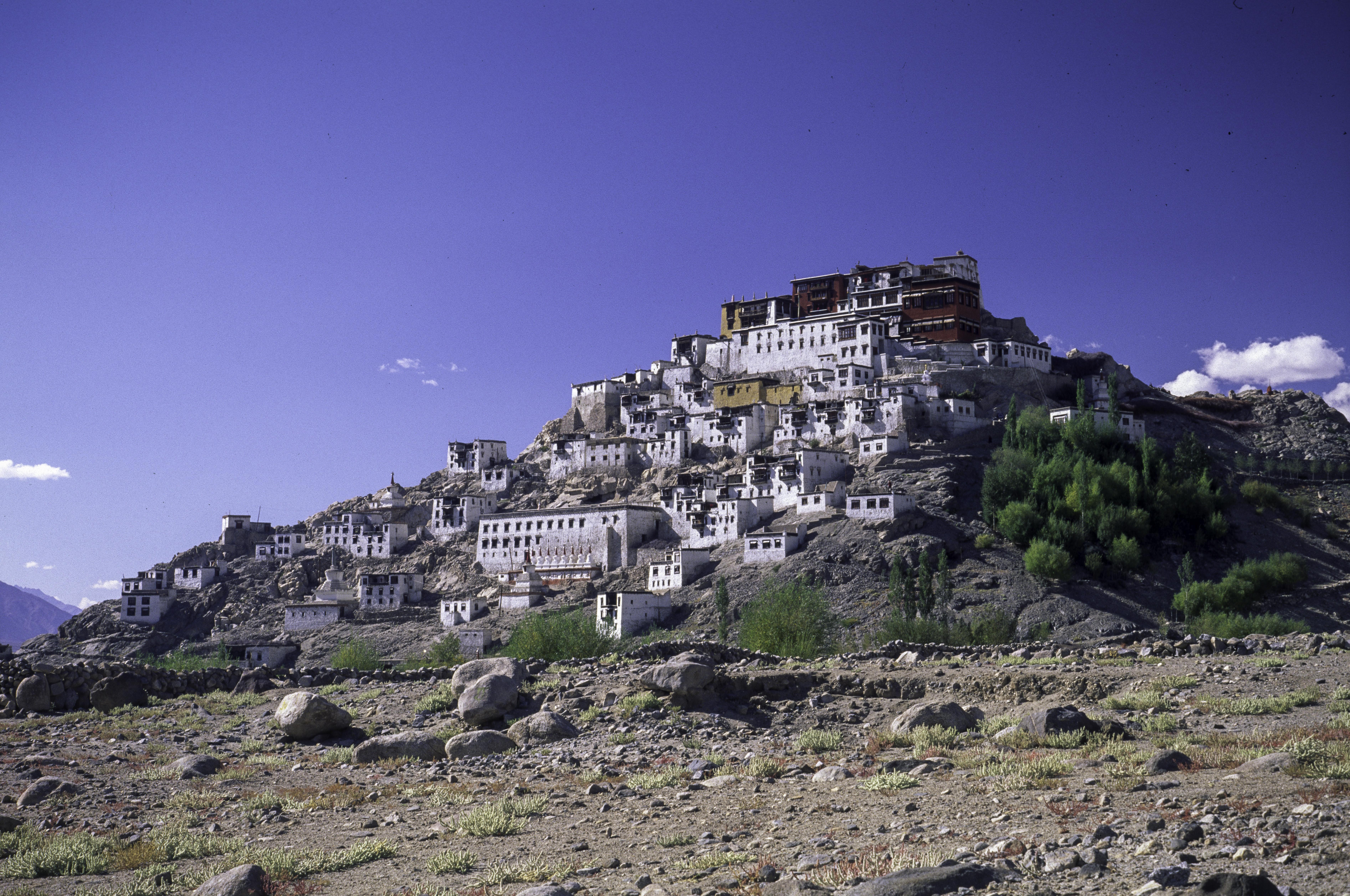
2010 Ladakh floods damaged 71 towns and villages, including the main town in the area, Leh, and nearby town of Thiksey, where Thikse Monastery is located.

In August 2010, cloudbursts and the ensuing flooding in the Ladakh region of North India resulted in the deaths of around 255 people, while affecting 9,000 people directly. In June 2013, a multi-day cloudburst in Uttarakhand and other north Indian states caused devastating floods and landslides, with more than 5,700 people "presumed dead." In September 2014, floods in the state of Jammu and Kashmir, following heavy rains due to monsoon season, killed around 277 people and brought extensive damage to property. A further 280 people died in the neighbouring Pakistani regions, particularly in Pakistani Punjab.

A series of border skirmishes broke out between India and Pakistan along the Line of Control in the years 2011, 2013, 2014, 2015 where India accused Pakistan of ceasefire violations.

=== 2012 Delhi gang rape & murder case ===
The 2012 Delhi gang rape & murder case on 16 December 2012 led to subsequent protests which resulted in changes in the laws related to rape and offences against women.

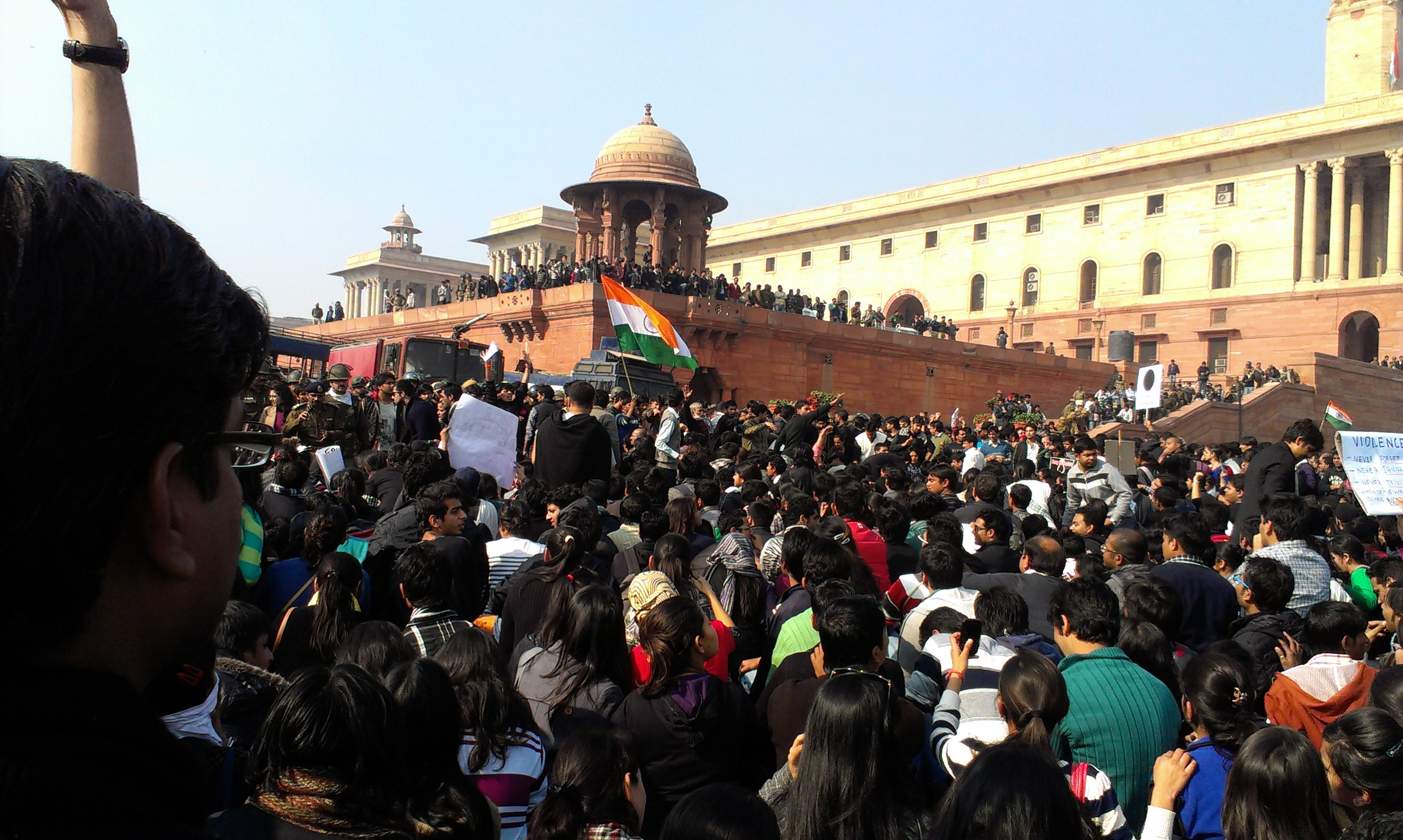
Protests by the students outside Raisina Hill after the 2012 Delhi gang rape and murder.

In April 2013, the Saradha Group scandal was unearthed, caused by the collapse of a Ponzi scheme run by Saradha Group, a consortium of over 200 private companies in Eastern India, causing an estimated loss of INR 200–300 billion (US$4–6 billion) to over 1.7 million depositors. In December 2013, the Supreme Court of India overturned the Delhi High Court ruling on Sec 377, criminalising homosexual sex between consenting adults once again in the country.

In August – September 2013, clashes between Hindus and Muslims in Muzaffarnagar, Uttar Pradesh, resulted in at least 62 deaths, injured 93, and left more than 50,000 displaced.

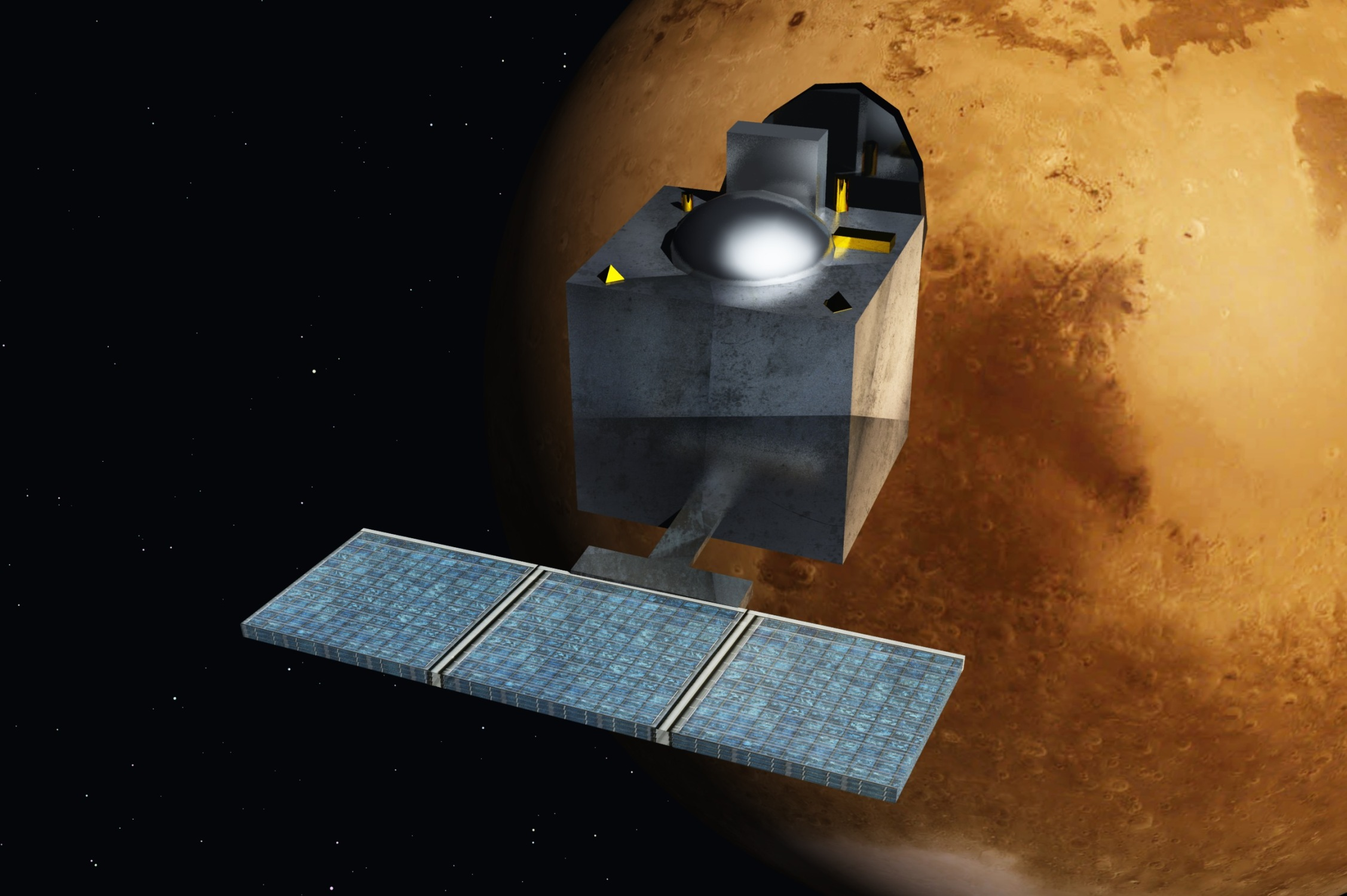
Artist's rendering of the Mars Orbiter Mission spacecraft

In November 2013, India launched its first interplanetary mission, the Mars Orbiter Mission, popularly known as Mangalyaan, to Mars and, was successful, so ISRO on 24 September 2014, became the fourth space agency to reach Mars, after the Soviet space program, NASA, and the European Space Agency. ISRO also became the first space agency and India the first country to reach Mars on its maiden attempt.

=== 2014 – Return of Bharatiya Janata Party (BJP) Government ===
The Hindutva movement advocating Hindu nationalism originated in the 1920s and has remained a strong political force in India. The major party of the religious right since the 1950s had been the Bharatiya Jana Sangh. The Jana Sangh joined the Janata party in 1977 but when that party fell apart in a short period of three years, the erstwhile members of Jana Sangh in 1980 formed the Bharatiya Janata Party (BJP). The BJP grew its support base in the following decades and is now the most dominant political party in India. On 13 September 2013 the Chief Minister of Gujarat, Narendra Modi, was named the BJP's candidate for prime minister ahead of the 2014 Lok Sabha election. Several BJP leaders initially expressed opposition to Modi's candidature, including BJP founding member L. K. Advani. Contrary to the strategies used by the party during previous elections, Modi played the dominant role in the BJP's presidential style election campaign. The 16th national general election, held in early 2014, saw a landslide victory for the BJP led NDA; the alliance gained a landslide victory and formed a government under the premiership of Modi. The Modi government's landslide victory in the 2014 Lok Sabha election and popularity helped the BJP win several state assembly elections in India. Narendra Modi took oath as the 14th Prime Minister of India on 26 May 2014.

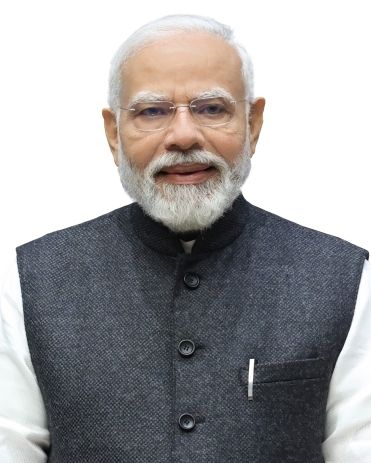
Potrait of Narendra Modi as the 14th Prime Minister of India

The Modi government implemented several initiatives and campaigns to increase manufacturing and infrastructure – notably — Make in India, Digital India and the Swachh Bharat Mission.

On 18 September 2016, a terrorist attack took place in an Indian Army base in Uri, Jammu and Kashmir which killed 19 soldiers and 4 militants behind the attack. It took place at a time when the Kashmir Valley was facing extremely high levels of violent unrest after the killing of Burhan Wani by security forces on 8 July 2016.

On 29 September 2016, in response to the Uri attack, teams of Indian Army Para (Special Forces) conducted surgical strikes along the Line of Control in Pakistan occupied Kashmir on terrorist hideouts. This led to the start of border skirmishes between India and Pakistan along the Line of Control.

=== 2016 Indian Banknote Demonetization ===
On 8 November 2016, the Indian government announced demonetisation of 500 and 1000 rupee banknotes of the Mahatma Gandhi series in order to curb black money, fake currency notes, terror funding and increase cashless transactions. This move was widely criticised by opposition parties as it failed to achieve its required objectives. This led to many people standing in queues in exchange of their banknotes which led to several deaths linked in rush to exchange cash.

In April 2017, during the 2017 Srinagar by-election a human shield incident took place involving a 26-year-old man Farooq Ahmed Dar being tied in front of an Indian Army jeep and Major Leetul Gogoi of the Indian Army sparked outrage and debate on human rights abuses in Jammu and Kashmir.

=== Goods and Services Tax (GST) ===
The largest tax reform in India's history, the Goods and Services Tax (GST), was introduced in 2017.

On 22 August 2017, the Supreme Court of India in a landmark verdict declared the triple talaq as unconstitutional and asked the Parliament of India to pass a law on this.

On 20 July 2018, the Narendra Modi led NDA government won the first no confidence motion moved by the Telugu Desam Party over the non-allocation of funds to the state of Andhra Pradesh. In August 2018, a series of flash floods took place in the state of Kerala which killed more than 483 people and displaced more than one million people. On 14 February 2019, a vehicle-borne suicide bomber assaulted a convoy of cars carrying Central Reserve Police Force (CRPF) troops on the Jammu-Srinagar National Highway in the Pulwama area of Jammu and Kashmir.

On 26 February 2019, India carried out the 2019 Balakot airstrike when its airplanes flew across the de facto border in Kashmir and dropped bombs in the town of Balakot in Pakistan's Khyber Pakhtunkhwa region. This led to violent border skirmishes between India and Pakistan along the Line of Control. After a dogfight between Indian and Pakistani fighter pilots. Abhinandan Varthaman, an Indian wing commander, was taken prisoner by the Pakistani side. Acting nonetheless under pressure from various world leaders and constrained by the Vienna Convention, Pakistan was compelled to free the Indian pilot.

General elections were held between 11 April 2019 to 19 May 2019 in seven phases to elect members of the 17th Lok Sabha. The BJP led NDA alliance won a landslide victory with 353 seats (BJP 303 seats) with Narendra Modi taking oath as the Prime Minister of India for the second time.

On 31 July 2019, the Parliament of India passed the Muslim Women (Protection of Rights on Marriage) Act, 2019 to criminalize the activity of triple talaq after the Supreme Court of India declared triple talaq as unconstitutional in 2017.

=== Revocation of Article 370 ===
By repealing Article 370 of the Indian Constitution on 5 August 2019, the state of Jammu and Kashmir was separated into two separate union territories known as Jammu and Kashmir and Ladakh. The bill came into effect as a law on 31 October 2019. After the cancellation of Article 370, millions of people in Jammu and Kashmir didn't have communication with the outside world as the state remained under a complete lockdown until February 2021.

On 9 November 2019, the Supreme Court of India delivered a landmark judgement by ruling in favour of the Hindus in the Ram Janmabhoomi Temple. The Parliament of India passed the Citizenship Amendment Act on 11 December 2019, sparking widespread protests.

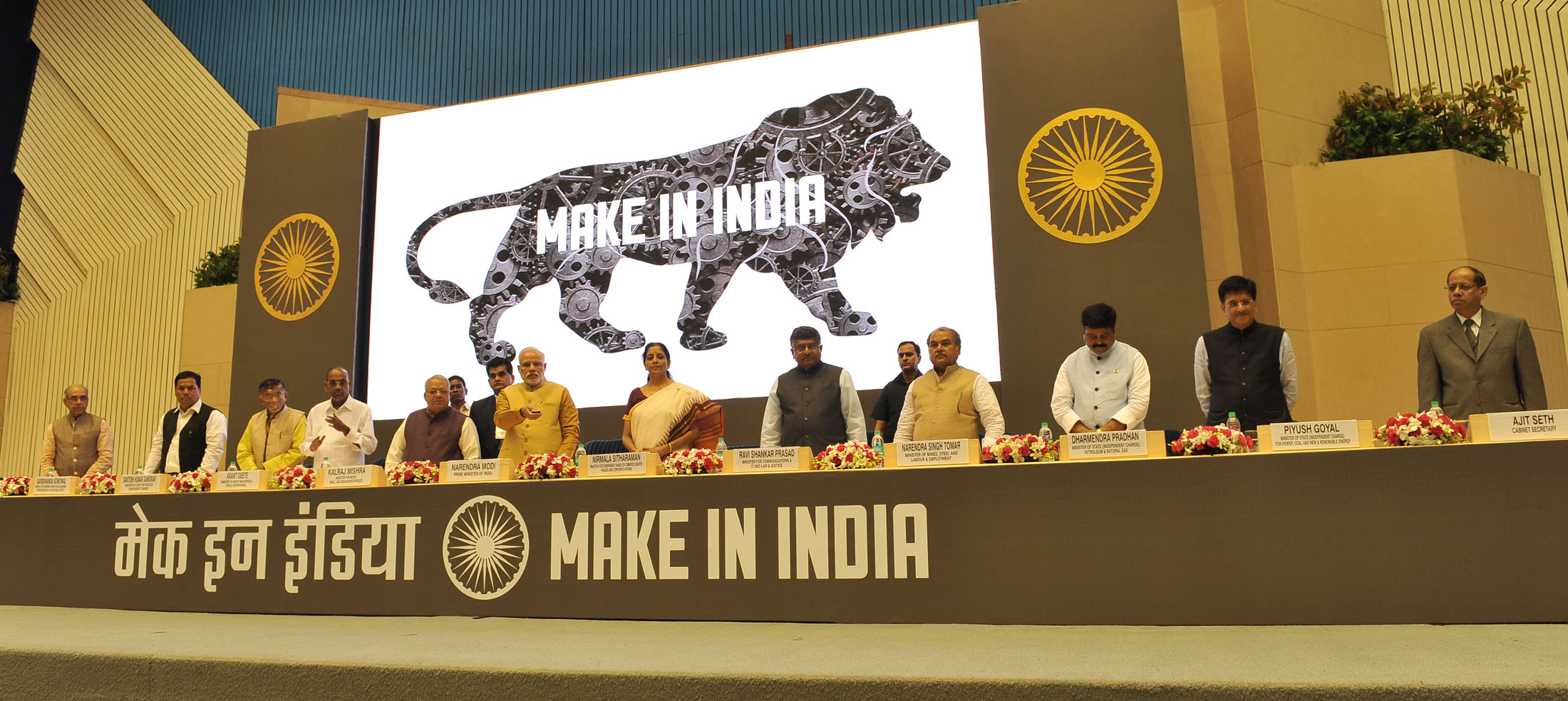
Prime Minister Modi at the launch of the Make in India programme which was meant to encourage companies to manufacture their products in India and also increase their investment.

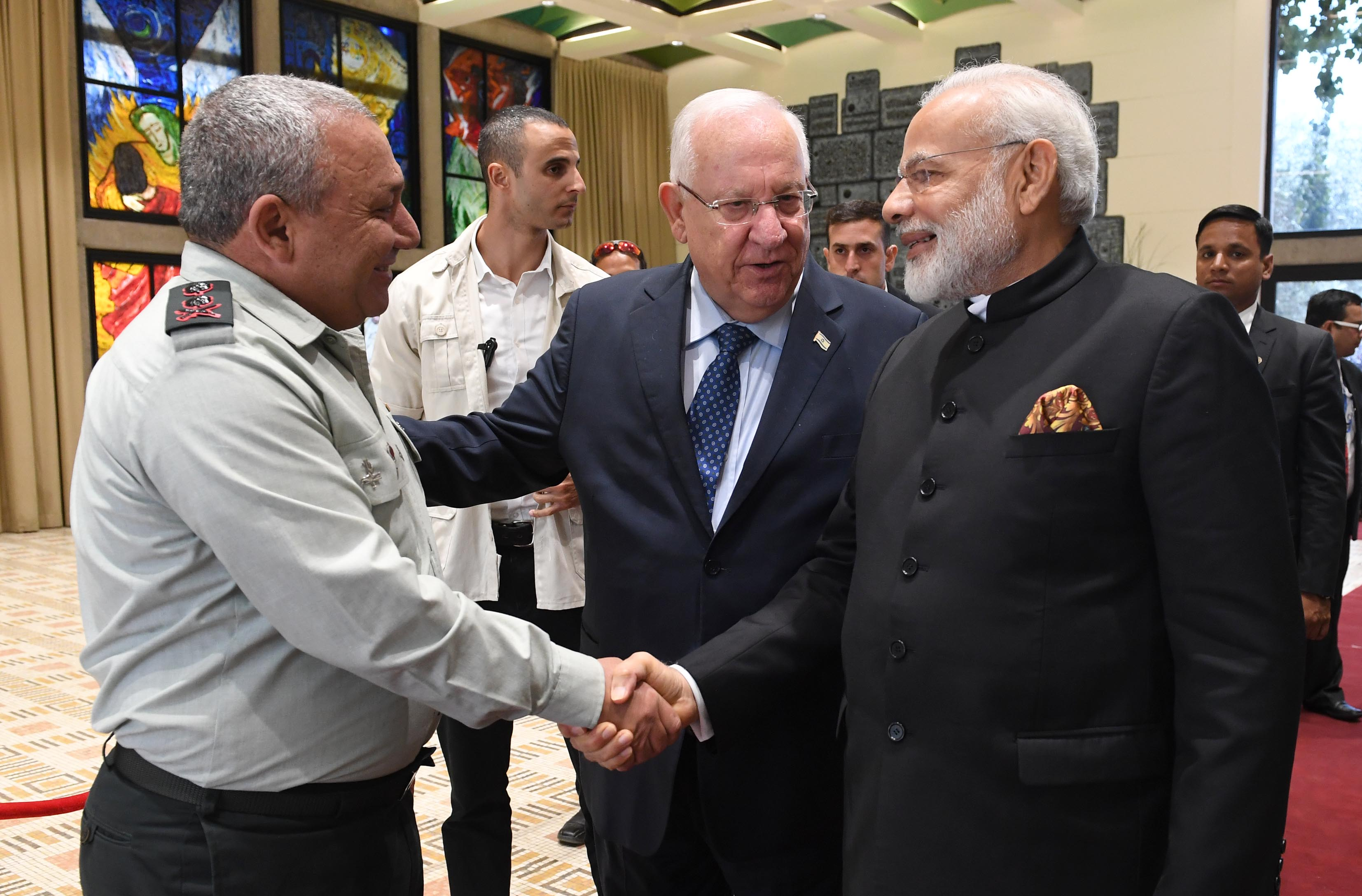
10th President of Israel Reuven Rivlin and Chief of General Staff of the Israel Defense Forces Gadi Eizenkot with PM Modi, the first Indian Prime Minister to visit Israel.

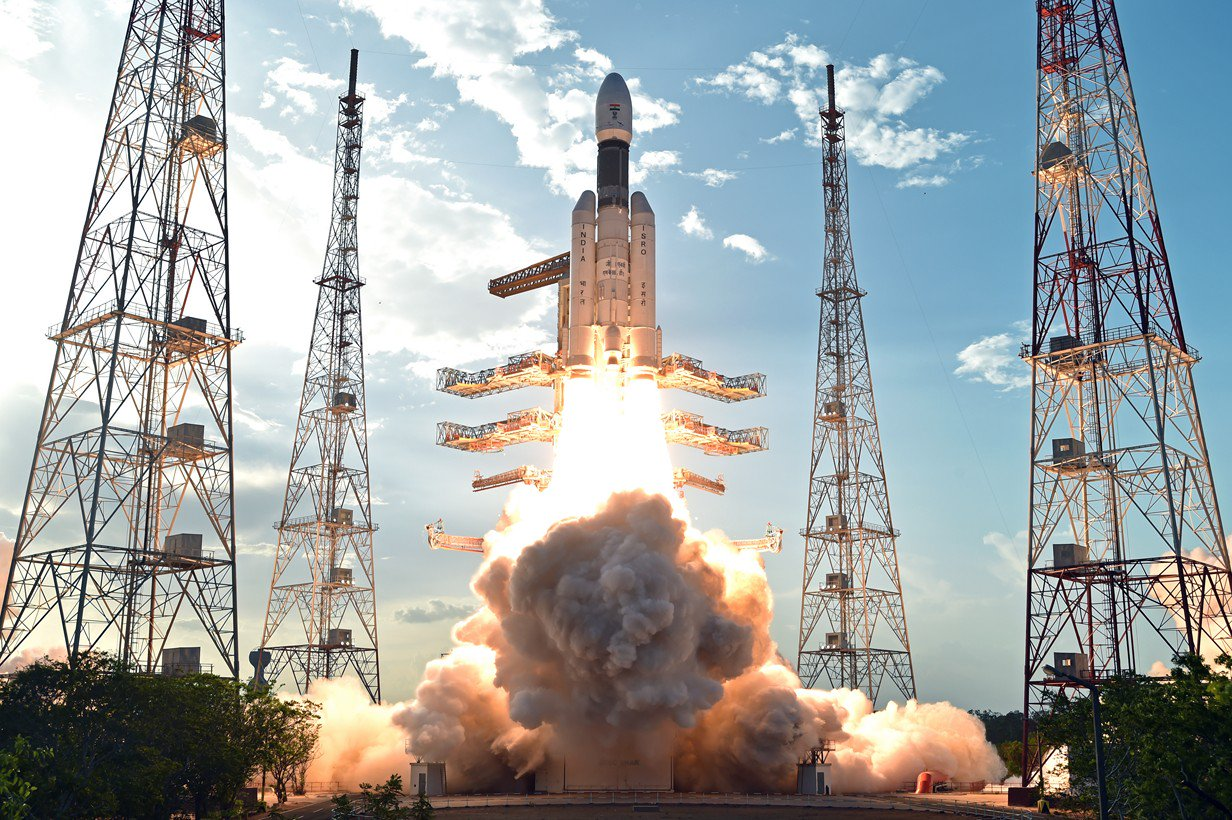
Geosynchronous Satellite Launch Vehicle Mark III is intended as a launch vehicle for crewed missions under the Indian Human Spaceflight Programme announced in Prime Minister Modi's 2018 Independence Day speech.

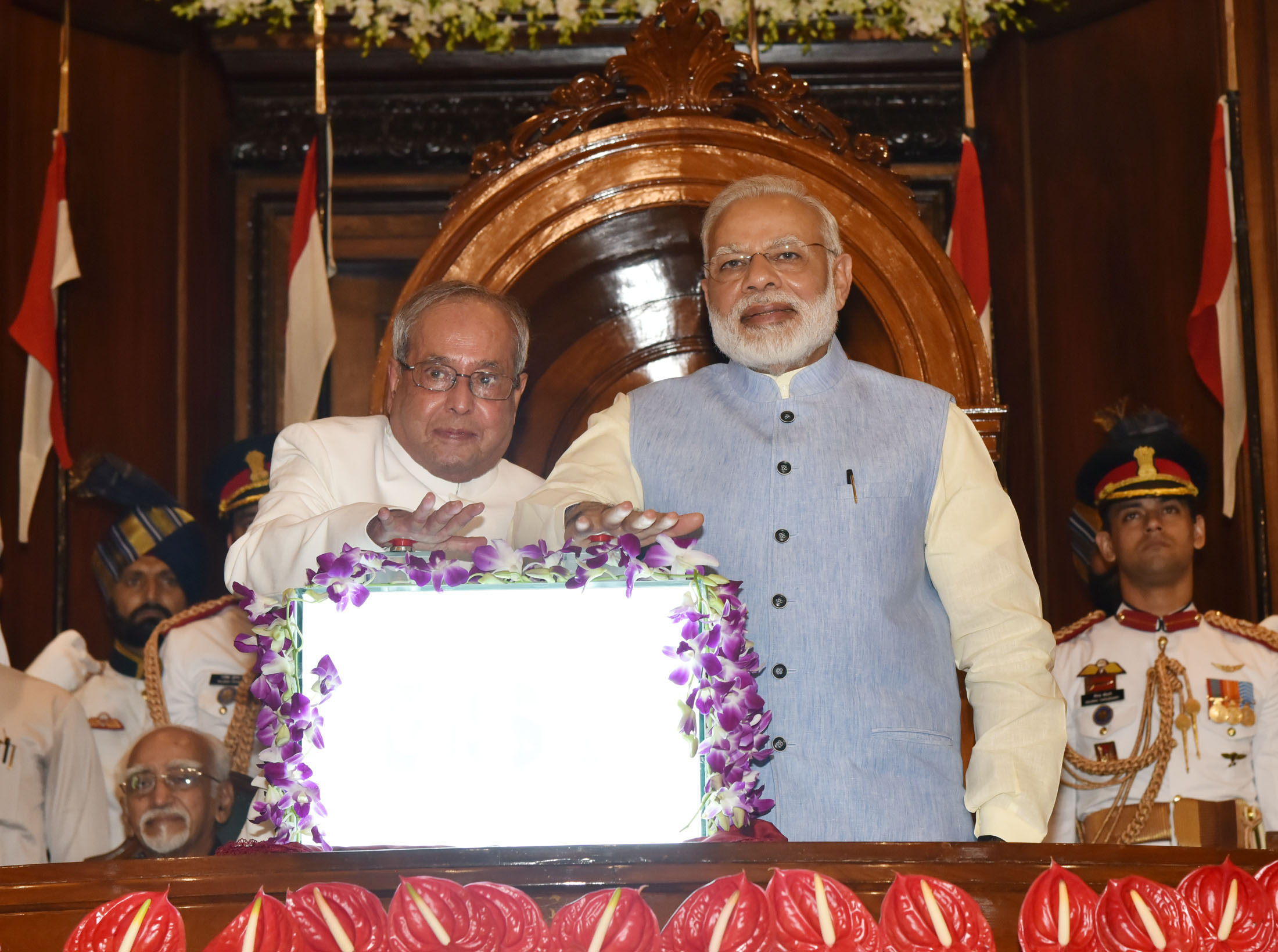
President of India Pranab Mukherjee and Prime Minister Narendra Modi pressing the ceremonial buzzer to launch the Goods and Services Tax (GST) in the Central Hall of Parliament, New Delhi, at the midnight of 30 June–1 July 2017

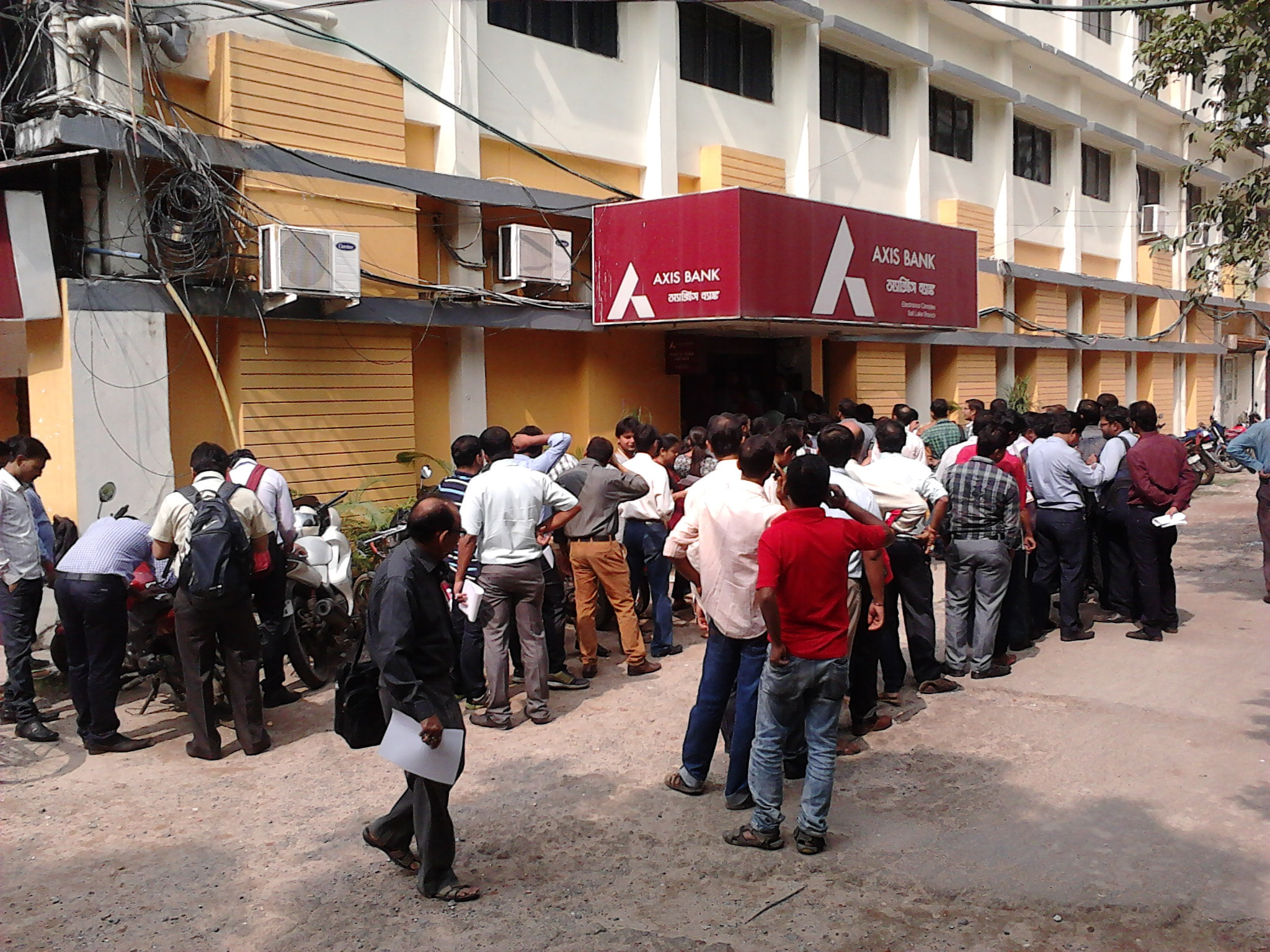
Queues outside a bank to exchange demonetised banknotes in Kolkata on 10 November 2016

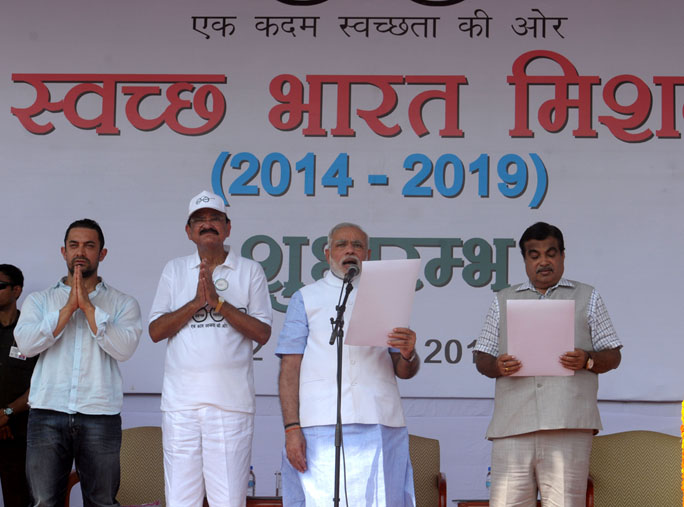
Narendra Modi at the launch of the Swachh Bharat Mission

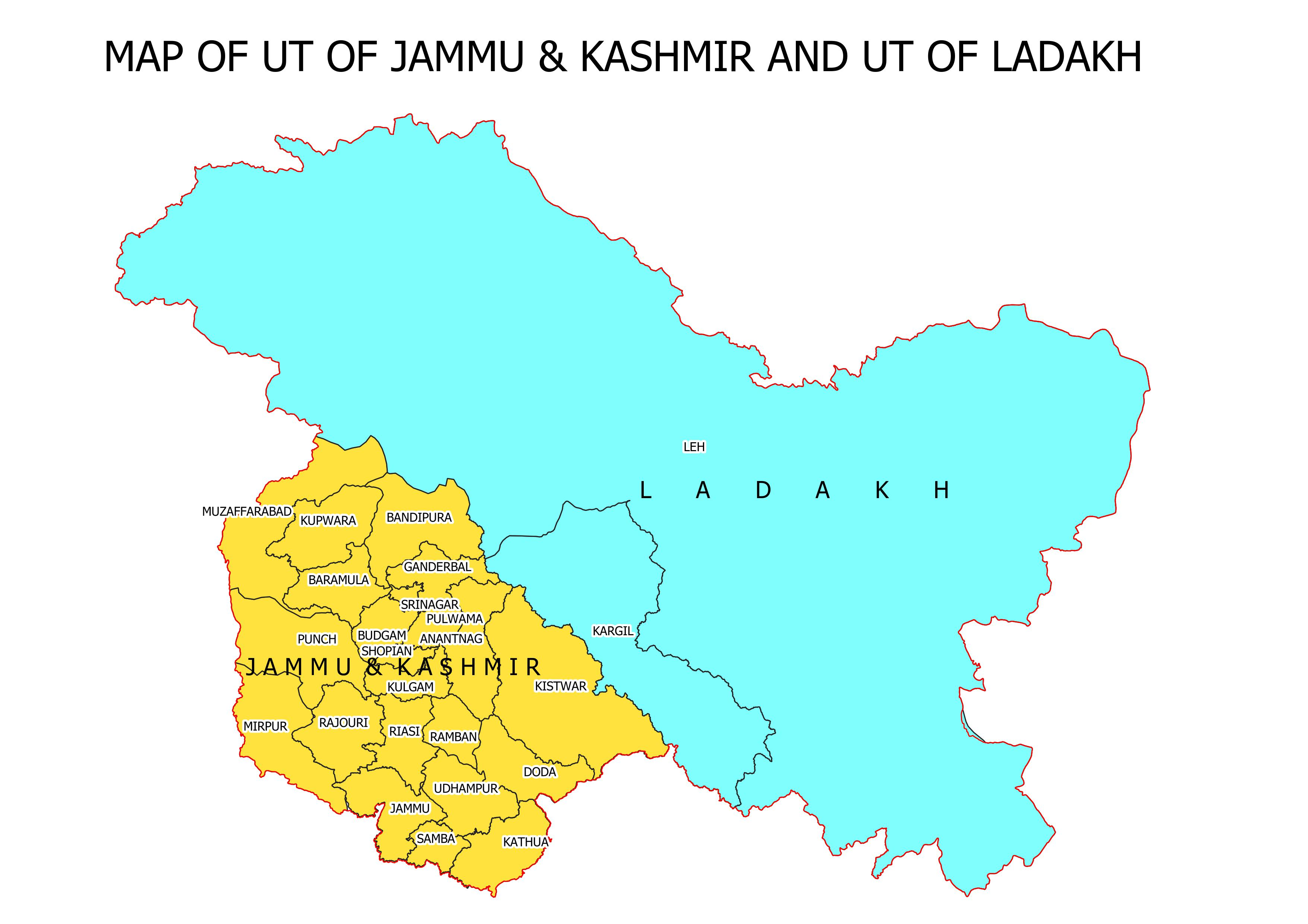
New map of the union territory of Jammu and Kashmir and Ladakh after the Jammu and Kashmir Reorganisation Act, 2019

== 2020s ==
In February 2020, riots broke out in Delhi. The Citizenship Amendment Act protests have been described as an instigating factor. Tensions escalated on the Indo-China border after aggressive skirmishes between Indian and Chinese troops beginning on 5 May 2020. Clashes turned fatal on 15-16 June 2020 when 20 Indian and 4 Chinese soldiers were killed in clashes along the Line of Actual Control in the Galwan Valley. The Rama Janmabhoomi temple construction officially started after a Bhoomi Poojan (Hindu ground breaking) ceremony by Prime Minister Modi on 5 August 2020. Farm reform laws which subsequently became quite controversial were passed in Parliament with less than three hours of debate in either house in September 2020.

In November 2020, a series of border skirmishes broke out between India and Pakistan along the Line of Control which killed at least 22 people including 11 civilians. The fight ended on 25 February 2021 with a ceasefire agreement.

After a year long protests by farmers, Prime minister Modi in November 2021 repealed the laws in three minutes in the Lok Sabha and nine minutes in the Rajya Sabha without debate.

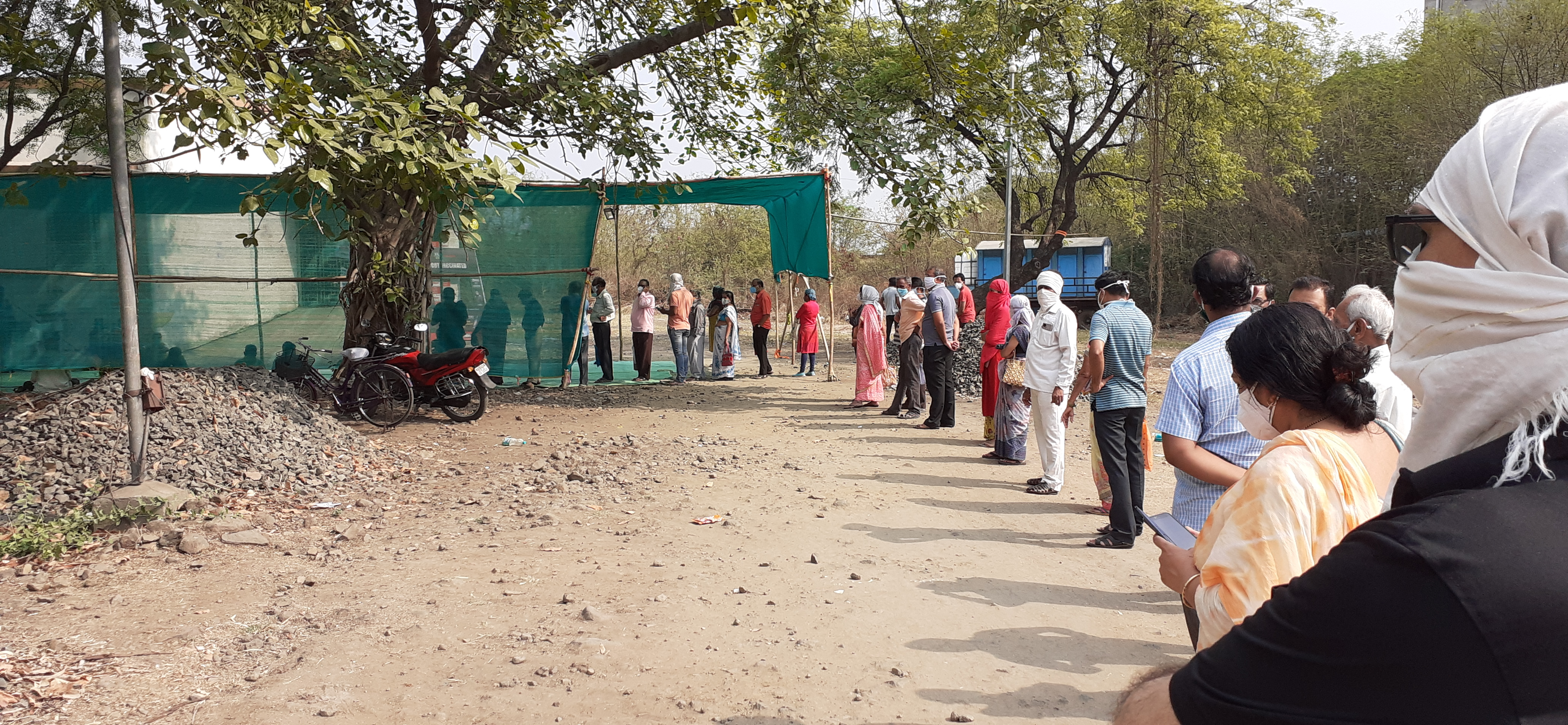
COVID-19 vaccination queue in Nagpur, 1 May 2021

=== COVID-19 pandemic ===
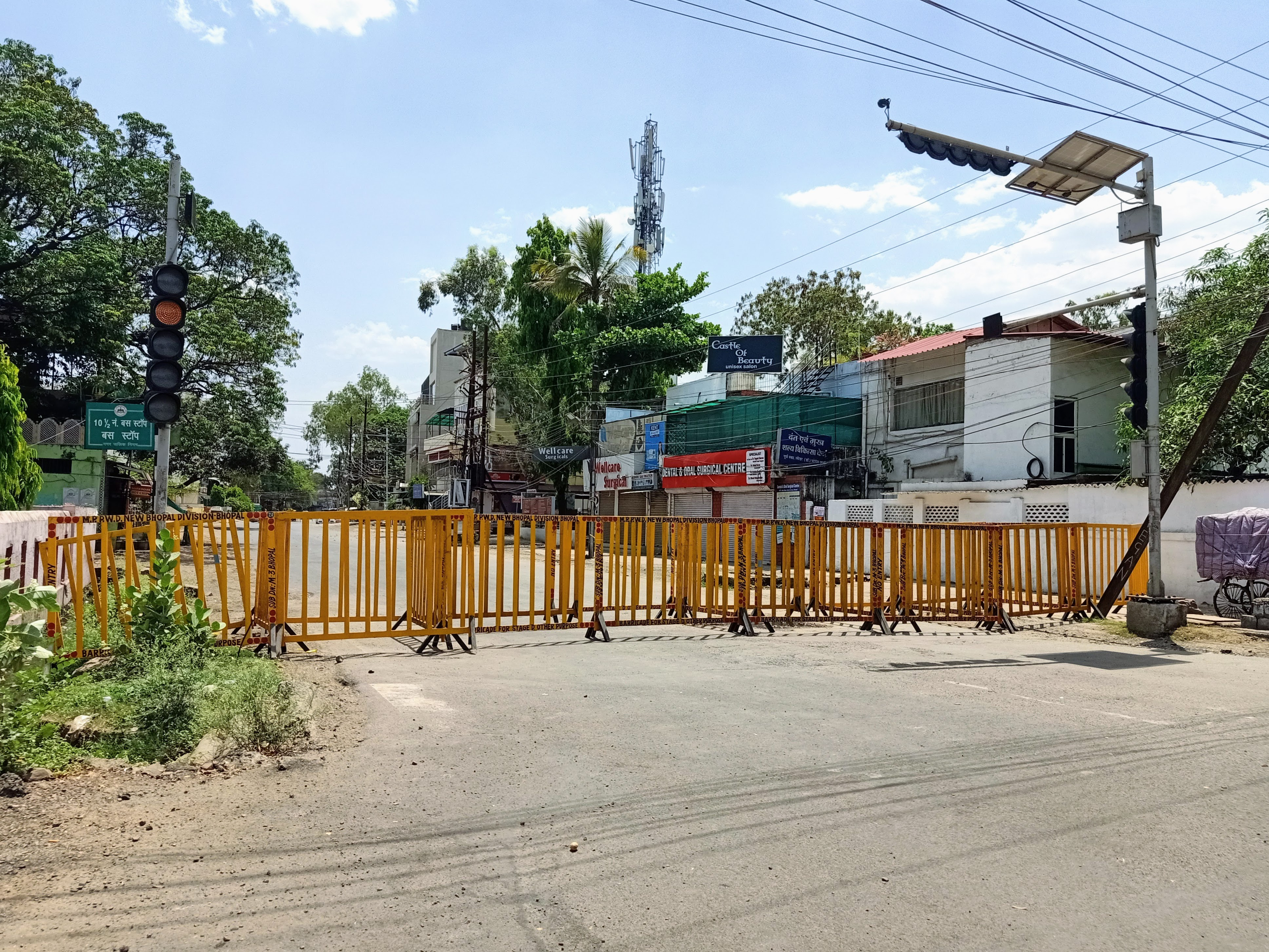
Image of barricaded streets in Bhopal during the COVID-19 lockdown.

The COVID-19 pandemic in India began on 30 January 2020, when the first case was reported in Thrissur. Two months later in March 2020, prime minister Modi imposed a complete lockdown in the country at four hours notice to stop the spread of COVID-19. This led to millions losing their jobs and many lost their lives. On 12 May 2020, Narendra Modi announced the Atmanirbhar Bharat Abhiyan in response to the COVID-19 pandemic. The Indian economy also shrunk in percentage terms by double digit numbers. In September 2020, India's health minister Harsh Vardhan stated that the country planned to approve and begin distribution of a vaccine by the first quarter of 2021. Vaccination against COVID-19 started in India on 16 January 2021. By early April 2021, second wave of infections took hold in the country with destructive consequences. According to Christopher Clary, assistant professor of political science at the State University of New York, technocratic competence had been entirely missing from government's response to the second wave of the COVID-19 pandemic in India. The second wave placed a major strain on the healthcare system, including shortage of liquid medical oxygen. The number of new cases had begun to steadily drop by late-May and vaccination gained momentum again. India administered 1 billion doses of COVID-19 vaccine on 21 October 2021. Although official number of Covid related deaths in India during the pandemic is less than half a million, excess mortality rates for all causes has been estimated at between 3 and 5 million deaths.

=== Post COVID-19 India ===
In June 2022, violent protests erupted throughout the country against the agniveer scheme introduced by the Ministry of Defence (India).

On 25 July 2022, Droupadi Murmu was sworn in as India's new president, becoming India's first tribal president. Although largely ceremonial post, Murmu's election as tribal woman was historic. India celebrated 75 years of its independence from the British Empire on 15 August 2022.

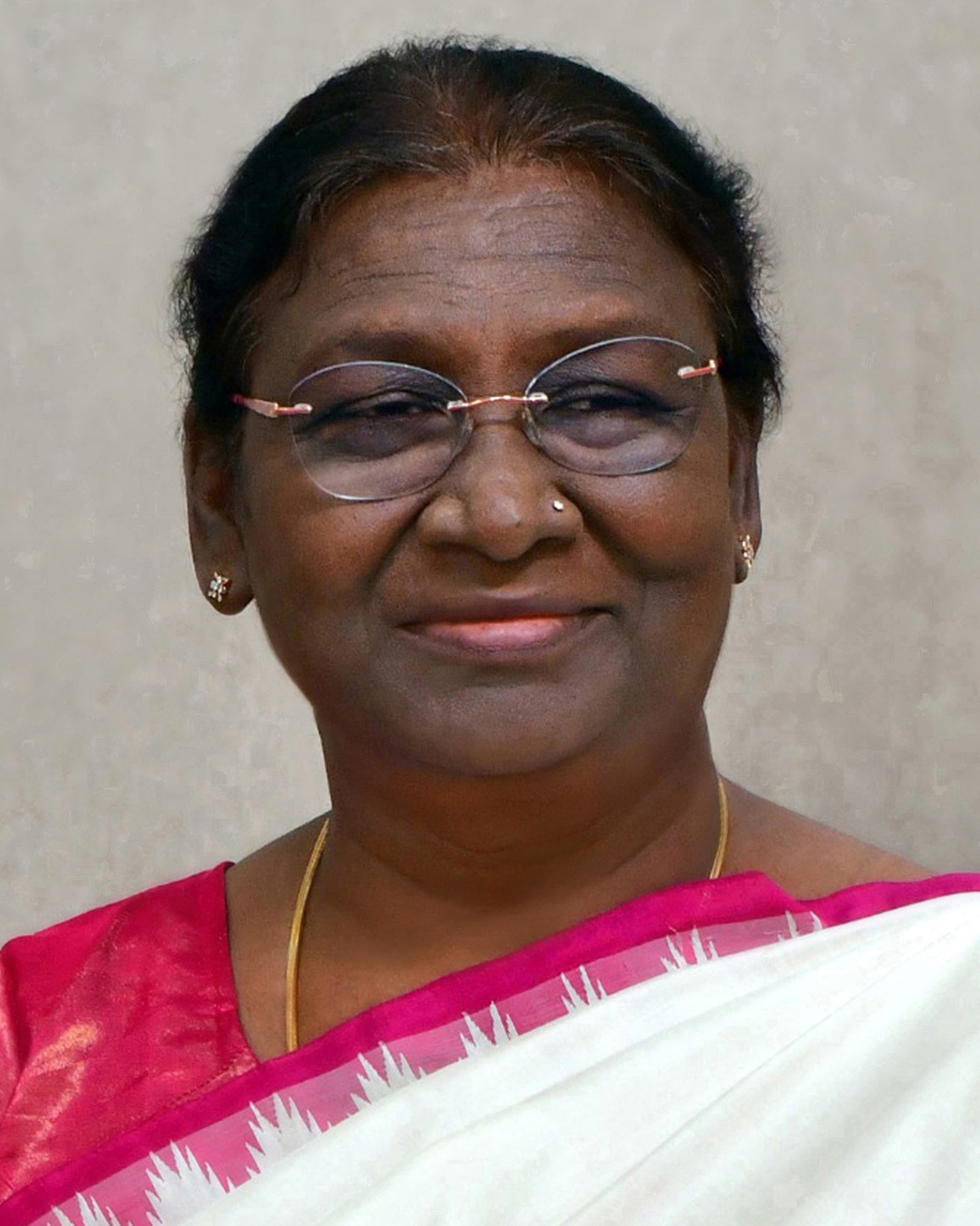
Potrait of Droupadi Murmu, India's first tribal president.

On 24 March 2023, Rahul Gandhi, the official opposition leader of India was disqualified as a member of the Lok Sabha after he was convicted by a Surat court in a defamation case filed by BJP MLA , Purnesh Modi. This led to protests as the opposition Indian National Congress called it a black day of democracy due to democratic backsliding in Modi's tenure. The defamation case was stayed by the Supreme Court of India on 7 August 2023.

In April 2023, India surpassed China to become the most populous country on the earth with a population of over 1.425 billion.

=== 2023 Manipur violence ===
On 3 May 2023, ethnic violence broke out in the state of Manipur between the Meitei and the Kuki people. International outrage resulted on 20 July 2023 when a video of two women being paraded naked on the streets of Manipur during the Manipur violence and were stripped and gang-raped by a heavily armed mob. On 10 August 2023, the Narendra Modi led NDA government won a second no confidence motion moved by the INDIA Alliance by a voice vote after a opposition walkout from the Lok Sabha in response to the Manipur violence.

The New Parliament House was inaugurated by Prime Minister, Narendra Modi on 28 May 2023 amid opposition boycott.

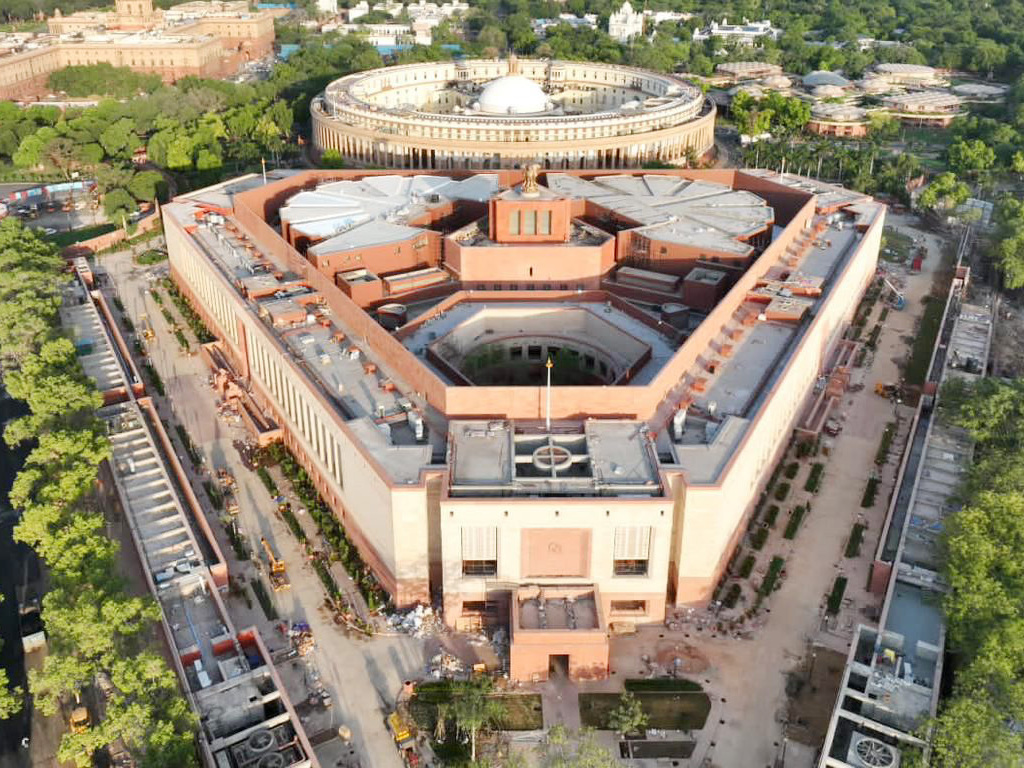
New Parliament House next to the Old Parliament House.

On 24 June 2023, Pakistan accused India of a ceasefire violation along the Line of Control when Indian Army fired in the Sattwal sector of Poonch District, Pakistan killing two shepherds and injuring one.

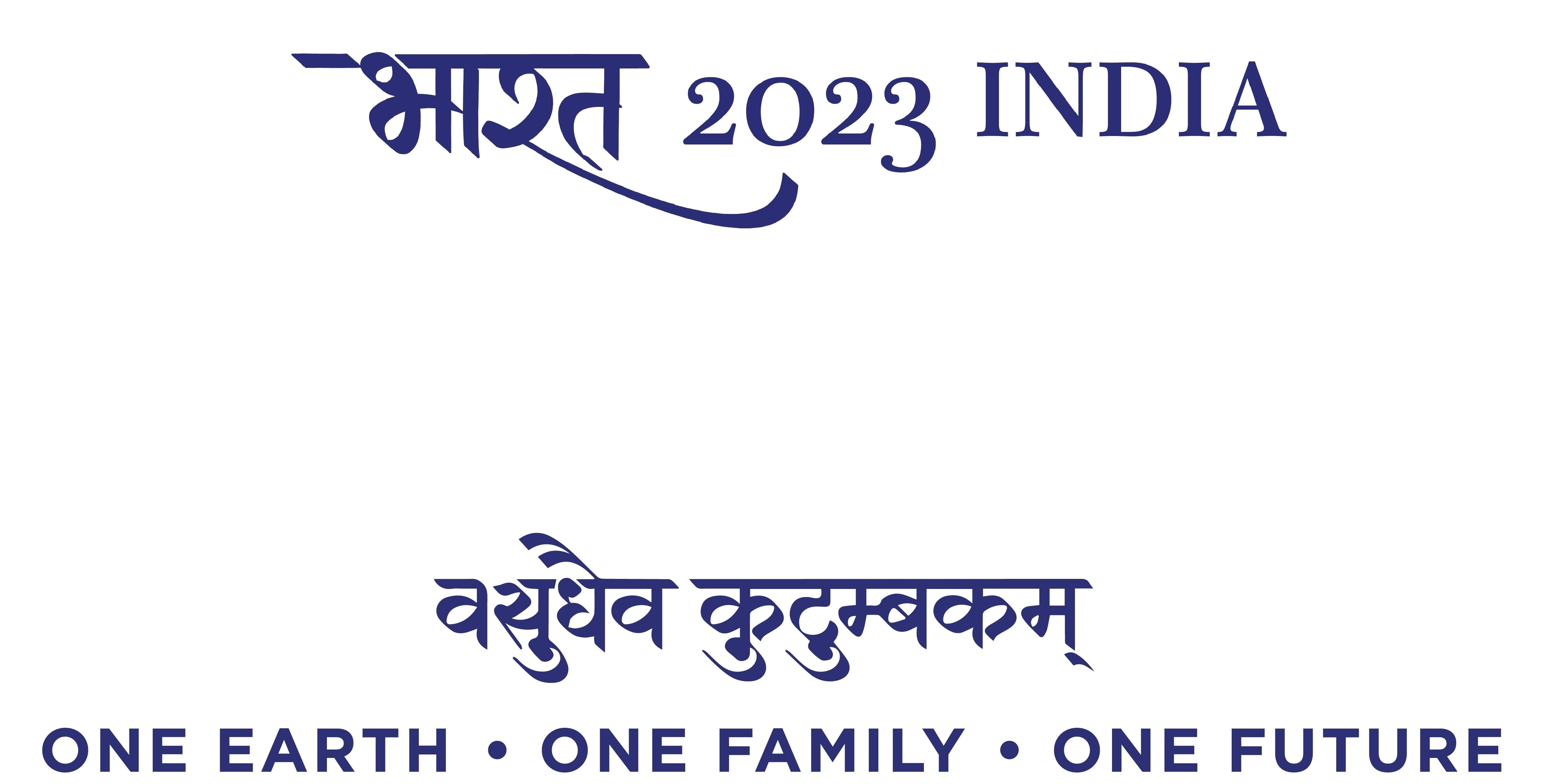
Theme of the 2023 G20 New Delhi summit.

India was selected as the host for the 2023 G20 New Delhi summit at the International Exhibition Convention Centre, Pragati Maidan, New Delhi from 9 to 10 September 2023.

Chandrayaan-3, a lunar lander developed and launched by ISRO landed on the Moon on 23 August 2023, thus making India the 4th country to land on the Moon after the Soviet Union, China, and United States.

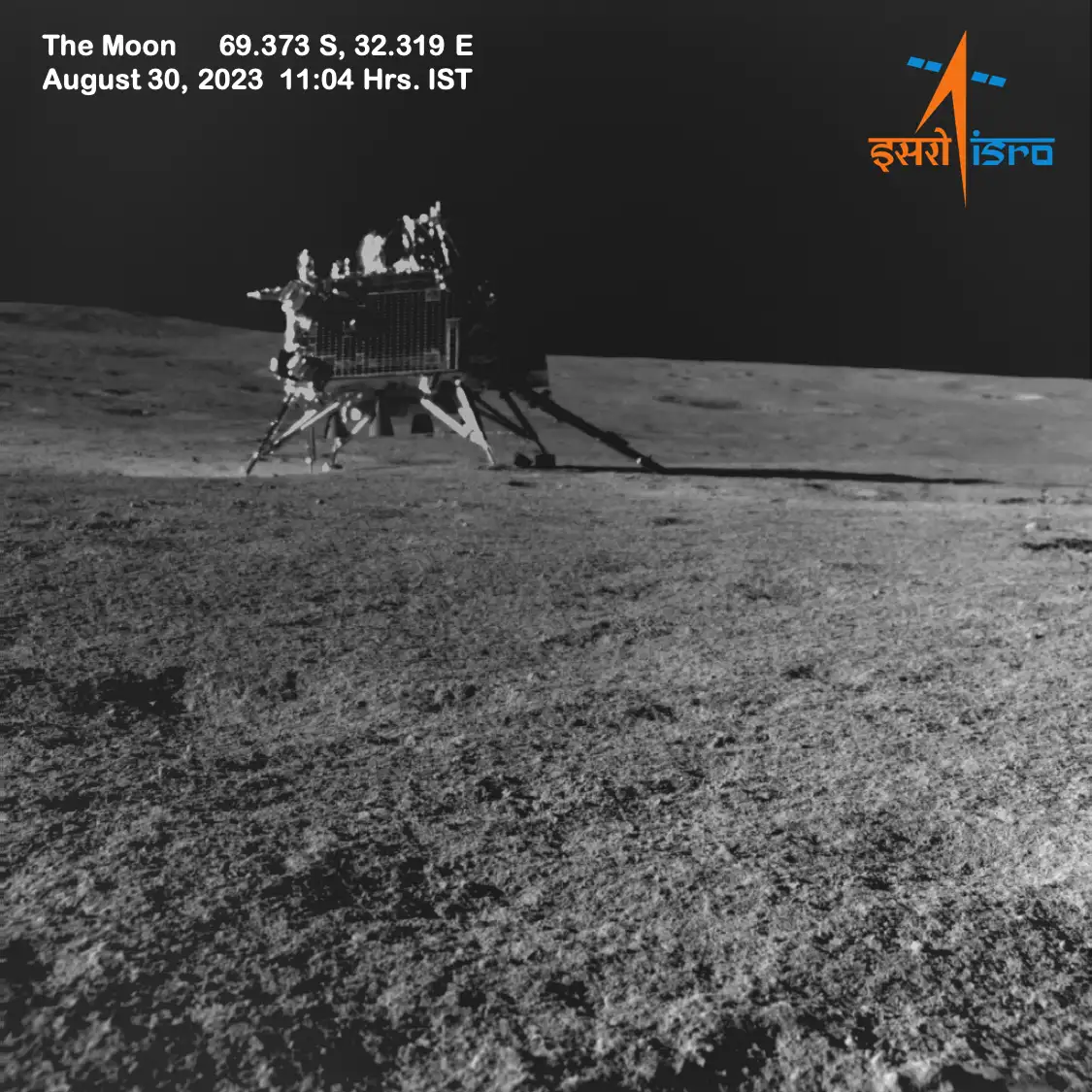
Image of Chandrayaan-3 that landed on lunar surface on 30 August 2023.

On 21 September 2023, the Parliament of India passed the historic Women's Reservation Bill which reserved one third of the seats in the Lok Sabha and other State legislative assemblies of India for women.

On 13 December 2023, a security breach took place in the Indian Parliament where two individuals entered the Lok Sabha chamber from the public gallery. One of the individuals jumped onto the tables where the Members of Parliament (MPs) were seated and released a yellow-colored smoke canister. The other individual allegedly chanted slogans. This caused chaos and panic within the house, leading to the immediate adjournment of the session. Two other individuals were detained outside the building. On 19 December 2023, a record 141 opposition members of parliament(MPs) (95 from Lok Sabha and 46 from Rajya Sabha) were suspended from the Parliament of India due to ruckus and unparliamentary behaviour over the 2023 Indian Parliament breach. The opposition called this as a "murder of democracy" and accused the government of reducing the parliament to a rubber stamp.

Three new criminal laws named the Bharatiya Nyaya Sanhita, 2023, the Bharatiya Nagarik Suraksha Sanhita, 2023 and the Bharatiya Sakshya Act, 2023 which aimed to replace the colonial criminal laws, the Indian Penal Code were passed in the Parliament of India without proper debate after a mass suspension of opposition members of parliament in December 2023 following the 2023 Indian Parliament breach. It came into effect as a law on 1 July 2024.

=== Ram Mandir Pran Pratishtha ===
On 22 January 2024, the Ram Mandir Pran Pratishtha inauguration took place in Ayodhya, Uttar Pradesh under the presence of Prime Minister, Narendra Modi.

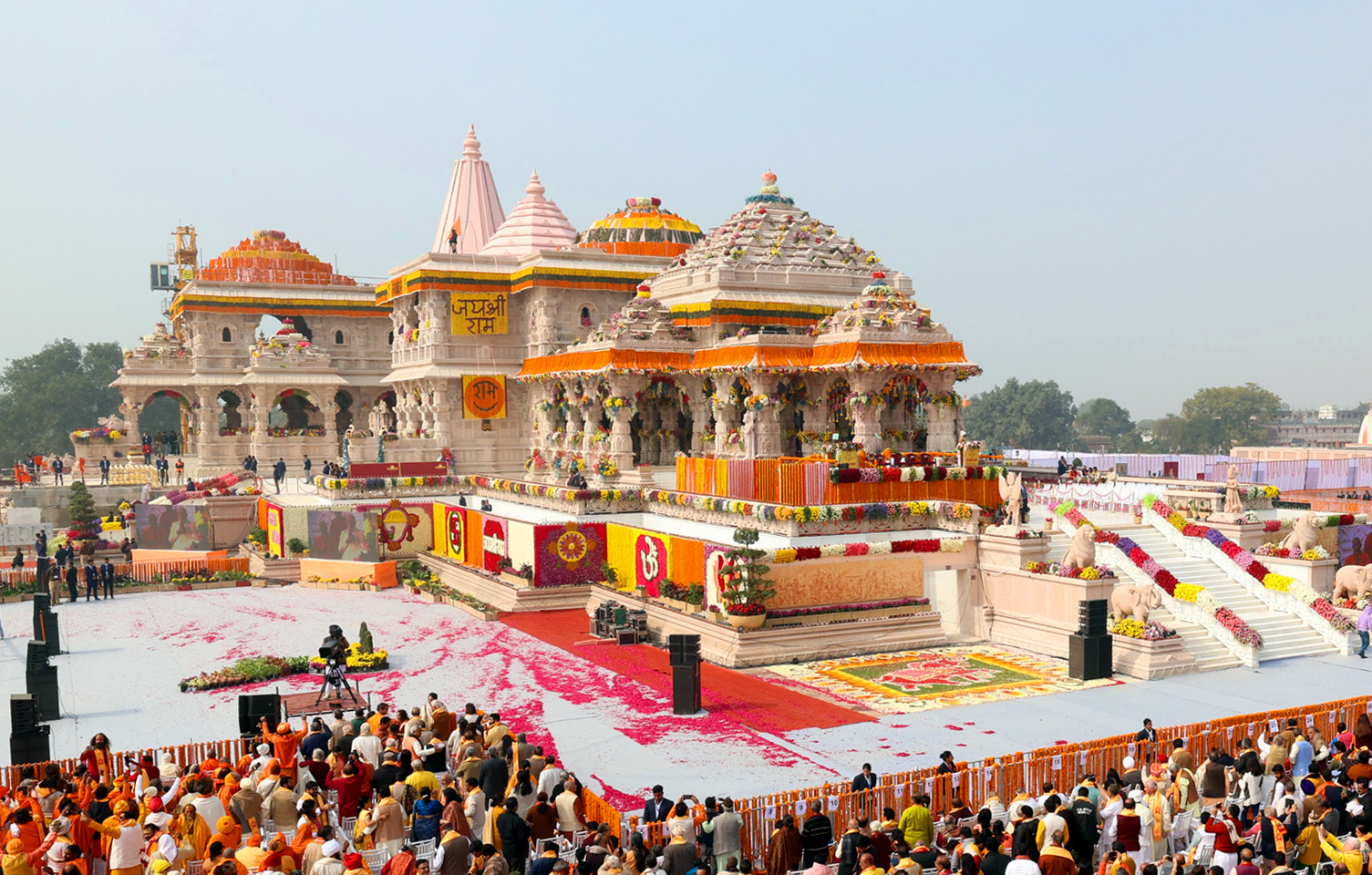
Ram Mandir Pran Pratishtha in Ayodhya on 22 January, 2024.

On 15 February 2024, the Supreme Court of India in a landmark judgement declared the electoral bonds scheme which was introduced by the Narendra Modi government in 2018 which is used as a political funding source for political parties of India as unconstitutional which violates Article 19 of the Constitution of India.

General elections were held in India from 19 April to 1 June 2024 in seven phases to elect the members of 18th Lok Sabha. The BJP won 240 seats, down from 303 seats it had secured in 2019, and lost its singular majority in the Lok Sabha. Modi confirmed the support of 293 NDA MPs to President Draupadi Murmu, which marked Modi's third term as prime minister and his first time heading a coalition government, with the Telugu Desam Party of Andhra Pradesh and Janata Dal (United) of Bihar emerging as two main allies.

In July 2024, a series of landslides broke out in Wayanad district, Kerala which killed at least 231 people and injured at least 397 people.

In August 2024, massive protests erupted throughout the country after the rape and murder of a 31-year-old female post-graduate trainee doctor at R. G. Kar Medical College and Hospital in Kolkata.

The Parliament of India passed the Waqf (Amendment) Act, 2025 on 5 April 2025 which sparked protests throughout the country and violent clashes in Murshidabad, West Bengal.

=== 2025 Pahalgam attack ===
On 22 April 2025, a terrorist attack took place in Baisaran Valley, Jammu and Kashmir which killed 26 civilians and thereby severely affected India Pakistan relations. In response to the attack, India suspended the Indus Waters Treaty, Simla Agreement, expelled Pakistani diplomats and called back it's diplomats, suspended visas, closed borders with Pakistan and ordered the deportation of Pakistani nationals in India.

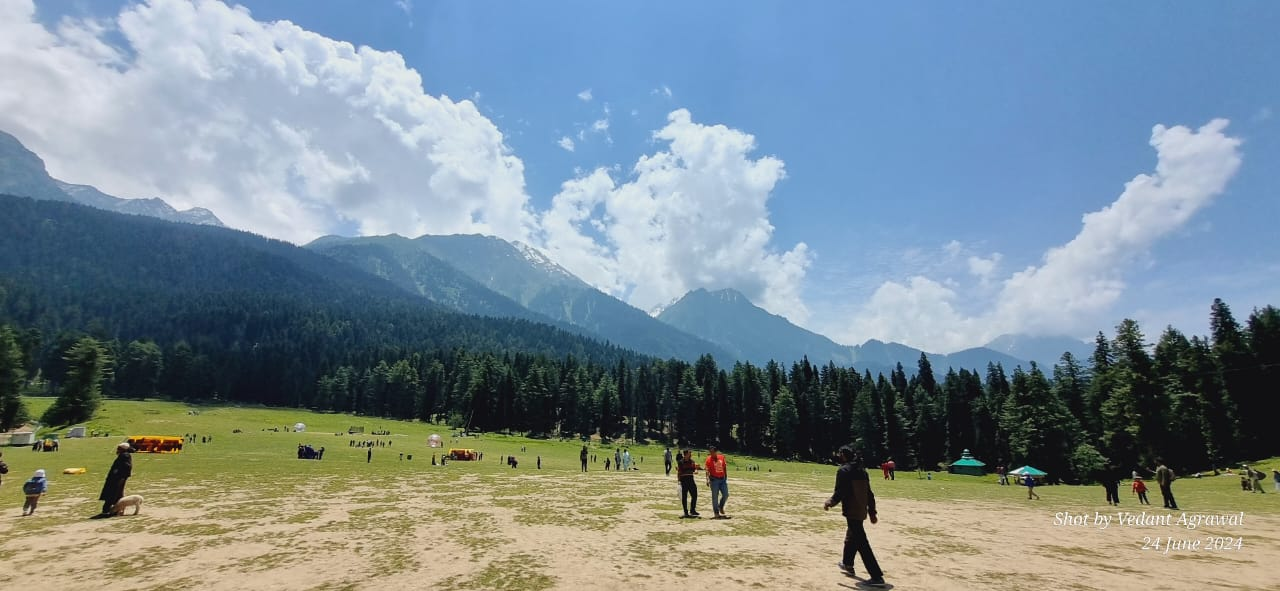
Baisaran Valley, the location where the 2025 Pahalgam attack took place.

=== Operation Sindoor ===
In retaliation, the Indian Army and the Indian Air Force launched surgical strikes codenamed Operation Sindoor at terrorist hideouts in Pakistan on 7 May 2025 in response to the Pahalgam attack. A 4 day long battle lasted between India and Pakistan which ended with a ceasefire on 10 May 2025.

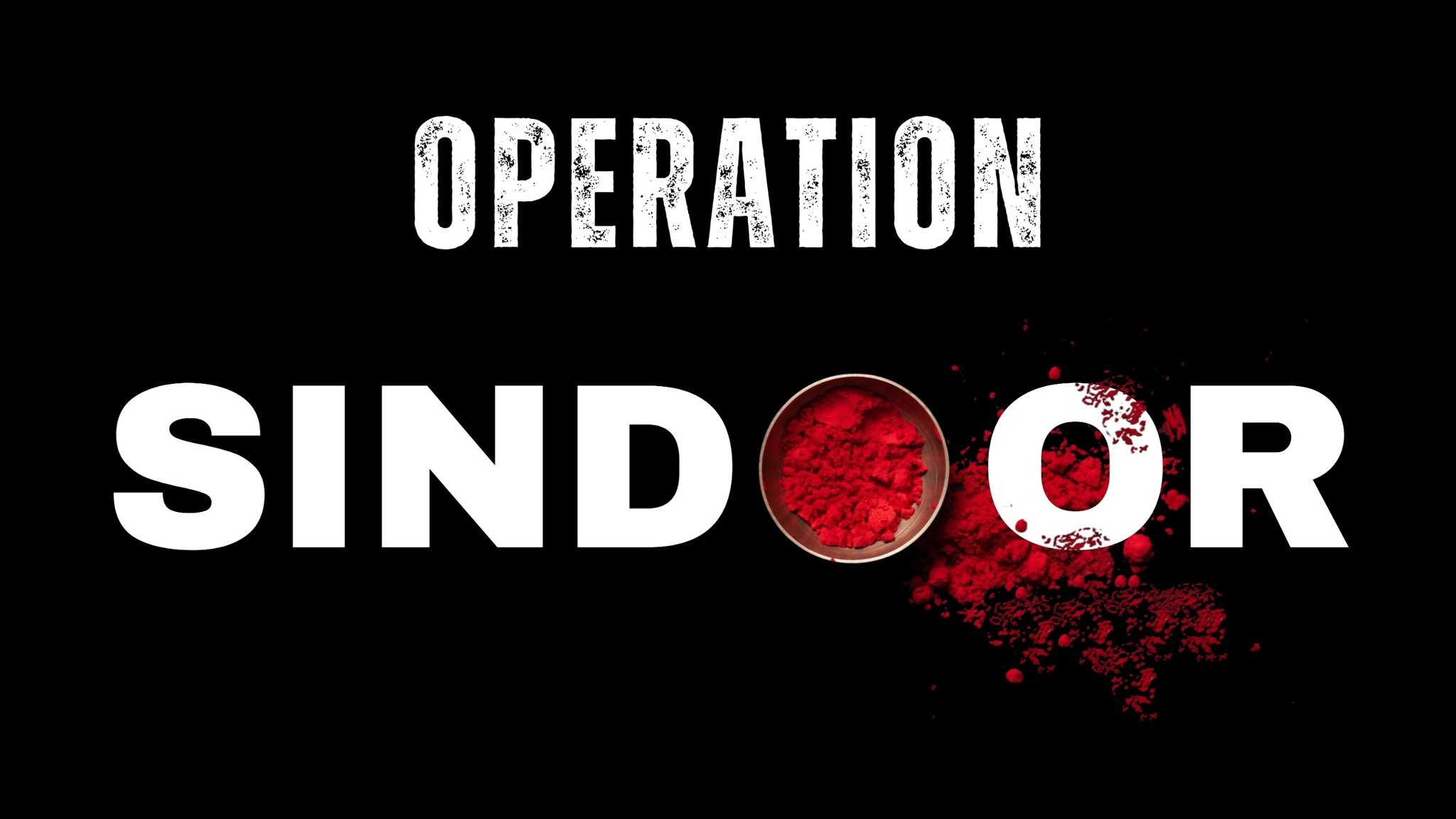
Image of Operation Sindoor carried out by the Indian Armed Forces in response to the 2025 Pahalgam attack.

On 21 July 2025, Jagdeep Dhankhar resigned as the Vice President of India due to health reasons. He is the first Vice President in independent India's history whose resignation triggered a midterm vice presidential election.

In August 2025, Rahul Gandhi, the Leader of the Opposition in the Lok Sabha accused the Election Commission of India of a systemic voter list fraud ('vote chori') in connivance to the BJP in multiple elections.

On 3 September 2025, the Indian Government announced GST reforms by reducing GST on many Indian goods to increase consumption and avoid the impact of Trump's tariffs on the Indian Economy. GST 2.0 rates were standardized, with uniform rates across the country namely 0% and 5% rate for Essential Goods & Services, 18% Standard rate, 40% rate for Luxury and Sin Goods which will be bought effective from 22 September 2025. With this change, the GST Structure was simplified with elimination of 12% and 28% GST rate slabs.

On 9 September 2025, C. P. Radhakrishnan was elected as the 15th Vice President of India. He took his oath of office on 12 September 2025..

On 10 November 2025, a car explosion took place near the Red Fort in Delhi which killed at least 15 people and injured at least 20 people. The Government of India termed the explosion as a terrorist attack and invoked provisions of the Unlawful Activities (Prevention) Act.

== Economy ==
The economic history of the India since 1947 can be divided into two epochs: 1.1947-91 which saw heavy government involvement in the economy, and a slow growth rate in GDP 2.1991–present which saw deregulation and a rapid growth in GDP, and reduction in poverty.

=== Pre-liberalisation period (1947–1991) ===
Indian economic policy after independence was influenced by the colonial experience, which was seen as exploitative by Indian leaders exposed to British social democracy and the planned economy of the Soviet Union. Domestic policy tended towards protectionism, with a strong emphasis on import substitution industrialisation, economic interventionism, a large government-run public sector, business regulation, and central planning, while trade and foreign investment policies were relatively liberal. Five-Year Plans of India resembled central planning in the Soviet Union. Steel, mining, machine tools, telecommunications, insurance, and power plants, among other industries, were effectively nationalised in the mid-1950s. The Indian economy of this period is characterised as Dirigism.

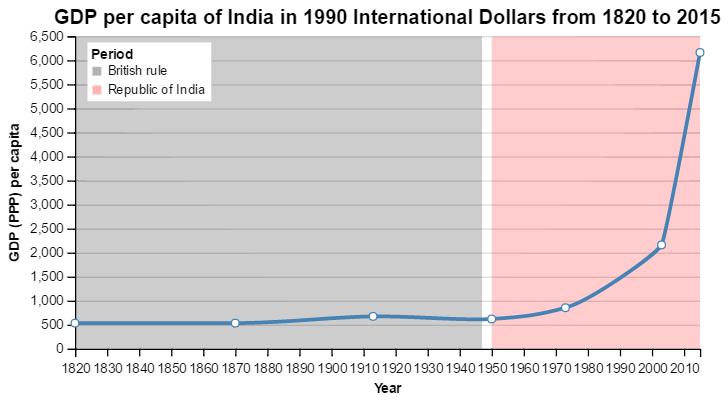
Change in per capita GDP of India, 1820–2015. Figures are inflation-adjusted to 1990 International Geary-Khamis dollars.

Jawaharlal Nehru, the first prime minister of India, along with the statistician Prasanta Chandra Mahalanobis, formulated and oversaw economic policy during the initial years of the country's independence. They expected favourable outcomes from their strategy, involving the rapid development of heavy industry by both public and private sectors, and based on direct and indirect state intervention, rather than the more extreme Soviet-style central command system. The policy of concentrating simultaneously on capital- and technology-intensive heavy industry and subsidising manual, low-skill cottage industries was criticised by economist Milton Friedman, who thought it would waste capital and labour, and retard the development of small manufacturers.

Since 1965, the use of high-yielding varieties of seeds, increased fertilisers and improved irrigation facilities collectively contributed to the Green Revolution in India, which improved the condition of agriculture by increasing crop productivity, improving crop patterns and strengthening forward and backward linkages between agriculture and industry. However, it has also been criticised as an unsustainable effort, resulting in the growth of capitalistic farming, ignoring institutional reforms and widening income disparities.

In 1984, Rajiv Gandhi promised economic liberalization, he made V. P. Singh the finance minister, who tried to reduce tax evasion and tax receipts rose due to this crackdown although taxes were lowered. This process lost its momentum during the later tenure of Mr. Gandhi as his government was marred by scandals.

=== Post-liberalisation period (since 1991) ===
The collapse of the Soviet Union, which was India's major trading partner, and the Gulf War, which caused a spike in oil prices, resulted in a major balance-of-payments crisis for India, which found itself facing the prospect of defaulting on its loans. India asked for a $1.8 billion bailout loan from the International Monetary Fund (IMF), which in return demanded de-regulation.

In response, the Narasimha Rao government, including Finance Minister Manmohan Singh, initiated economic reforms in 1991. The reforms did away with the Licence Raj, reduced tariffs and interest rates and ended many public monopolies, allowing automatic approval of foreign direct investment in many sectors. Since then, the overall thrust of liberalisation has remained unchanged since 1991, although no government had tried taking on powerful lobbies such as trade unions and farmers and on contentious issues such as reforming labour laws and reducing agricultural subsidies. By the turn of the 21st century, India had progressed towards a free-market economy, with a substantial reduction in state control of the economy and increased financial liberalisation. This has been accompanied by increases in life expectancy, literacy rates, and food security, although urban residents have benefited more than rural residents.

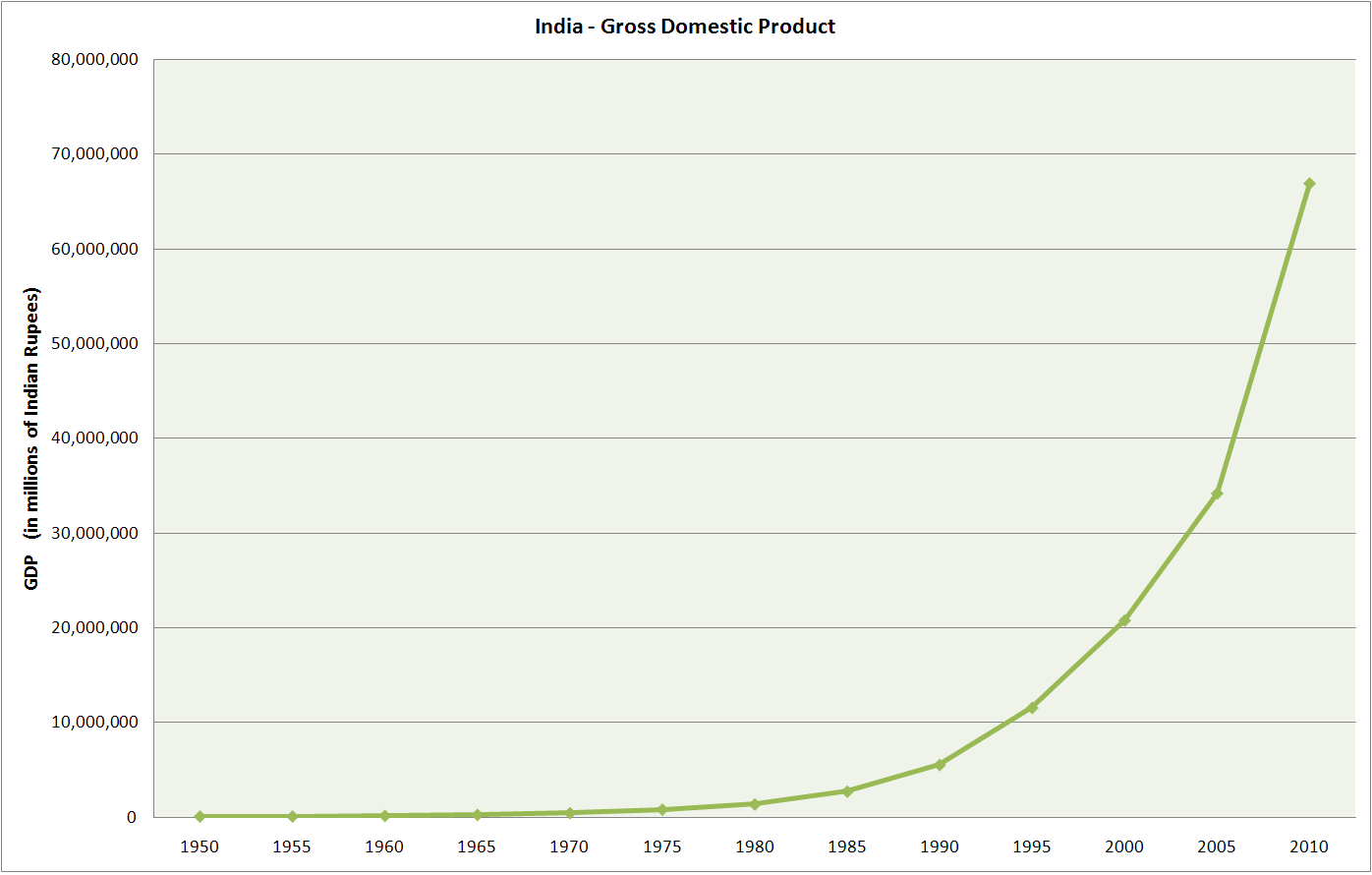
GDP grows exponentially, almost doubling every five years.

In the second decade of this century, the economy of India rose from the ninth-largest to the fifth-largest economy in the world by nominal GDP, surpassing the UK, France, Italy and Brazil. The economy had started to slow down in the second term of Manmohan Singh's tenure but started a recovery in 2013–14 when the GDP growth rate accelerated to 6.4% from the previous year's 5.5%. The acceleration continued through 2014–15 and 2015–16 with growth rates of 7.5% and 8.0% respectively in the early early years under Narendra Modi's first term. However the growth rate subsequently decelerated, to 7.1% and 6.6% in 2016–17 and 2017–18 respectively, partly because of the disruptive effects of 2016 Indian banknote demonetisation and the Goods and Services Tax (India).

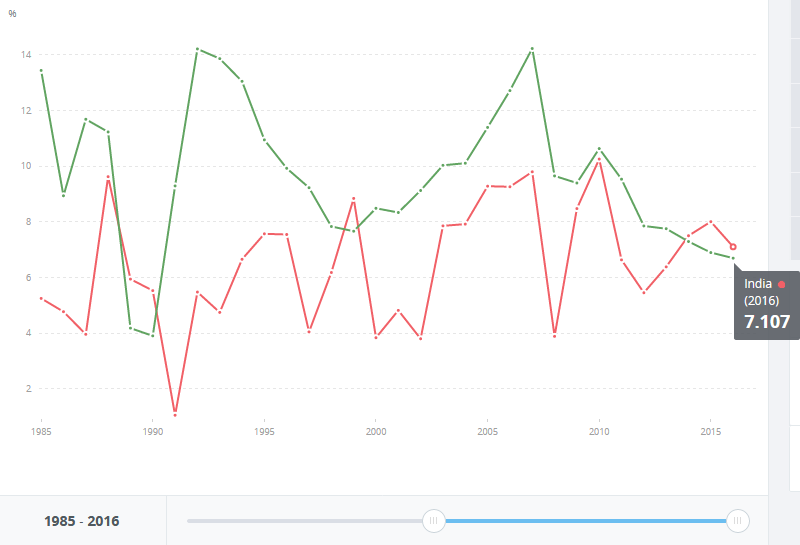
Indian GDP growth rate from 1985 to 2016 in red, compared to that of China in green

==== COVID-19 pandemic and aftermath (2020–present) ====
During the COVID-19 pandemic, numerous rating agencies downgraded India's GDP predictions for FY21 to negative figures, signalling a recession in India, the most severe since 1979. The Indian Economy contracted by 6.6 percent which was lower than the estimated 7.3 percent decline. In 2022, the ratings agency Fitch Ratings upgraded India's outlook to stable similar to S&P Global Ratings and Moody's Investors Service's outlooks. In the first quarter of financial year 2022–2023, the Indian economy grew by 13.5%.

== See also ==
- States and union territories of India
- Nehru–Gandhi family
- Democracy in India
- Elections in India
- Government of India
- Judiciary of India
- Politics of India
- Territorial disputes of India
- Separatist movements of India
- Economic history of India
- Terrorism in India
- Military history of India
- Outline of ancient India
- The Emergency (India)
