= India–Pakistan border skirmishes =

India–Pakistan border skirmishes or India–Pakistan standoff may refer to these military conflicts on the India–Pakistan border, specifically the Line of Control in Kashmir:

- 2001–2002 India–Pakistan standoff
- 2008 India–Pakistan standoff
- 2011 India–Pakistan border skirmish
- 2013 India–Pakistan border skirmishes
- 2014–2015 India–Pakistan border skirmishes
- 2016–2018 India–Pakistan border skirmishes
- 2019 India–Pakistan border skirmishes
- 2020–21 India–Pakistan border skirmishes
- 2023 India-Pakistan border skirmishes
- 2025 India–Pakistan border skirmishes

== See also ==
- Indo-Pakistani wars and conflicts
- Sino-Indian skirmish (disambiguation)
- Indian War (disambiguation)
- 1971 war (disambiguation)
