= 2016–2018 India–Pakistan border skirmishes =

Series of armed skirmishes between India and Pakistan in Kashmir

- Part of the Indo-Pakistani conflict in Kashmir
- Map of the disputed Kashmir region, with Indian-administered territories shown in blue and Pakistani-administered territories shown in green
Date	28 September 2016 – 16 June 2018 (1 year, 8 months, 2 weeks and 5 days)
Location	Line of Control, Kashmir
Result	Status quo ante bellum

Belligerents
India: Indian Army; Indian Navy; Border Security Force	Pakistan: Pakistan Army; Pakistan Navy; Pakistan Rangers

Commanders and leaders
Ram Nath Kovind (President of India); Narendra Modi (Prime Minister of India); Nirmala Sitharaman (Minister of Defence); Gen. Bipin Rawat (Chief of Army Staff); Lt. Gen. Devraj Anbu (GOC-in-C, Northern Command); Lt. Gen. Ranbir Singh (DG, MilOps); Adm. Sunil Lanba (Chief of Naval Staff); K. K. Sharma (DG, Border Security Force)	Mamnoon Hussain (President of Pakistan) Prime Ministers: Nawaz Sharif (until 28 July 2017); Shahid Abbasi (1 August 2017 – 31 May 2018); Nasirul Mulk (caretaker: after 31 May 2018); Khawaja Asif (Minister of Defence); Rashad Mahmood (Chairman Joint Chiefs); Gen. Qamar Bajwa (Chief of Army Staff); Lt. Gen. M. Z. Iqbal (GOC, X Corps); Adm. Muhammad Zakaullah (Chief of Naval Staff); VAdm. Syed Hussaini (Commander, COMKAR); U. F. Burki (DG, Pakistan Rangers)

Units involved
Northern Command	X Corps; COMKAR

Casualties and losses
Per India: 56–61 servicemen killed; 53 civilians killed; 1 serviceman captured; Per Pakistan: 86–90 servicemen killed	Per Pakistan: 67 servicemen killed; 114–120 civilians killed; Per India: 240–242 servicemen killed

The 2016–2018 India–Pakistan border skirmishes were a series of armed clashes between India and Pakistan, mostly consisting of heavy exchanges of gunfire between Indian and Pakistani forces across the de facto border, known as the Line of Control (LoC), between the two states in the disputed region of Kashmir. The skirmishes began after India stated that it had conducted surgical strike against militant launch pads within the Pakistani-administered territory of Azad Jammu and Kashmir on 29 September 2016.

Pakistan rejected the reports that any deep strike had taken place, stating that Indian forces had only engaged in a gunfight with Pakistani troops at the LoC without crossing over into Pakistani territory, an engagement that reportedly resulted in the deaths of two Pakistani soldiers and the wounding of nine. Pakistan also rejected India's claims that there had been additional casualties. Following this, Pakistani sources reported that in the 29 September skirmish, at least eight Indian soldiers were killed while one was captured by the Pakistan Army. India subsequently confirmed that one of its soldiers was in Pakistani custody, but denied that the mentioned gunfight was linked to the surgical strike incident or that any of its soldiers had been killed in the hostilities.

The Indian operation was said to be in retaliation for a militant attack on an Indian Army base in Uri, in the Indian-administered state of Jammu and Kashmir, that left 19 Indian Army soldiers dead on 18 September 2016. Over the course of the next 20 months, India and Pakistan continued to regularly exchange fire across the LoC in Kashmir, resulting in dozens of military and civilian casualties on both sides.

== Timeline ==
=== 2016 – initial strikes ===
On 29 September, eleven days after the Uri attack, the Indian army reported it conducted surgical strikes against suspected militants in Pakistani-administered Kashmir. Lt Gen Ranbir Singh, Indian Director General of Military Operations (DGMO), said that it had received "very credible and specific information" about "terrorist teams" who were preparing to "carry out infiltration and conduct terrorist strikes inside Jammu and Kashmir and in various metros in other states". The Indian action was meant to pre-empt their infiltration. Indian media reported variously that between 35 and 70 terrorists had been killed.

Pakistan denied that such surgical strikes occurred. The Inter-Services Public Relations said that there had been only "cross border firing". Pakistani Prime Minister Nawaz Sharif condemned the "unprovoked and naked aggression of Indian forces", which he said resulted in the death of two Pakistani soldiers.

UN Secretary-General Ban Ki-moon said that the UN Observer Group in Pakistani Kashmir did not directly observe any "firing across the Line of Control" relating to the incident. The Indian envoy at UN Syed Akbaruddin dismissed this statement, saying "facts on the ground do not change whether somebody acknowledges or not."

Analyst Sandeep Singh, writing in The Diplomat, said that the operation is better characterised as "surgical strikes" involve striking deep into the enemy territory and typically using air power.

=== 2016 – Post-strikes ===
On 1 October, Pakistan said its soldiers had come under fire in Bhimber and they responded to the attack. Indian media stated that Pakistan had started the firing. 6 Indian civilians in Poonch district were reported to be injured in firing from Pakistani soldiers on 3 October. On 4 October, the Indian Border Security Force said it witnessed Pakistani-operated unmanned aerial vehicles (UAVs) flying close to the border, presumably to survey Indian positions. The same day, an Indian soldier was injured by Pakistani fire in the Naushera sector of Rajouri district in the Indian state of Jammu and Kashmir. Three to at least four Indian soldiers were injured on 5 October because of firing and shelling. Nine Pakistani soldiers were also reported to be injured in retaliatory fire.

Border skirmishes continued throughout the month of October. An Indian soldier was killed by Pakistani fire in the Rajouri District of Indian controlled Jammu and Kashmir on 16 October. One Pakistani civilian was stated to have been killed by Pakistani authorities while 12 others were stated to have been injured in firing by Indian forces on 19 October. On 21 October, the BSF said that it killed 7 Pakistan rangers, a militant and injured 3 other Pakistani soldier in retaliatory fire after a sniper attack by Pakistani forces injured an Indian soldier, Gurnam Singh in Hiranagar, who later succumbed to his injuries in hospital. The BSF claimed that the Pakistani media confirmed the "fatalities suffered by Pakistani rangers" with a news report that put the number of dead at 5. Pakistan's ISPR denied that any of its soldiers died and claimed that Indian forces resorted to unprovoked firing, which was dealt by Pakistani soldiers.

On 24 October, a BSF personnel and an Indian civilian were reported to have been killed in exchange of fire between both countries, while nine Indian civilians were reported to be injured. BSF also stated that four to five Pakistan Rangers were injured in firing from Indian side. Pakistani authorities also stated that 2 Pakistani civilians were killed in firing by Indian forces, with 6 civilians being injured.

Pakistani military claimed that it had killed 5 Indian soldiers and destroyed 4 Indian military outposts on 25 October. Pakistani authorities on 26 October alleged that two civilians were killed while nine others were injured in firing by Indian troops at the working boundary in Chaprar and Harpal sectors and on the LoC in Bhimber sector on 25–26 October. A BSF personnel was reported to be killed on 27 October in R.S. Pora sector while ten Indian civilians were reported to be injured along the International Border in Jammu region in firing by Pakistani forces. BSF claimed that it killed one Pakistan Ranger and injured another in retaliatory firing. 6 Pakistani civilians were killed and 22 were injured in firing by Indian forces at Shakargarh and Nikial sectors on the same day in a claim made 2 days later by Pakistani authorities. In addition, another two civilians were reported to be killed while nine others were reported to be injured in Chaprar, Harpal and Bhimber sectors.

Two Indian civilians were reported to be killed, while four civilians were reported to be injured in shelling by Pakistani forces on 28 October. A BSF constable was killed in an accident while retaliating to fire by Pakistani forces on the same day. Meanwhile, BSF claimed that 15 Pakistani soldiers had been killed in retaliatory fire. Three Pakistani civilians were reported to have been killed while five others were injured in firing by Indian forces on the same day in Nakyal sector.

According to a report by India Today, the Indian Army had destroyed a company headquarters and four military posts of the Pakistan Army on 29 October in retaliation to the beheading of an Indian soldiers by militants who were aided by cover fire from Pakistan Army. At least 20 Pakistani soldiers were reported to be killed in the attack according to the report.

A soldier was killed in Tarkundi area of Rajouri while a civilian was killed in Mendhar and another was injured in firing and shelling by Pakistani forces on 31 October. Pakistani authorities claimed on the same day that 4 Pakistani civilians were reported to be killed while 6 were injured in firing by Indian forces. 8 Indian civilians were reported to be killed in firing and shelling by Pakistan Rangers while 23 were injured on 1 November. The Indian Army stated that it had killed 2 Pakistani soldiers and destroyed 14 military posts in retaliation. 2 Indian soldiers were reported to be killed while two other soldiers and a woman were reported to be injured in firing by Pakistan Army who were trying to facilitate an infiltration bid on 5 November in Poonch district.

Pakistani officials stated on 7 November that three Pakistani civilians were killed while 6 civilians were injured in firing by Indian troops. On 8 November, three Pakistani civilians were killed while three were others were injured in shelling by Indian troops according to a senior police official of Poonch district. On the same day, an Indian soldier was reportedly killed while another was seriously injured in shelling by Pakistani troops in Nowshera sector. Another 4 Indian soldiers were also reportedly injured in shelling by Pakistani troops on the same day. The soldier who was seriously wounded in Rajouri succumbed to his injuries on the following day while another was killed in sniper fire by Pakistani troops in Machil sector of Kupwara according to an Indian Army official. On 9 November, Pakistani authorities stated that 4 civilians were killed while 7 were injured in firing by Indian troops in Khuirata and Battal sectors on the previous day.

An Indian soldier was reportedly killed in Keran sector on 11 November in firing by Pakistan Army while 6 soldiers were injured. Pakistani authorities stated on 14 November that 7 Pakistani soldiers had been killed in gunfire by Indian forces. General Raheel Sharif later claimed that they had killed 11 Indian soldiers on the same day in retaliatory firing. The Indian Army rejected the claim. On 17 November, Northern Command of the Indian Army said in a tweet: "No fatal casualties due to Pak firing on 14,15 or 16 Nov. Pak Army Chief claim of killing Indian soldiers on 14 Nov false."

On 18 November, the Pakistan Navy alleged that its warship had intercepted and prevented the covert infiltration of Indian submarine in Pakistan's seaborne territories on 14 November. The ISPR released the military video footage of the alleged Indian submarine patrolling in the Arabian Sea. However, Pakistan had not identified the type of submarine it claim to have intercepted. The Navy claimed that its warships had intercepted the incurring Indian submarine once it was detected on their military radars, and diverted the submarine from its course of actions. The Indian Navy strongly rejected the claims and termed Pakistan's interception claims as: "blatant lies". The Indian Navy also said that none of its ships are near Pakistan." An Indian Navy officer said in a statement, "Why would an Indian submarine surface or come to snorkelling depth near Pakistani waters?", Submarines are meant to be stealthy, and they do not reveal their presence so easily whether they are on intelligence gathering or in combat missions. Another navy officer stated that there are more than 150 ships in the northern Arabian Sea and the Persian Gulf of different nations including submarines of the China, "either the Pakistan Navy mistook some other nation's submarine as an Indian one or is just doing propaganda warfare." NDTV stated that, analysis of the video and the images released by Pakistani authorities does not indicate that the mast of the submarine which are visible in the images matches the mast of either India's Shishumar-class submarines, its Kilo-class submarines or its Chakra nuclear attack submarine.

On 18 November, Commander of X Corps of the Pakistan Army Lieutenant-General Malik Zafar Iqbal said to a selected gathering of Pakistani parliamentarians and journalists in Gilgit: "Only 20 of our soldiers embraced martyrdom" and claimed: "they [Indian Army] lost more than 40 soldiers".

On 19 November, the Pakistani military claimed that it shot down an Indian quad-copter type drone that had allegedly crossed the LoC into Pakistani controlled Kashmir. The same day, the Pakistani police said that four Pakistani civilians were killed in cross-border firing.

On 22 November, Indian reports said that militants or a Pakistani "Border Action Team" killed three Indian soldiers and savagely mutilated one of the bodies in Machhil sector of Kupwara district along the LoC. The Northern Command of the Indian Army said that "retribution will be heavy for this cowardly act". This was the second such incident of mutilation of an Indian soldier's body in the same sector since 28 October, when the militants mutilated the body of Mandeep Singh of 17 Sikh Regiment before retreating back into Pakistan controlled Kashmir under covering fire from Pakistan Army. Pakistan denied the accusation, calling it fabricated.

On 23 November the Indian army launched a massive attack. 120 mm heavy mortars and machine guns were used in the attack on Pakistani army posts. Artillery fire and shelling from India targeted several Pakistani villages and struck a passenger bus near the dividing line in the disputed region of Kashmir on Wednesday killing 9 civilians. Pakistan announced that it also killed 3 soldiers including an army captain. Two more civilians were also killed in another region of Kashmir. Pakistan military also claims 7 Indian soldiers have been killed in retaliatory fire, which was not confirmed by India. Following the incident, DGMO of Pakistan requested for unscheduled talks on hotline and complain about killing of civilians caused by Indian Army fire. During the talks however, the Indian DGMO, Lt Gen Ranbir Singh also complained to his counterpart about unprovoked firing by Pakistani forces to "provide insurgents cover fire while they (Insurgents) enter Indian Administered Kashmir".

On 29 November, Pakistan and India exchanged fire on the LOC north of Baramulla sector as well as in Uri sector. On 2 December, a Border Security Force trooper was wounded by a Pakistani sniper in Bhimbher Gali sector of Rajouri district. On 29 December, it was reported that Pakistan Army fired at Indian positions in Gulpur sector of Poonch district. No casualties were reported on the Indian side.

=== 2017 ===
On 13 February 2017, Pakistan Army's official public relations outlet, the ISPR stated that three Pakistani soldiers were killed in cross-border firing by Indian troops.

The Indian Army stated on 1 May that the Border Action Team (BAT), which is alleged to be made up from terrorists and soldiers of Pakistan's Army, killed and mutilated bodies of 2 Indian soldiers. Pakistan's government denied it.

On 11 May 2017, the two countries exchanged artillery and small-arms fire. Pakistan's foreign office stated that a civilian had been killed while 2 others were injured by Indian shelling in Subzkot in Azad Kashmir while the Associated Press reported that an Indian civilian had been killed in Nowshera.

On 13 May 2017, the Pakistani military said it destroyed several Indian Observation Posts at Noshera sector in response to recent Ceasefire violations by the Indian army in which several Civilians were injured.The DG ISPR also released a video supporting it's claim which showed Indian Military posts being shelled by Pakistani forces. The next day, Indian officials claimed that Pakistani shelling in Nowshera killed 3 Indian civilians and injured 9 others including a BSF officer.

On 23 May 2017, the Indian Army claimed it had "bombed" Pakistani army checkposts in Nowshera Sector along the border. An Indian military spokesman said the action was taken to prevent infiltration of militants into the Indian side. However, the Pakistani military swiftly rejected the claim as "false".

The Indian Army stated on 26 May that it had scuttled the attempts at a cross-border infiltration by BAT, killing 2 BAT terrorists. 2 days later it stated that an army porter was killed and another injured in firing by Pakistan Army in Keran sector.

On 29 May 2017, the Indian media reports, citing defence sources, said that special forces of the Indian Army foiled an attack by Pakistan's Border Action Team, killing 2 Pakistani soldiers along the Line of Control in Jammu and Kashmir's Uri sector.

On 1 June 2017, Livemint reported, quoting an Indian government official, that the Indian Army's special forces eliminated a Pakistani Border Action Team composed of five enemy soldiers along the Line of Control in the Muzaffarabad sector. On the same day one Indian civilian was also killed after Pakistani troops attacked Indian military positions along the line of control. On 2 June 2017, Indian military reported that one personnel of General Reserve Engineer Force (GREF) was killed and two Border Security Force (BSF) personnel were injured after Pakistani military opened fire on Indian military positions.

On 4 June, Pakistan's ISPR said that the military destroyed Indian bunkers during cross-border firing, in which five Indian soldiers were killed. It released video footage showing the Pakistani forces' destruction of the posts. However, the Indian Army denied the claim. "No casualties have been caused to our own soldiers in ceasefire violation along LoC," a senior officer of 16 Corps of the Indian Army said. "The claim of the Pakistan Army that it killed 5 Indian soldiers, destroyed bunkers in firing on LoC, is totally wrong," he said. Following hotline contact, the ISPR stated any Indian violations would be responded with "full force at the time and place of our choosing with the onus of responsibility on Indian aggressive behaviour." Dawn reported the number of Indian ceasefire violations in 2017 at over 400, crossing last year's 382. Pakistan's DGMO, Major-General Sahir Shamshad Mirza, said that Indian forces were killing civilians and inadvertent crossers of the LoC and labeling them infiltrators, which was "highly unprofessional and unsoldierly". He told his Indian counterpart to "look inwards" instead of at Pakistan for the unrest in Kashmir.

On 14 June, a cross border firing between Indian and Pak army, in Poonch and Rajouri area along LOC, left two Pak soldiers dead. On 16 June, An Indian soldier was killed by Pakistan army's cross-border firing on forward posts along the Line of Control (LoC) in Rajouri district of Jammu and Kashmir.

On 22 June, Pakistan Border action team (BAT) sneaked 600 metres across the LoC into the Poonch sector and killed two Indian soldiers. The same day, two Pakistani civilians were injured by Indian army's firing in Kotli district of Azad Kashmir.

On 25 June, Pakistan army cross border firing resulted in death of 1 civilian in Naushera sector. On 29 June, Indian military reported that two Indian soldiers were injured after Pakistan's army fired mortar, targeting Indian military positions along the Line of Control in Poonch district.

On 1 July 2017, a Pakistani civilian was injured by Indian army's cross border firing in Rawlakot, Azad Kashmir.

On 8 July, Indian officials reported that an on leave Indian soldier and his wife were killed and their three children were injured after Pakistani military opened fire targeting Poonch district along LOC. On next day of incident, Pande Rajiv Omparkash, SSP Poonch, said that Indian army destroyed a Pakistani checkpost.

On 10 July, Pakistan's ISPR said that Pak army responded with an attack that destroyed two Indian military posts and killed four of their soldiers.

On 12 July, two Indian soldiers were killed after a cross border firing by Pakistan army in Kupwara area along LOC.

On 15 July, an Indian soldier was killed by Pakistan army's cross border firing in Rajouri.

On 16 July, Indian army targeted one of the military vehicles of Pak army which eventually fell into Neelum River at Athmuqam along LOC resulting in deaths of 4 Pak army soldiers.

On 17 July, an Indian army men and a minor girl were killed while 2 other civilians were critically injured in cross border firing by Pakistan army along the Line of Control in Jammu and Kashmir on Monday in Rajouri's Manjakote sector.

On 18 July, two Indian army men were killed by Pakistan army's firing in Rajouri district. The deceased were rifleman Vimal Sinjali and Sepoy Jaspreet Singh. Around six Indian civilians were also reported to be injured as result of Pakistan's army shelling of hamlets and military posts along Line of Control.

On 19 July, an Indian army Junior Commissioned Officer (JCO) Shashi Kumar succumbed to his injuries. He was grievously injured as a result of Pakistan firing in Naushera yesterday. That same day, the Pakistan Army said that it targeted Indian military posts in retaliation to Indian army ceasefire violations the previous day. Pakistan Army stated that it had killed around five Indian soldiers in this attack.

On 21 July, an Indian Army soldier was killed in cross-border firing across the Line of Control on Friday by Pakistani army in Sunderbani sector of Jammu and Kashmir's Rajouri district.

On 8 August, an Indian soldier was killed by Pakistani fire in skirmishing along the Line of Control.

On 12 August, an Indian army Junior commissioned officer (JCO) and one Indian civilian were killed by Pakistani shelling in Poonch district of Kashmir.

On 13 August 3 Indian soldiers were injured in Pakistan firing in Uri Sector of Baramulla.

On 25 August, a BSF soldier sustained injuries when he was hit by a Pakistani sniper just below his right ear in the RS Pura sector. His condition was said to be stable. The next day, on 26 August, the BSF said that the Pakistani rangers started unprovoked mortar shelling at forward Indian posts in Dewra village of Rajouri's Sunderbani district and in retaliation it "shot dead at least three Pakistan Rangers".

On 1 September 1 Border Security Force (BSF) soldier was Killed in Pakistani Sniper Fire From Across Line of Control in Poonch.

On 13 September, Indian officials stated that three BSF troopers sustained injuries as result of unprovoked firing by Pakistani forces on BSF posts in Poonch and Jammu districts.

On 14 September, the BSF said it killed two Pakistani soldiers in retaliatory fire.

On 15 September, an Indian border guard was killed by Pakistani fire in skirmishing along the Line of Control.

On 17 September, One woman killed, 5 injured as a result of Pakistan army firing in Arina sector.

On 20 September, an Indian army soldier was killed in Keran sector as a result of Pakistan army firing.

On 22 September, the Pakistan military said that six Pak civilians were killed while 26 others including 15 women and 5 children were injured by Indian army's firing in Charwah and Harpal sector. That same day, Indian police officials said that the Pakistani forces violated the ceasefire first, injuring four Indian civilians.

On 2 October, the Indian Army said that two children were killed and a dozen civilians were wounded in "unprovoked and indiscriminate firing of small arms, automatics and mortars" by Pakistan soldiers in Poonch, where Indian troops killed 5 militants trying to infiltrate into India from the Pakistani side. Hindustan Times, citing an Indian Army spokesperson, said that Indian troops retaliated and the exchange of firing continued till afternoon.

On 3 October, an Indian Army soldier was killed when Pakistani troops violated the ceasefire along the LoC in Poonch.

On 4 October, the Press Trust of India (PTI) reported that three Indian soldiers sustained injuries when Pakistani troops opened "unprovoked and indiscriminate" fire at them. A Defence spokesperson said that Indian troops "retaliated effectively". That same day, the Pakistan Army said that two children were killed from Indian firing across the LoC. The Pakistan Army added that it was engaging Indian posts, and three Indian soldiers were reported killed in addition to five injured during retaliatory firing.

On 12 October, eight Indian Army personnel including two porters sustained injuries due to unprovoked firing by the Pakistani troops. An army soldier and a porter later succumbed to their injuries. A defence spokesperson said, "The Pakistan Army initiated unprovoked and indiscriminate firing of small arms and automatics from 1035 hours in Krishnagati sector along the Line of Control (LoC)."

On 21 October, Indian army porter was killed and a girl was injured in Baramulla district as result of ceasefire violation.

On 2 November, a BSF constable was killed in Samaba sector as result of ceasefire violation.

On 4 December, a Pakistani soldier was killed as result of ceasefire violation on LOC. The deceased was Juma Khan Bugti belonging to 47 Baloch Regiment.

On 6 December, a Pakistan Army Junior Commissioned Officer (JCO) on leave, Subedar Shaukat Kiani was killed due to Indian shelling in Abbaspur sector along with a civilian.

On 23 December, the Indian Army said that four Indian soldiers including an army major were killed in Keri sector in unprovoked firing by Pakistan. The next day, the Indian media reported that two Pakistani snipers were killed in Poonch and Rajouri districts. On 25 December, the Indian Army said that a team of 5–6 Ghatak commandos carried out a cross-LoC raid, during which they went around 250–300 meters inside the Pakistani side of the LoC, killing at least 3 Pakistani soldiers and injuring a few others. The Times of India cited a senior Indian Army officer as saying that intelligence inputs suggested that Pakistanis could have suffered more casualties. Pakistan rejected Indian media reports that Indian soldiers had crossed the Line of Control. Initially, the Pakistan Army said that the soldiers were killed by ceasefire violation, and the Foreign Office later said that India provided cover fire for "non-state actors" to plant improvised explosive devices that killed the soldiers.

On 31 December 2017, an Indian soldier was killed as a result of ceasefire violation in Nowshera sector.

=== 2018 ===
On 3 January 2018, a BSF head constable was killed as a result of ceasefire violation in Samba sector of Jammu and Kashmir.

On 4 January 2018, Pakistani media reported that three Pakistani civilians were injured as a result of ceasefire violation in Sialkot's Zafarwal sector. The Indian media reported that BSF had destroyed three Pakistani border outposts and two mortar positions killing 10-12 Pakistani Rangers.

On 10 January 2018, India reported that it had killed 138 Pakistani soldiers along the Line of Control during 2017, wounding 155 more. During the same time period the Indian government admitted that it suffered 28 soldiers killed in action and a further 70 more wounded in fighting along the Line of Control.

On 14 January 2018, an Indian army soldier was killed in Pakistani firing in Rajouri district.

On 15 January, the Indian Army said that it killed seven Pakistani soldiers, including a Major-rank officer and injured four others in retaliation. Additionally, the Indian army said it also foiled an infiltration bid, killing 6 Jaish-e-Muhammad militants. A senior Indian Army officer said, "Though we responded strongly and effectively on Saturday as well, we retaliated on Monday, resulting in seven fatal casualties and four injuries on Pakistan’s side in Janglote area across the LoC opposite Mendhar." The same day, the Pakistani army said that four of its soldiers were killed in Indian firing along the LoC in Jandrot, Kotli sector. It also claimed that it killed three Indian soldiers. The Indian Army denied any casualties.

On 18 January, India claimed that one BSF constable and a teenage girl were killed in shelling by Pakistani Rangers in RS Pura sector. Pakistan claimed that 2 civilians were killed and 5 others wounded in cross-border firing by Indian troops in Sialkot.

On 19 January, India claimed that one BSF and an Indian Army soldier were killed in ceasefire violations along the LoC in Samba sector in the Sunderbani sector of Rajouri district respectively. In addition, two civilians were killed in the RS Pura sector while eleven others were injured. In retaliation, Indian claimed to have killed 4-10 Pakistani Rangers and destroyed six Pakistani posts. Pakistan claimed that a man and a minor girl were killed in Bhimber district because of "unprovoked" shelling by the Indian forces.

On 20 January, India claimed that one Indian Army soldier and two civilians were killed in ceasefire violations in Poonch and Jammu districts respectively. Pakistan claimed that one Pakistan Army soldier and two civilians were killed in ceasefire violations by the Indian army in Nakyal sector of Kotli district. In addition, 5 civilians were reported wounded. One Indian army soldier who sustained injuries in Krishna Gati sector succumbed to his wounds on 24 January.

On 21 January, Pakistan claimed that two of its civilians were killed in a ceasefire violation in Nikial sector. India claimed that one Indian Army soldier and three civilians were killed in ceasefire violations in Mendhar and RS Pura and Kanachak sectors respectively.

On 22 January, India claimed that a 35-year-old woman was injured in cross border shelling by Pakistan. She was reported to have succumbed to her wounds on 28 January.

On 28 January, Pakistan claimed that three civilians were injured during ceasefire violations in Khuiratta, Kotli and Battal in Rawalakot.

On 4 February, four Indian Army soldiers were reported killed and one injured during cross-border shelling in Rajouri sector. Two other Indian soldiers were also reported injured by ceasefire violations in Poonch district. One soldier who suffered splinter injuries in Poonch district succumbed to his wounds on 12 February.

On 8 February, India claimed that one Indian civilian was killed as a result of ceasefire violations by Pakistan in Krishna Gati sector.

On 11 February, India claimed that one civilian was killed during a ceasefire violation in Pkukherni and Lairan villages of Noushera.

On 15 February, the Indian media, citing government sources, said that the Indian Army killed 20 Pakistani soldiers in retaliatory firing this year, while suffering 10 casualties of its own. The same day, the Pakistan Army claimed that it destroyed an Indian army post, leaving five soldiers killed and several injured. Pakistan reported that the "retaliative" strike took place hours after shelling from Indian troops hit a school van on the Pakistani side, killing its driver. India rejected Pakistan's claim as "totally false". A senior Indian Army officer said, "Unlike Pakistan Army, we do not, and cannot, hide our casualties."

On 19 February, Pakistani media reported that an eight-year-old boy was killed due to Indian firing across the LoC. The Pakistan Army claimed that it had neutralized an Indian army post killing two soldiers.

On 20 February, Indian Army claimed that in a direct fire assault they had destroyed a Pakistani post in the Tangdhar sector killing one soldier and seriously injuring another. Another Pakistani post was destroyed in the Haji Pir sector killing at least 2 soldiers.

On 28 February, Indian Army claimed that they killed two Pakistani soldiers in retaliation against ceasefire violations in the Bhimber Gali sector in Rajouri district. The Pakistan Army claimed that these 2 soldiers were killed in Indian firing.

On 2 March, Indian media claimed that two Pakistani soldiers were killed in retaliation by the Indian Army in Poonch district.

On 18 March, India claimed that five civilians were killed and two wounded as a result of Pakistan army shelling on Balakote sector of Poonch.

On 3 April, Indian army claimed that a soldier was killed and four wounded as a result of Pakistan army shelling in Krishna Ghati sector.

On 10 April, Indian army claimed that two soldiers were killed as a result of Pakistan army firing in Rajouri.

On 12 April, Indian army claimed that a soldier was killed as result of Pakistan army firing in Poonch's Krishna Ghati sector.

On 16 April, India claimed that an army porter was killed as result of Pakistan army firing in Baramulla district.

On 17 April, India claimed that a soldier was injured as a result of Pakistan firing in Rajouri and later succumbed to his wounds on 21 April.

On 23 April, Indian Army claimed that they killed five Pakistani soldiers and destroyed three Pakistani bunkers in Poonch and Rajouri districts in retaliatory fire.

On 26 April, Indian Army claimed that three Pakistani soldiers were killed in retaliation in Padhar sector, opposite Sunderbani, in Rajouri district. Pakistan Army claimed that two civilians were killed in Bramla village, Padhar Sector) during a ceasefire violation.

On 12 May, India claimed that a civilian was killed as result of Pakistan firing in Gulpur-Degawar area in Poonch district of Jammu division.

On 16 May, India claimed that a BSF soldier was killed as result of Pakistan firing on Mangu Chak border outpost on the international border. Pakistan also claimed that 1 of its civilian was killed as result of Indian firing

On 19 May, India claimed that a BSF soldier and four civilians were killed as a result of Pakistan firing in R S Pura and Arnia sectors of Jammu. Pakistan claimed that four civilians were killed in Indian firing in Pukhlian, Cahprar, Harpal, Charwah and Shakargarh sectors.

On 21 May, India claimed that a civilian was killed and six other wounded as a result of Pakistan firing in Jammu district. Pakistan claimed that a Pakistani Ranger was killed and three others wounded in Indian shelling of Badwal post in Charwah sector.

On 22 May, Pakistan claimed that a Pakistani Ranger and a civilian was killed in Indian firing in Shakargarh sector.

On 23 May, India claimed that five civilians were killed as result of Pakistani shelling in Jammu, Kathua and Samba district.

On 24 May, India claimed that had killed 8–10, injured 12 Pakistani Rangers and destroyed several posts in retaliatory fire during the past few days.

On 27 June, an alleged Partial footage of the strikes was released by the Indian government to the Indian media as proof to the strike. Pakistan's foreign office spokesman, however, rejected the alleged video and termed Indian claims as farcical.

=== 2018 – Ceasefire ===
On 29 May, India and Pakistan agreed to "fully implement" the 2003 ceasefire and stop cross-border firing. The ceasefire agreement was reached during a phone call between generals of both armies. Despite this, cross-border clashes continued until mid-June, during which seven more Indian soldiers were killed and eleven civilians were wounded. India also claimed to have carried out nine strikes which destroyed ten bunkers and posts of the Pakistani Rangers in Kanachak and Akhnoor sectors of Jammu district, killing at least five Pakistani Rangers and injuring three. The last confirmed death was of an Indian soldier on 16 June.

== Aftermath ==
Subsequently, the ceasefire along the Line of Control largely held, despite sporadic violations, leading to cautious optimism among Indian officials that it would continue.

Between early August and early September, Pakistan reported four civilians were killed in Indian cross-border shelling. In addition, India reported two civilian deaths due to Pakistani fire by the start of October and claimed that in retaliation its Army had killed two Pakistani soldiers. Despite this, during military talks between India and Pakistan that were held in mid-August, Pakistan expressed satisfaction on the measures being taken along the Line of Control by troops to maintain the ceasefire. Firing continued for the next months, after the end of ceasefire. From November to December, 7 Indian army soldiers were killed by Pakistani sniper fire from across the border. Indian media reported that there were 2,936 instances of ceasefire violations by Pakistan in Jammu and Kashmir in 2018.

== See also ==
- Indo-Pakistani wars and conflicts
- 2016 Uri attack
- India–Pakistan relations
- 2011 India–Pakistan border skirmish
- 2013 India–Pakistan border skirmishes
- India–Pakistan border skirmishes (2014–2015)
