= 2014–2015 India–Pakistan border skirmishes =

Series of armed skirmishes between India and Pakistan

India–Pakistan border skirmishes (2014–2015)
- Part of the Indo-Pakistani wars and conflicts and the Kashmir conflict
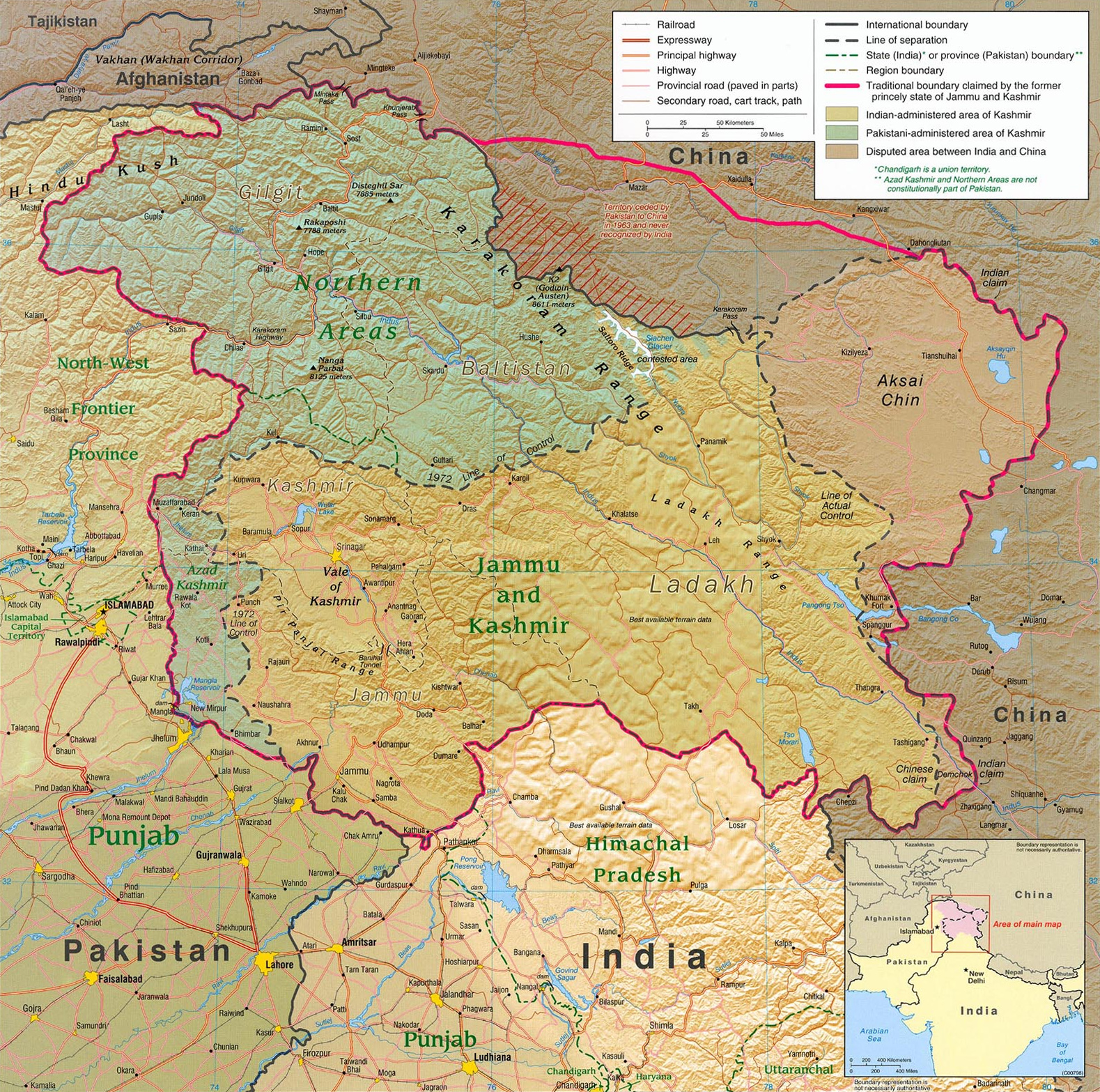
- The Map of Line of Control, 2014
| Date | 6 July 2014 – 2 November 2015 (1 year, 3 months, 3 weeks and 6 days) |
| Location | Line of Control and International Border |
| Status | Status quo ante bellum |

Belligerents
| India: Indian Army; Border Security Force | Pakistan: Pakistan Army; Pakistan Rangers |

Commanders and leaders
| Pranab Mukherjee; Dalbir Singh Suhag; D. S. Hooda; (India) Rajnath Singh; (India) Manohar Parrikar | Mamnoon Hussain; Raheel Sharif; (Pakistan) Qamar Javed Bajwa; (Pakistan) Naseer Khan |

Units involved
| IA Northern Command Border Security Force | X Corps Pakistan Rangers |

Casualties and losses
| Per India: 17 servicemen killed; 34 civilians killed; Per Pakistan: 4 additional servicemen killed; 1 UAV shot down | Per Pakistan: 7 servicemen killed; 53–54 civilians killed; Per India: 12 additional servicemen killed |

The 2014–2015 India–Pakistan border skirmishes were a series of armed clashes and exchanges of gunfire that first began between the India's Border Security Force and the Pakistan Rangers: the border patrolling forces of both nations, responsible for patrolling the India-Pakistan border), but quickly escalated in to exchange along the Line of Control (LoC) in the disputed Kashmir region between Indian Army and Pakistan Army. Tensions began in mid-July 2014, with both countries' military officials and media reports giving different accounts of the incidents and accusing each other of initiating the hostilities.

The situation deteriorated in October of that year, when Indian Minister of Defence Arun Jaitley urged Pakistan to stop "unprovoked" firing and warned that the response by India would be "unaffordable". On 12 October 2014, Pakistani national security adviser Sartaj Aziz, sent a letter to the United Nations secretary-general Ban Ki-moon appealing for a resolution of the crisis. Aziz said that officials from the United Nations Military Observer Group in India and Pakistan (UNMOGIP) were going to the disputed border region to observe ceasefire violations.

In September 2015, a Pakistani delegation headed by the Pakistan Rangers director general Umar Farooq, visited India for bilateral talks; Indian Border Security Force director general Devendra Kumar headed the Indian delegation. Both sides agreed to halt cross-border ceasefire violations. Indian Minister of Home Affairs Rajnath Singh told the Pakistani delegation, "Indian forces will not fire the first bullet along the international border." The Pakistani delegation raised the issue of the killing of a Pakistani Ranger by Indian BSF fire (which resulted in escalation and retaliatory fire), and the Indian BSF director-general pledged that no such incident would occur in the future. Both sides agreed to conduct joint investigations of future ceasefire violations and to strengthen border security; The Indian BSF and Pakistan Rangers agreed to improve communications.

== Timeline ==
=== 2014 ===
- In mid July one BSF soldier was killed after Pakistani Rangers fired upon Pittal border outpost along international border in Arnia forward area of R S Pura in Jammu district.
- 20 and 23 July: At least two civilians from Azad Kashmir were killed in Mirajkey during skirmishes between the Indian BSF and Pakistan Rangers.
- 22 July: An Indian soldier was killed in an exchange of fire by Pakistani troops at Indian positions on the Line of Control.
- 6 August: An Indian soldier after his boat capsized was swept into Pakistani zone (Sialkot) was arrested by Pakistani Rangers. He was freed and returned to India two days later.
- 23 August: Two Pakistani and two Indian civilians were killed after Pakistani and Indian troops exchanged fire in Kashmir.
- Early October: A 17-year-old girl was killed by Pakistani cross-border fire in Poonch district. Pakistani military officials accused India of violating the ceasefire and opening fire in Pakistani villages near Sialkot; Pakistani troops then retaliated.
- 6 October: Five Indian civilians were killed in a ceasefire violation by Pakistani troops in the Arnia belt of Jammu district.
- 8 October: Two women on the Indian side were killed as Pakistani troops targeted 50 Indian security outposts along the LoC.
- 9 October: Pakistani officials reported that nine civilians have been killed by Indian troops firing at and shelling the Charwa, Harpal, Bajra Gahri and Chaprar sectors of the border in Sialkot since 2 October.
- 9 October: Two Indian women were killed by Pakistani night fire.
- 11 October: Indian forces violated the ceasefire after a brief lull. Pakistani troops later violated the ceasefire in Arnia, targeting an Indian BSF outpost.
- 8 November: One Indian soldier and one civilian were killed by Pakistani troops in the Kamalkot area of Uri sector.
- 20 November: One Pakistani soldier was killed by Indian troops in a ceasefire violation in the Pandu sector near Muzaffarabad, Azad Kashmir.
- 31 December: An Indian BSF guard was killed by Pakistani fire in Jammu and Kashmir's Samba sector. Two Pakistani soldiers were later lost to Indian BSF fire in the Shakargarh sector of Narowal district. The soldiers were going to participate in a flag meeting with Indian Army soldiers when they were fired on by BSF paramilitary troops at Zero Point. BSF officials claimed that the firing was in retaliation for the previous day's incident, and five Pakistani soldiers were killed.

=== 2015 ===
- 2 January: A 13-year-old girl was killed in an Indian BSF ceasefire violation in a residential area of Zafarwal. Two Indian soldiers and one female civilian were killed by Pakistani Ranger fire. In retaliation, two Rangers were killed.
- 5 January: Four civilians were killed by Indian fire and shelling of Pakistani residential areas, including an 18-year-old from Bore Chak and a woman from Sukhmal village in the Zafarwal sector. Pakistani soldiers then fired on BSF posts, and a BSF soldier was killed at Hiranagar in the Samba sector of Jammu and Kashmir.
- 14 February: A sixty-year-old villager was killed by Indian fire in the Rawalakot sector of the Line of Control.
- 1 May: A Pakistani civilian was killed by Indian BSF troops in the Shakargarh sector.
- 5 July: A BSF soldier was killed in cross-border fire by Pakistani Rangers on six BSF outposts in the Arnia sector, near the Line of Control. The Indian Army returned an 11-year-old Azad Kashmir boy who had accidentally crossed the Line of Control.
- 9 July: A BSF soldier was killed by Pakistan Ranger fire on a BSF post in the Baramulla sector.
- 11 July: Pakistan Rangers returned the body of a Jammu man who had drowned in the Chenab River to the BSF.
- 15 July: An Indian civilian was killed by Pakistan Ranger fire on the Kanachak and Bhalwal Bharath areas of the international border.
- 15 July: The Pakistan Army shot down an Indian spy drone in Bhimber, Azad Kashmir. According to Inter-Services Public Relations, the drone was used for aerial photography. An Indian Air Force official denied the allegation. Jane's International Defence Review unmanned-systems editor Huw Williams said that a photo supplied by the Pakistani military appeared to show a Chinese-made DJI Phantom 3: "Due to its limited operating range — about two km — if the Indian military is using the system it would most likely be for close reconnaissance or security work". Pakistan summoned the Indian high commissioner in Islamabad about the issue. ISPR released images and video on 27 July indicating that the drone flew from an Indian post into Pakistani territory, including images from an Indian ASCOM office and of an Indian soldier and aerial views of Indian-sector outposts and company headquarters along the LOC. The next day, India rejected the Pakistani claims.
- 16 July: Five Pakistani civilians were killed by Indian Border Security Force fire in the villages of Malana and Salehpur in the Chaprar sector near Sialkot.
- 20 July: According to an ISPR statement, "The UNMOGIP visited areas most affected by recent Indian firing and were shown evidence of ceasefire violations". The team flew by helicopter to the Pakistani side of the boundary: "The UNMOGIP observers visited Saleh Pur, Chaprar and Malane in Chaprar Sector near [the] working boundary" at the Pakistan Army's request.
- 25 July: A Pakistani civilian was killed by BSF fire in the village of Polas in the Chirikot sector of Azad Kashmir.
- 30 July: An Indian soldier was killed by Pakistan Ranger cross-border fire at an Indian post in the Krishna Ghati sector of the LoC.
- 4 August: Two young Pakistani civilians were killed by BSF fire in Pakistani residential areas near the village of Sukhial. An Indian civilian was killed when Punjab Rangers fired at 12 BSF outposts in the Kanachak and Pargwal sectors of Jammu district.
- 7 August: An Indian toy bomb killed a child in Muzaffarabad of the Hillan sector.
- 9 August: A woman was critically injured by BSF fire in a Pakistani residential area of the Jandrot sector along the LOC. The 28-year-old woman from Kotli, Azad Kashmir was treated at the Combined Military Hospital in Rawalpindi, where she died on 11 August.
- 14 August: A woman was killed by Indian Army fire in the Nezapir sector.
- 15 August: Seven civilians, including five Indians, were killed by cross-border firing along the LoC.
- 16 August: An Indian woman was killed by Punjab Ranger fire in Poonch district, along the LoC.
- 17 August: A woman was killed by Indian BSF fire in the Nakyal sector of the LoC.
- 18 August: One civilian was killed by Indian BSF fire in the Nakial sector of Kotli District in Azad Kashmir.
- 21 August: United Nations observers visited villages in the Sucheetgarh and Charwah sectors along the Working Boundary which had been hit by Indian shelling.
- 22 August: A Pakistani civilian was killed by Indian BSF fire in the Batal sector.
- 25 August: An Indian Army JCO was killed by Punjab Rangers fire in the Nowgam sector of the LoC.
- 28 August: Three Indian civilians were killed and sixteen were injured by Punjab Rangers fire in the RS Pura sector of the LoC.
- 29 August: United Nations observers visited residential areas and villages affected by Indian shelling and fire for the third time. The observers visited the village of Kundanpur village in Sialkot, and reviewed damage from Indian BSF fire.
- 31 August: Three relief centres were established by the Pakistani district administration in the villages of Daallowali, Harpal-Balaarwali, and Panur. According to district officials, recent BSF shelling and fire had affected at least 50,000 villagers and displaced 40,000.
- 7 September: An Indian civilian was killed by Punjab Rangers fire in the Poonch sector of the LoC.
- 13 September: A BSF soldier was killed by Pakistan Rangers fire in the Rajouri district, along the LoC.
- 15 September: A Pakistan Rangers soldier was killed by BSF fire in Azad Kashmir's Battal sector along the LoC.
- 17 September: Three civilians were killed by Indian fire in the Nakial sector of Azad Kashmir, along the LoC.
- 18 September: A civilian was killed by unmarked-ship fire on the Okha coast in Gujarat. Unverified Indian media reports said that the Pakistan Navy fired on Indian boats. A 25-year-old Pakistani woman was killed by Indian fire along the LoC.
- 20 September: Four Indian civilians were killed by Pakistani shelling of Krishna Ghati, Hamirpur, Bhimber, Balakot and other areas near the LoC.
- 23 October: One civilian was killed by Pakistani Rangers fire in the Samba sector.
- 26 October: Two Pakistani civilians died as a result of BSF fire in the Shakargarh sector.
- 2 November: Two Indian Army soldiers were killed by Pakistani fire in the Gurez sector.

== Reaction ==
=== India ===
Indian Prime Minister Narendra Modi said in October 2014 that the government would not let the Indian people down and "everything will be fine soon". According to defence minister Manohar Parrikar, "If Pakistan persists with this adventurism, our forces will make the cost of this adventurism unaffordable". Home minister Rajnath Singh said that the Pakistan must stop cross-border ceasefire violations because "times have changed in India". Eighteen Pakistani militants were killed and 19 camps were reportedly destroyed in October 2014.

=== Pakistan ===
Pakistani military officials and the government accused India of violating the ceasefire and opening fire in Pakistani territory (after which the Pakistani military retaliated), condemning the October 2014 LoC violation by the Indian Army. Pakistani Defence Minister Khawaja Asif responded to his Indian counterpart, "We don't want to convert border tension between two nuclear neighbors into confrontation". On 12 October 2014, Pakistani National Security Adviser (NSA) Sartaj Aziz appealed to the United Nations to resolve the crisis. The UN declined Pakistan's request for intervention, saying that the dispute should be resolved with bilateral discussions.

Pakistan Rangers director-general Tahir Javaid Khan said that India fired nearly 30,000 mortar rounds between 2010 and 2014, and Indian ceasefire violations resembled a small-scale war. On 31 December 2014, National Security Adviser Sartaj Aziz sent a letter via the Pakistani embassy in New Delhi to External Affairs Minister Sushma Swaraj protesting India's "breach of trust" in their killing of two Rangers. In his response, Swaraj dismissed Pakistan's allegations. On 28 August 2015, Chief of Army Staff Raheel Sharif said that what he called the targeting of civilians was "highly unprofessional, unethical, irresponsible and cowardly."

=== United Nations ===
On 9 October 2014, a spokesperson for UN Secretary-General Ban Ki-moon issued a statement that Secretary Ban wanted India and Pakistan "to engage constructively to find a long-term solution for peace and stability in Kashmir".

== See also ==
- 2011 India–Pakistan border skirmish
- 2013 India–Pakistan border skirmishes
- Indo-Pakistani wars and conflicts
- Kashmir conflict
- 2016 Indian Line of Control strike
