= Armia (disambiguation) =

Armia is a Polish punk rock band.

Armia may also refer to:

- Joel Armia (born 1993), Finnish ice hockey player
- BC Armia, professional basketball club based in Tbilisi

== See also ==
- Arnia, Indian town
