= Indochine =

Indochine may refer to:

- Indochina (French: Indochine), a region in Southeast Asia roughly east of India and south of China
  - French Indochina, the part of the French colonial empire in Indochina
- Indochine (band), a French new wave/rock band, formed in 1981
- Indochine (film), a 1992 French film
- Indochine (restaurant), a French-Vietnamese restaurant in New York City, founded in the 1980s

== See also ==
- Indo-Chinese (disambiguation)
