= Indo-Chinese =

Indo-Chinese may refer to:

- Indochinese – of or pertaining to Indochina, a.k.a. Mainland Southeast Asia

Indo-Chinese may also refer to:

- China–India relations
- Chinese Indonesians
- Indian Chinese cuisine (often written "Indo Chinese")

== See also ==
- Indochine (disambiguation)
- Chinese Indian (disambiguation)
- Sino-Indian skirmish (disambiguation)
