= Sino-Indian skirmish =

Sino-Indian skirmish may refer to the following military clashes between India and China:

- 1959 Longju incident, near Arunachal Pradesh
- 1959 Kongka La incident, near Ladakh
- 1967 Sino-Indian skirmish, alongside the border of Himalayan kingdom of Sikkim
- 1987 Sino-Indian skirmish, at the Sumdorong Chu Valley
- 2013 Depsang standoff, at Ladakh
- 2017 China–India border standoff, at Doklam
- 2020 Sino-Indian skirmishes, at various points, incl. near Ladakh and Sikkim
- 2022 Yangtse clash, at Arunachal Pradesh

== See also ==
- Sino-Indian War (1962)
- Sino-Indian border dispute
- India-Pakistan border skirmishes (disambiguation)
- Indian War (disambiguation)
- Chinese Indian (disambiguation)
- Indo-Chinese (disambiguation)
