= 1971 war =

The 1971 war may refer to:

- Bangladesh Liberation War, 1971 civil war in Pakistan initiated by East Pakistan (now Bangladesh) separatists supported by India
  - India–Pakistan war of 1971, armed conflict in the later stages of the war

== See also ==
- India–Pakistan border skirmishes (disambiguation)
- List of wars: 1945–1989#1970–1979
