= Chinese Indian =

Chinese Indian or Indian Chinese may refer to:

- China–India relations
- Chinese community in India
- Indians in China
- Chinese in India
- Chindians, people of mixed Indian and Chinese descent
- Indian Chinese cuisine, adaptation of Chinese seasoning and cooking techniques to Indian tastes

== See also ==
- Indo-Chinese (disambiguation)
- Sino-Indian skirmish (disambiguation)
- Other South Asian communities in China:
  - Nepalis in China
  - Pakistanis in China
