= 2020–21 India–Pakistan border skirmishes =

Series of armed skirmishes between India and Pakistan in Kashmir

2020-2021 India–Pakistan border skirmishes
- Part of the Indo-Pakistani conflicts and the Kashmir conflict
- Map of the disputed region of Jammu and Kashmir
Date	November 2020 – 25 February 2021 (3 months, 1 week and 5 days)
Location	Line of Control, Kashmir
Result	Ceasefire: Status quo ante bellum

Belligerents
India	Pakistan

Units involved
Indian Army; Border Security Force	Pakistan Army; Pakistan Rangers

Casualties and losses
Per India: 9 servicemen killed; 6 civilians killed	Per Pakistan: 7 servicemen killed; 28 civilians killed; Per India: 13 servicemen killed

The 2020–2021 India–Pakistan border skirmishes were a series of armed clashes between India and Pakistan along the Line of Control in the disputed region of Kashmir, which is subject to extensive territorial claims by both countries. The standoff intensified when a major exchange of gunfire and shelling erupted between Indian and Pakistani troops in November 2020 along the Line of Control which left at least 22 dead, including 11 civilians.

== Casualties ==
According to Indian Army sources, 11 Pakistani soldiers were killed in clashes, while 16 soldiers were injured. Six Indian civilians, four soldiers and one border guard were killed per the Indian Defence Ministry. Indian military released videos which showed mortars hitting and damaging Pakistani bunkers along the border.

Pakistani military sources said that five civilians and one soldier were killed in Pakistani-administered Kashmir amidst the clashes.

On 21 November, two Indian soldiers were killed in Rajouri. On 26 November, one Indian soldier was killed in Poonch and an additional two Indian military fatalities were reported in Rajouri on 27 November. On 15 December, two Pakistani soldiers were killed in the Bagsar region of Azad Kashmir according to Pakistan.

In November, Pakistan's foreign ministry said India had violated ceasefire at least 2,729 times in 2020 which resulted in the deaths of 21 Pakistani civilians and seriously injured 206 others, while the secretary of the State Disaster Management Authority Azad Jammu & Kashmir reported 28 civilians had been killed and 233 injured during the same period.

== Peace agreement ==
India and Pakistan released a joint statement, stating that after discussions, the two sides agreed to "strict observance" of all peace and ceasefire agreements with effect from midnight 25 February 2021. Both sides agreed existing forms of contact and border flag meetings would be utilized to resolve any future misunderstanding.

== See also ==
- India–Pakistan relations
- Line of Control
- India–Pakistan border
- Kashmir conflict
