= François Richier =

French diplomat (born 1963)

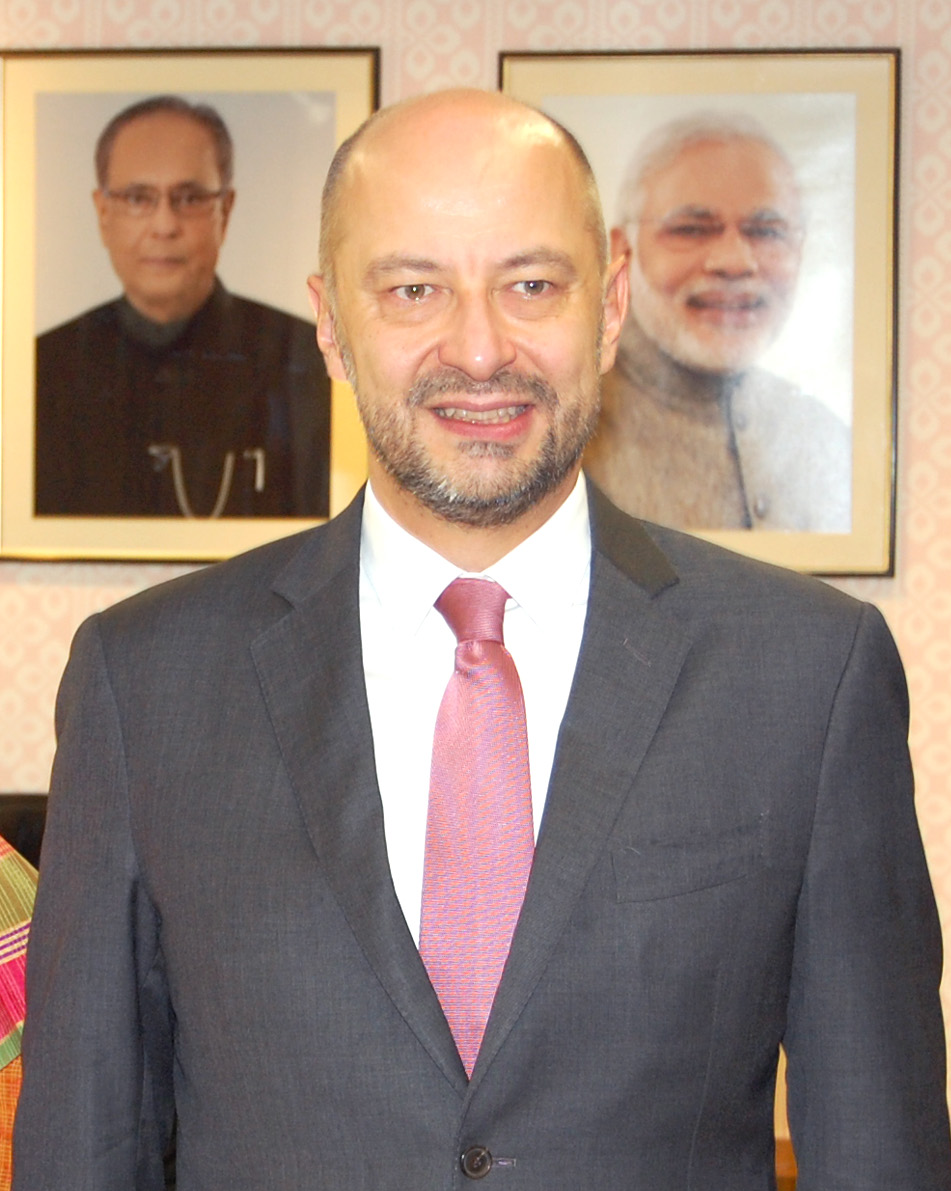
- François Richier, 2014

Personal details
- Born: 11 August 1963 (age 63) France
- Profession: Diplomat

François Richier (born 11 August 1963) is a former Ambassador Extraordinary and Plenipotentiary of Republic of France to India. He was previously the second counsellor at the Embassy of France in Berlin, from 1999 to 2000.

Richier was later the French ambassador to Afghanistan.
