= Kanachak =

Village in Jammu and Kashmir, India

Kanachak is a village in Marh Tehsil, Jammu district, Jammu and Kashmir, India. It lies along the international border (IB) with Pakistan. Kana Chak is nearby village to Jhiri where every year North India's biggest kisaan mela is held in the memory of saint cum farmer Baba Jitto in the month of November. The area is popularly known as Kanachak Jhiri. International Border is close to Kana Chak. Mini buses are available from Jammu City to Kana Chak. Kana Chak village is popularly known for Jhiri Mela held annually in the month of November in the great memory of Baba Jitto. Lalyal, Kalyanpur, Jhiri, Panjore, Shama Chak, Chanu Chak are nearby villages to Kana Chak.
