= 2016 Indian Line of Control strike =

Part of the continuing Indo–Pakistani conflict in Kashmir

2016 Indian Line of Control Surgical Strike
- Part of Indo-Pakistani conflicts, Kashmir conflict and India–Pakistan border skirmishes (2016–2018)
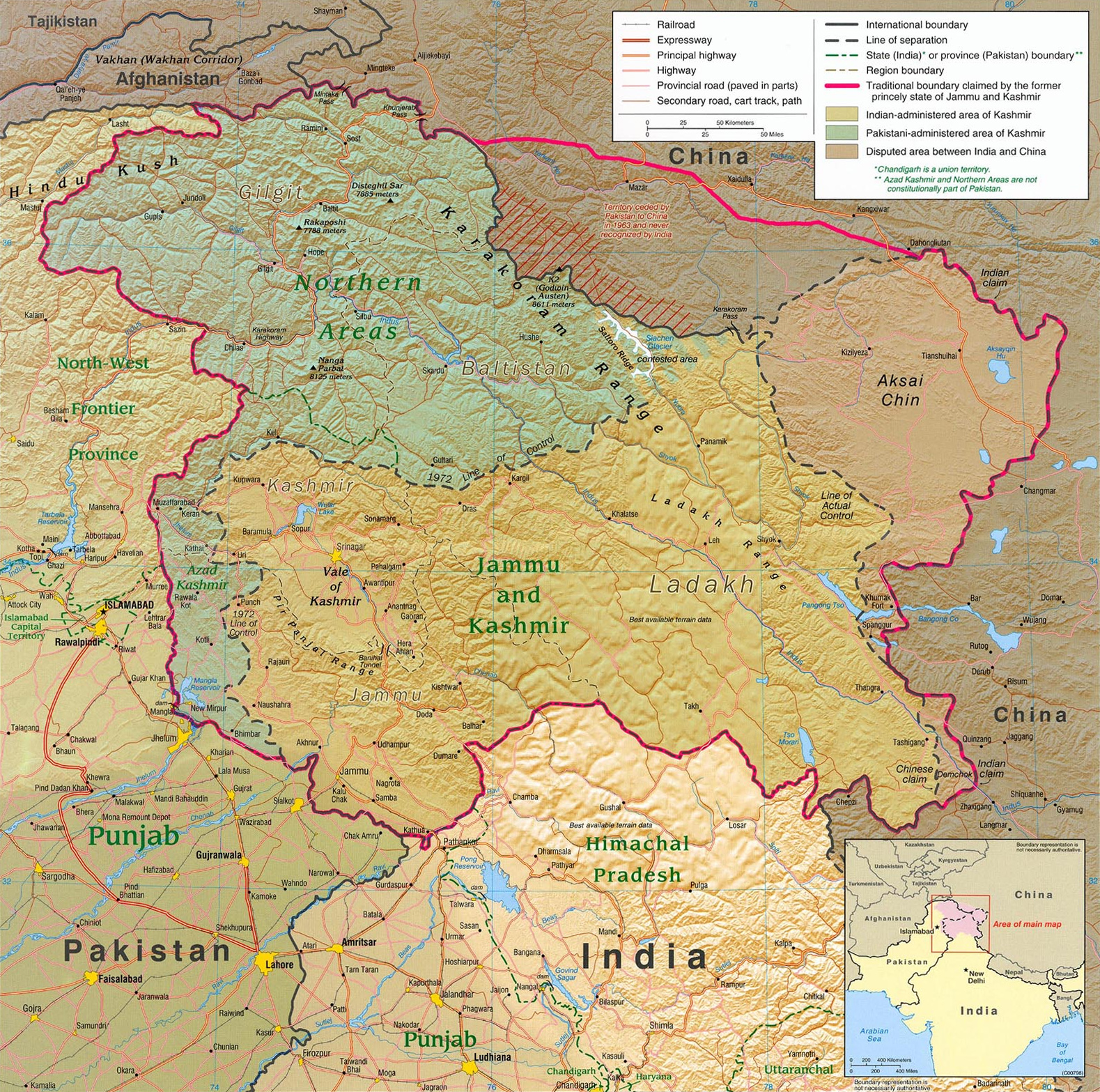
- The Map of Line of Control
Date	28–29 September 2016 (1 day)
Location	Line of Control
Result	Indian cross-border strike; Start of 2016–18 India–Pakistan border skirmishes

Belligerents
India: Indian Army	LeT (Indian claim); JeM (Indian claim); HuM (Indian claim)	Pakistan: Pakistan Army

Commanders and leaders
Pranab Mukherjee _{(President of India)} Narendra Modi _{(Prime Minister of India)} Gen. Dalbir Singh Suhag (Chief of Army Staff); Lt.Gen. Ranbir Singh (Director-General of Military Operations); Lt.Gen. Deependra Singh Hooda (GOC-in-C, Northern Command); Manohar Parrikar _{(Minister of Defence)}	Unknown	Mamnoon Hussain _{(President of Pakistan)} Nawaz Shareef _{(Prime Minister of Pakistan)} Gen. Raheel Sharif (Chief of Army Staff); Lt.Gen. Malik Zafar Iqbal (X Corps Commander); Khawaja Muhammad Asif (Minister of Defence)

Units involved
Northern Command; Parachute Regiment: 4 and 9 Para (Special Forces)	Unknown	X Corps

Casualties and losses
Per India: 1–2 servicemen wounded; Per Pakistan: 8 servicemen killed; 1 serviceman captured	Per India: 35–40 militants killed; Per Pakistan: None Killed	Per India: 9 servicemen killed; Per Pakistan: 2 servicemen killed; 9 servicemen wounded

On 29 September 2016, teams of Indian Army Para (Special Forces) crossed the Line of Control into Pakistani-administered Kashmir to attack targets up to a kilometer within territory held by Pakistan. The raid occurred ten days after four militants had attacked an Indian army outpost at Uri on 18 September 2016 in the Indian state of Jammu and Kashmir, and killed 19 soldiers. Estimates of casualties among the militants and Pakistan army, from India's cross-border attack varied, with figures of 35 to 40 being reported. The Pakistani government eventually acknowledged the deaths of two soldiers and injuries to nine, while one Indian soldier was captured.

The Indian Government termed the attack a surgical strike against "militant launch pads" in Pakistani territory. Pakistan rejected India's claim, and instead initially claimed that Indian troops did not cross the Line of Control and had only skirmished with Pakistani troops at the border, although it subsequently admitted to having captured an Indian soldier. Pakistani security sources claimed that at least eight Indian soldiers were killed in the exchange, and one was captured. India confirmed that one of its soldiers was in Pakistani custody, but denied that it was linked to the incident or that any of its soldiers had been killed. Pakistan said India was hiding its casualties.

Independent analysts pointed out that the Indian government's casualty figures were considerably exaggerated, with the true number being a dozen or fewer. They also criticised the usage of the term "surgical strike", pointing to the fact that no use of air transport was made, and the incursions did not penetrate deep into Pakistani territory. Analysts wrote that the term "surgical strike" was used to portray the incident in a positive and nationalist light to the Indian public. The Indian news media uncritically reported the Indian government's version of events, often discouraging skepticism of the "surgical strike": television coverage was militant and nationalist in nature.

Media outlets noted that the details regarding the attack remained unclear. India's announcement on 29 September marked the first time that the government had publicly acknowledged its forces crossing the Line of Control. In the succeeding days and months, India and Pakistan continued to exchange fires along the border in Kashmir, resulting in dozens of military and civilian casualties on both sides.

== Background ==
On 18 September 2016, a fedayeen attack was made by four armed militants on an army base near the town of Uri. Nineteen Indian Army soldiers were killed. India accused Jaish-e-Muhammad, a Pakistan-based terrorist organisation. Having come after similar fidayeen attacks in Gurdaspur and Pathankot, the Uri attack gave rise to high degree of concern in India. The following day, the Indian army said that it had displayed considerable restraint in the wake of the attacks, but it reserved the right to respond "at the time and place of our own choosing".

The Guardian said that Indian patience had run out due to Pakistan's inaction in curbing the activities of terrorist organisations such as Lashkar-e-Taiba and Jaish-e-Mohammad. On 21 September, India summoned the Pakistan High Commission Abdul Bassit and gave a protest letter detailing the involvement of a terrorist group based in Pakistan. Pakistan later said that India had provided no evidence that the Uri attack was launched from Pakistan. Pakistan's defence minister suggested that India had carried out the Uri attack to deflect attention from the popular protests in Jammu and Kashmir. The Hindustan Times reported that the minister's comments made up an "inflection point", after which India decided to respond militarily.

Indian officials said that the cross-border infiltration across the Line of Control had surged since the unrest began in Kashmir. The persons crossing the border showed evidence of military training. According to a government source close to Home Minister Rajnath Singh, a meeting of the Cabinet Committee on Security was held on 24 September, at which "broad details of targeting terrorists" were discussed.

== Surgical strikes ==
On 29 September, eleven days after the Uri attack, the Indian Army conducted surgical strikes against suspected militants in Pakistani-administered Kashmir. Lt Gen Ranbir Singh, Indian Director General of Military Operations (DGMO), said that it had received "very credible and specific information" about "terrorist teams" who were preparing to "carry out infiltration and conduct terrorist strikes inside Jammu and Kashmir and in various metros in other states". The Indian action was meant to pre-empt their infiltration. India presented its operation as preemptive self-defence against terrorism, striking against terrorist infrastructure along with "those who are trying to support them." Columnist Ankit Panda thought the latter included Pakistani soldiers or the elements of Pakistani state. On 30 September, Indian minister for information and broadcasting Rajyavardhan Singh Rathore said that there had been no aerial strikes and that the operation had been conducted "on the ground".

Ranbir Singh said that his Pakistani counterpart had been informed. The Pakistani military said the DGMO communications discussed only the cross-border firing, which was part of the existing rules of engagement.

Pakistan denied that such surgical strikes occurred. The Inter-Services Public Relations said that there had been only "cross border firing". Pakistan Prime Minister Nawaz Sharif condemned the "unprovoked and naked aggression of Indian forces", and said that Pakistani military was capable of thwarting any attacks by India.

UN Secretary-General Ban Ki-moon said that the UN Observer Group in Pakistani Kashmir did not directly observe any "firing across the Line of Control" relating to the incident. The Indian envoy at UN Syed Akbaruddin dismissed this statement, saying "facts on the ground do not change whether somebody acknowledges or not."

Analyst Sandeep Singh, writing in The Diplomat, said that the operation is better characterised as a cross-border raid because "surgical strikes" involve striking deep into the enemy territory and typically using air power. Shawn Snow writing in The Diplomat questioned whether India had the capacity to conduct a "surgical strike", noting that Pakistan has a very comprehensive and modern air defence system. A cross border raid, if it occurred 1 km into Pakistani administered territory, is routine on either side with over a dozen incidents having occurred both ways, and does not qualify as a "surgical strike" which by definition requires deep striking and air power as Sandeep Singh, cited earlier, attests to.

=== Indian version ===
Indian officials said the strike targeted areas close to the Line of Control (LoC), where it believes militants congregate for their final briefings before sneaking across the LoC. An Indian security source said the operation began with Indian forces firing artillery across the frontier to provide cover for three to four teams of 70–80 soldiers from the 4th and 9th battalions of the Para Special Forces to cross the LoC at several separate points shortly after midnight IST on 29 September (18:30 hours UTC, 28 Sep). Teams from 4 Para crossed the LoC in the Nowgam sector of Kupwara district, while teams from 9 Para simultaneously crossed the LoC in Poonch district. By 2 a.m. IST, according to army sources, the special forces teams had travelled 1–3 km on foot, and had begun destroying terrorist bases with hand-held grenades and 84 mm rocket launchers. The teams then swiftly returned to the Indian side of the Line of Control, suffering only one injury, a soldier wounded after tripping a land mine.

The Indian Army said the strike was a pre-emptive attack on militant bases, claiming that it had received intelligence that the militants were planning "terrorist strikes" against India. India said that, in destroying "terrorist infrastructure" it also attacked "those who are trying to support them", indicating it attacked Pakistani soldiers too. India later briefed opposition parties and foreign envoys, but did not disclose operational details.

Some Indian media claimed that the Indian army infiltrated 2–3 km into Pakistani territory, but the Indian Army did not say whether its troops crossed the border or had simply fired across it. India said that none of its soldiers were killed though two soldiers were injured. It also stated that one of its soldiers, from 37 Rashtriya Rifles, was captured by Pakistan after he "inadvertently crossed over to the Pakistan side", though not during the "surgical strikes".

Initially, Indian media claimed that the army used helicopters during the skirmish. On 30 September, an Indian minister denied that there were any helicopters used, stating the operation was conducted "on the ground".

In 2018, the Indian government released an alleged footage of the strikes.

=== Pakistani version ===
Pakistan rejected claims that any surgical strikes occurred. Pakistan's Foreign Office said the claim as "baseless" and said India was "deliberately" escalating conflict. The Pakistan Army claimed that there had only been "cross border firing". Pakistan warned that it would respond militarily should any surgical strike actually occur. The two soldiers killed were identified as Naik Imtiaz and Havildar Jumma Khan.

Pakistani security sources claimed that hours after the strike, eight Indian soldiers were killed in retaliatory firing across the LOC and one was captured, Chandu Babulal Chavan. A Pakistani news anchor claimed fourteen Indian troops were killed. It further stated that India was concealing its casualty figures from the cross-border firing. It was later reported that the captured India soldier had wandered across the border in a different sector of the Line of control, where no conflict was reported. He was later returned to India.

Defence analysts in Pakistan said it was not possible for Indian forces to breach the heavily armed and fenced LoC border undetected, perform operations at multiple sites over several hours, and return without casualties and military resistance. According to one source, the Indian narrative matched a "fantastic movie script" created for public consumption. Ejaz Awan dismissed Indian claims of paratrooper involvement, stating: "For pulling out these troops, you need helicopters on the ground."

== Media reports ==
Lieutenant general Ranbir Singh, the Indian Army DGMO, only stated during his press conference on 29 September that the number of casualties inflicted had been "significant". Most accounts in the Indian media varied as to the number of militants killed, with most publications giving estimates of 35 to 50 killed. On 9 October, the Indian army said that it had intercepted radio messages of the Pakistan army and claimed that "around 20" Lashkar-e-Taiba militants had been killed, including at least 10 during the surgical strikes and nine killed at Balnoi (opposite of Poonch).

On 1 October, the Pakistani army gave international media outlets including BBC, CNN, VOA, Reuters, AP, AFP and Newsweek a tour of the sites which India claimed to have hit on 29 September. The Pakistan army claimed that had there been a "surgical strike", there would have been more damage. The journalists confirmed that the "area seemed intact", but added that they only saw what the Pakistani army showed them. The Economist remarked that they were taken to the border "under strict supervision, naturally".

On 5 October, The Indian Express stated it had managed to conduct covert interviews with eyewitnesses living across the Line of Control (LoC). The Express claimed that eyewitnesses corroborated the Indian account by describing fire engagements with militants and the destruction of some makeshift buildings that housed militants; but that there was little damage to infrastructure. However, the Express said that according to eyewitness accounts, and classified documents, the number of militants killed was lower than the 38–50 number reported by Indian officials; there were reports that "five, perhaps six" bodies had been trucked out the morning after the raids from Dudhnial (4 km from the LoC), while three or four militants were killed near Khairati Bagh. The Express said that the militants, many of whom belonged to Lashkar-e-Taiba, were caught by surprise. Other accounts reported "fire and explosions" from the east bank of the Neelum River in Athmuqam.

On 5 October, India's CNN-News18 claimed that it conducted a "sting operation" where their news correspondent posing as an Inspector General of Police made a phone call to a Superintendent of Police (SP) Ghulam Akbar in Mirpur. In an audio conversation aired on the news channel, a voice claiming to be Akbar reveals details about the military action of 29 September including the places of strikes and the number of Pakistani casualties, quoted as 12 people including 5 military personnel. The voice says that the bodies were said to have been carried away in coffins and buried in the villages, and that an unknown number of militants ("jihadis") had also died. On 6 October, Pakistan's Foreign Office said that the voice in the audio conversation did not belong to Ghulam Akbar, and that Akbar had denied the alleged phone conversation. The ministry called the story a fabrication, and hoped that CNN International would take action against its Indian affiliate.

On 23 October, a BBC News article by M. Ilyas Khan quoted unnamed police officials and locals stating the Indians appeared to have crossed the LoC, in some cases by more than a kilometer, to attack Pakistani border posts. The article said the Indian Army had conducted a ground assault in the Pooch sector, destroying a Pakistani post and killing a soldier; setup their guns on a ridge in Leepa valley, hitting three posts and killing four Pakistani soldiers; and advanced in the Dudhnial sector injuring a Pakistani soldier, but were beaten back after their movements were detected. The report also took statements from villagers at Madarpur (Poonch District) and Leepa Valley (Bagh District) and Dudhnial (Neelam District) who confided that Indian troops directed heavy fire at several Pakistani border posts. The BBC News could not verify if any militants were hit. Villagers in Dudhnial said that they saw one or two damaged structures close to a Pakistani border post. The villagers in Leepa Valley said that, following the attack, there was an increased influx of militants to the valley.

The Economist wrote that by interviewing eyewitnesses and anonymous officials, journalists in both Pakistan and India have pieced together an account of what happened:

it appears that small teams of Indian commandos had slipped across the line to strike at safe houses believed to be used by Islamist guerrillas. The number killed was estimated at a dozen or fewer, rather than the 38–50 initially claimed by India. None of those killed were Pakistani army personnel. And since the Pakistani government has no wish to inflame domestic opinion and so be forced to escalate matters, it preferred to pretend that nothing had happened.

== Aftermath ==
Indian intelligence sources claimed that, immediately after the raid, the Pakistan military had buried the corpses of the slain terrorists to erase any evidence and to maintain Pakistan's version of a "skirmish" along the Line of Control. However, Pakistan rejected that any such casualties occurred, questioning: "Where did all the dead bodies go?" Pakistan's military also pointed to the lack of damage or losses in the site, and welcomed UN observers and journalists to conduct an independent inquiry. Increased firing along the Line of Control was reported the following day.

A senior Indian Home Ministry official subsequently claimed that in the wake of the raid, at least 12 training camps belonging to Lashkar-e-Taiba, Hizbul Mujahideen and Jaish-e-Mohammad had been swiftly moved from their locations at Pir Chanasi, Aksha Maskar and Tabuk near Muzaffarabad in Pakistan-administered Kashmir. Based on satellite images, inputs from foreign intelligence agencies and unnamed "sources in Pakistan", according to the official, the training camps had been relocated "near crowded towns deep inside Pakistan", in the provinces of Khyber Pakhtunkhwa and Punjab, to "minimise casualties to their assets." According to the Indian official, the camps had housed around 500 militants, 300 of whom belonged to Lashkar-e-Taiba alone.

An Indian newspaper, Indian Express, alleged that they had covertly interviewed five people across the LoC. One of the five eyewitness reported that on 30 September, a day after the surgical strikes, several members of Lashkar-e-Taiba had met for Friday prayers at a Lashkar-affiliated mosque in Chalhana. "The Lashkar men gathered there were blaming the Pak Army for failing to defend the border", he said, "and [were] saying they would soon give India an answer it would never forget." Several days after the raids, a leading Indian security official who had been closely involved in their planning said that Pakistan's continued denial that any surgical strikes took place was a "stance that suits us". He further stated – "The surprise element in such an operation is key to its success and there will be no predictable repetition. If provoked yet again, we will amend our operational tactics."

Both Indian Defence Minister Parrikar and National Security Advisor Doval were shown original, unedited footage from the military raids on 1 October. After viewing it, Parrikar informed Prime Minister Modi that he was satisfied with what he had seen, and that there was no need to publicly release any footage. In response to calls from members of opposition parties to release the footage, a senior government official stated, "The Opposition should understand the difference between a covert and overt strike. And it is not incumbent on the Indian Army to release video footage every time they do their duty." On 5 October, two senior ministers in the Indian government said the Indian Army had submitted the footage to the government, but that the government, with the concurrence of the army, felt there was no need to release it to the public.

After India's operation, India and Pakistan increased their exchanges of small arms and mortar fire across the Line of Control, resulting in frequent reports of Indian and Pakistani casualties.

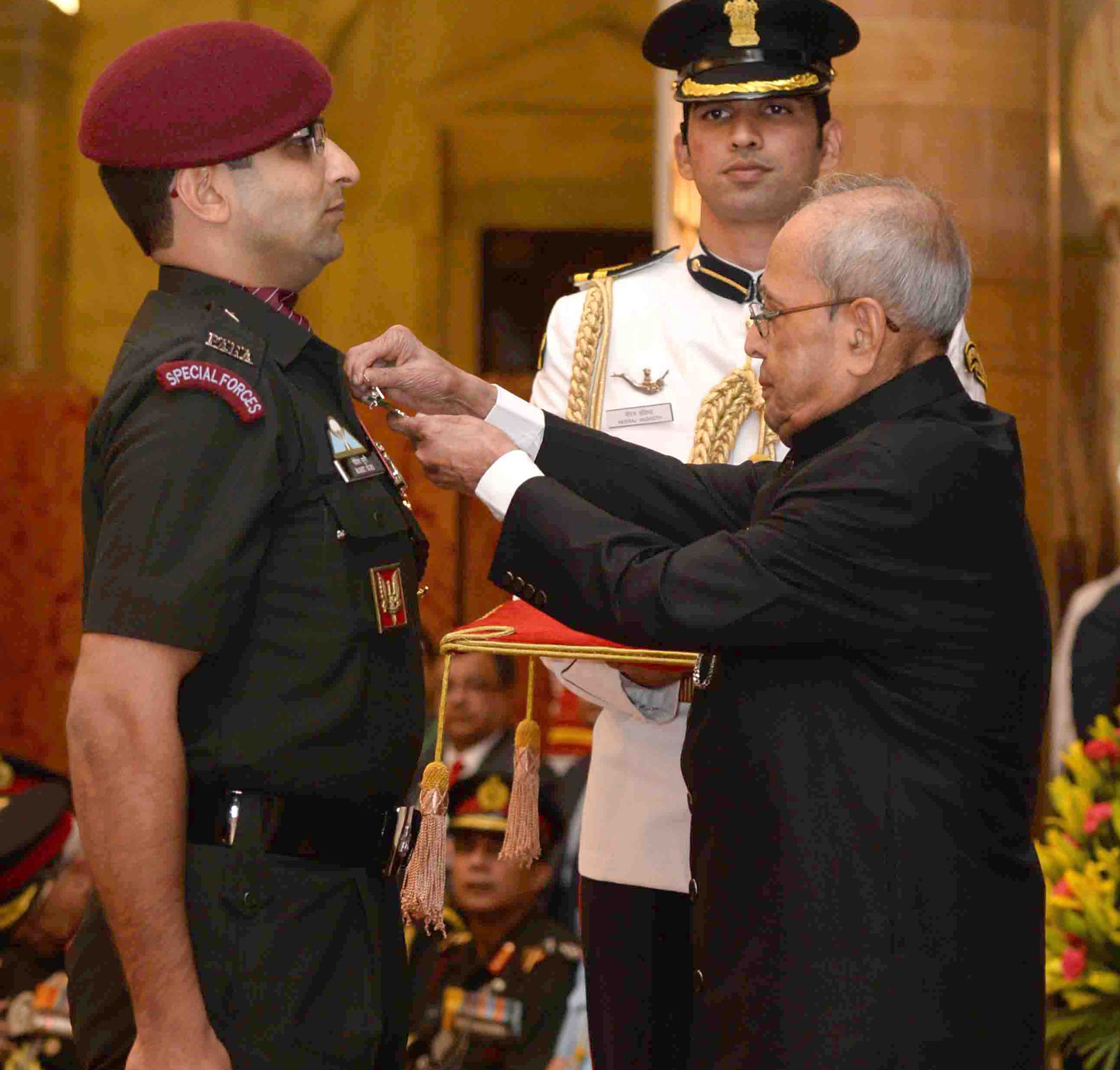
Kirti Chakra to Major Rohit Suri

In 2017 the Indian government conferred gallantry awards to nineteen soldiers who had participated in the strikes. Among those who received awards include Major Rohit Suri, the leader of the operation who was honored with the Kirti Chakra, the second highest peacetime gallantry award.

On 27 June 2018, an alleged footage of the strikes was released by the Indian government to the Indian media as proof to the strike. Pakistan's foreign office spokesman, however, rejected the alleged video and termed Indian claims as farcical. The Indian government released additional videos on 27 September 2018.

== Reactions ==
=== India ===
Across India, the military raid was widely praised. The opposition initially raised doubts that the surgical strike actually took place, but later the opposition leader Rahul Gandhi lauded Prime Minister Modi commenting- "for the first time in his tenure, he has taken an action that is worthy of the status of a Prime Minister."

Following the military raid, in anticipation of cross-border shelling from Pakistan, Indian authorities evacuated 10,000 residents of villages located within ten kilometres of the border, in the states of Punjab and Jammu and Kashmir. Military surveillance was also stepped up along the Line of Control.

=== Pakistan ===
Pakistan rejected the claim of a surgical strike, stating that Indian troops had only engaged in firing upon Pakistani soldiers, killing two Pakistani soldiers and wounding nine. The spokesperson for the Pakistani Army asked: "Where is the damage?", referring to the lack of any evidence of surgical strikes. ISPR spokesman Asim Bajwa termed the "surgical strike" claim an "illusion being deliberately generated by India to create false effects" and a "fabrication of the truth".

Pakistani Prime Minister Nawaz Sharif convened an all-parties conference and an emergency cabinet meeting. He stated Pakistan would take any steps necessary to safeguard its territorial integrity. "We will defend our homeland against any aggression. The entire nation is standing shoulder to shoulder with our armed forces."

Pakistan's Chief of Army Staff Raheel Sharif termed the Indian claim a "drama", adding that "If Pakistan were to conduct a surgical strike, it would become a chapter in Indian textbooks."

== International Reactions ==
=== Countries ===
- Islamic Republic of Afghanistan – Shaida Abdali, Afghanistan's ambassador to India, expressed support for the military raids by India, stating the actions in Pakistan-administered Kashmir had been conducted in "self-defence". He added his hopes that "no one will allow safe havens for terrorists to be used against neighbours."
- Bangladesh – Iqbal Chowdhury, the advisor to the Prime Minister of Bangladesh, stated India had the "legal, internationally accepted right" to take action. "Bangladesh always believes that any aggression or attack on the sovereignty of the independence and legal right of a country is not acceptable and Bangladesh always feels that any country must honour and respect the sovereignty of a third country."
- Bhutan – Bhutan have backed India on cross-border stand.
- China – Foreign Ministry spokesperson Geng Sheung stated that China, "as a shared neighbour and friend to both India and Pakistan," was concerned about the "continuous confrontation and tensions" between the two nations. He said China called on "all relevant parties to exercise restraint and refrain from actions that would escalate tension," and expressed hopes that both parties would address their differences through dialogue.
- Germany – Martin Ney, the German ambassador to India, expressed Germany's support for the military raids and that it stood beside India in its counter-terrorism efforts. Stating that under international law, every nation was obliged to ensure that terrorism did not emanate from its territory, he said there existed a clear international law "that any state has the right to defend its territory from any form of global terrorism."
- Russia – The Russian Ministry of Foreign Affairs expressed concern over "aggravation" of the situation along the Line of Control, and stated it expected Pakistan to take "effective" steps in stopping the activities of terrorist groups operating from its territory. "We are calling on the parties not to allow any escalation of tension and to settle the existing problems by political and diplomatic means through negotiations. We stand for decisive struggle against terrorism in all its manifestations." Russian Ambassador to India Alexander Kadakin subsequently said that the Russian Federation was the only country to directly state that terrorists came from Pakistan; he called upon Pakistan to end cross-border terrorism and welcomed India's surgical strikes. "[The] greatest human rights violations take place when terrorists attack military installations and attack peaceful civilians in India. We welcome the surgical strike. Every country has [the] right to defend itself."
- United States – White House spokesman Josh Earnest encouraged continued talks between India and Pakistan, to avoid further escalating the situation.

=== Organisations ===
- European Union – Vice President of the European Parliament Czarnecki said that it was necessary for India to maintain pressure on Pakistan for eliminating cross-border terrorism. He praised Indian army and Indian government for its professional approach to the situation.
- United Nations – Stéphane Dujarric, spokesperson for Secretary-General Ban Ki-moon, stated the Secretary-General was following the developments "with great concern", adding that the United Nations "calls on the governments of India and Pakistan to exercise restraint, and encourages them to continue the effort to resolve their differences peacefully and through dialogue." In a press conference on 3 October, Vitaly Churkin, the Permanent Representative of Russia to the United Nations and the President of the UN Security Council for that month, refused to comment on the India-Pakistan situation, stating the Security Council had not been discussing the matter.

== De-escalation ==
Adviser to the Prime Minister on Foreign Affairs was confirmed to be attending the 7th Heart of Asia Conference, the first visit by a high-level Pakistani official since December 2015. This was seen as a move to help de-escalate tensions by the Indian media. The situation de-escalated after 23 November, with no incident being reported except the injury of a BSF personnel in Pakistani firing on 2 December. Pakistan's High Commissioner to India Abdul Basit also offered hosting bilateral dialogue at Heart of Asia Conference. But the conference ended without any peace talks and the delegates returned to their countries. Media said that there was a short conversation between Aziz and Indian leaders as soon as he landed. But it was denied this was not billed a de-escalation of border tensions.

== Published accounts ==
=== Books ===
- Aroor, Shiv; Singh, Rahul (20 September 2017). India's Most Fearless: True Stories of Modern Military Heroes. Penguin Random House India Private Limited. ISBN 9789386815422.
- Securing India The Modi Way: Pathankot, Surgical Strikes and More (2017) is a book written by Nitin Gokhale, a South Asian strategic analyst and senior journalist. The book dwells into details about the planning and execution of the operation among other things.
- Zafar Nawaz Jaspal, India's 'Surgical Strike' Stratagem: Brinkmanship and Response (Khursheed Printers (Pvt.) Ltd., 2019). The book was written by Jaspal, a Professor of Pakistan's premier university, QAU gives a Pakistani perspective on the surgical strike. ISBN 978-969-23370-0-7

=== Documentaries ===
Special Operations: India 'Surgical Strikes' (2018) is a TV documentary which premièred on 22 January 2018 on History TV18 Channel. It was directed and produced by Prabhu Asgaonkar and Manika Berry Asgaonkar.

=== Film ===
Uri: The Surgical Strike (2019) is an Indian Hindi-language film based on the attack and was released on 11 January 2019, starring Vicky Kaushal and Yami Gautam as lead roles.

=== Web series ===
Avrodh the Siege Within (2020) is an Indian web series, nine episodes long, based on the 2016 Uri attack and the following surgical strikes. It is based on a chapter of the book India's Most Fearless.

== See also ==
- 2019 Indian Line of Control strike
- Indo-Pakistani wars and conflicts
- List of cross LOC military operations
- India–Pakistan relations
