= 2011 India–Pakistan border skirmish =

- Part of the Indo-Pakistani wars and conflicts
Date	30 July 2011 – 30 August 2011
Location	Line of Control (LOC)
Result	Ceasefire

Belligerents
India	Pakistan

Commanders and leaders
(India) Vijay Kumar Singh	(Pakistan) Ashfaq Parvez Kayani

Units involved
Indian Army; Border Security Force	Pakistani Army; Pakistan Rangers

Casualties and losses
July, 2011; 6 killed (per India); August, 2011; 1 killed (per India)	July, 2011; None; August, 2011; 3 killed (per Pakistan); 13 killed (per India)

The 2011 India–Pakistan border skirmish was a series of incidents which took place during the months of July and August 2011 across the Line of Control in Kupwara district and Neelam Valley. Both countries gave different accounts of the incident, each accusing the other of initiating the hostilities.

== Kupwara attack ==
India sources claimed that Pakistani Border Action Team (BAT) attacked a remote Indian Army post located at Gugaldhar Ridge, Kupwara district on 30 July 2011. The post was defended by soldiers of the 19 Rajput Regiment and 20 Kumaon Regiment, the latter in the process of replacing the former. Around six Indian soldiers were killed in the attack. During the attack, the Pakistani forces beheaded two soldiers of the 20 Kumaon and took back the heads with them. A soldier of the 19 Rajput succumbed to his injuries in the hospital. A few days later, Indian army also discovered a video clip of the severed heads from a Pakistani militant who was killed while crossing into Jammu and Kashmir.

== Operation Ginger ==
In retaliation, Operation Ginger was planned by the Indian Army which a plan to conduct an ambush on the Pakistan Army post of Police Chowki using multiple teams. Seven, physical and aerial reconnaissance missions were conducted and three Pakistan Army posts were identified as vulnerable. These posts included Police Chowki, a post at Jor, and the Hifazat and Lashdat lodging point. Indian commandos crossed over the Line of Control (LoC) at 10 pm on 29 August and reached their targets at 3 am on 30 August, a day before Eid. The first team of commandos laid claymore mines preparing for an ambush and targeting four Pakistani soldiers, including a junior commissioned officer (JCO), at 7 am. One of the Pakistani soldiers was injured and fell into a stream while the other three soldiers were beheaded by the Indian commandos. Indian soldiers then booby trapped the dead bodies with IEDs. Two Pakistani soldiers from the post rushed towards the ambush site after hearing the explosions but were killed by a second team of Indian soldiers. Two other Pakistani soldiers attacked the second team but were killed by a third team of Indian soldiers. At 7:45 am, the Indian soldiers started to head back to the LoC. As they were retreating, they saw another group of Pakistani soldiers heading towards the ambush site. They heard loud explosions which indicated that the IEDs had been triggered and estimated that two to three additional Pakistani soldiers had been killed in the blast. The last team reached back on the Indian side by 2:30 pm on 30 August. During exfiltration, an Indian soldier blew his finger off when he accidentally fell on a mine. Six Pakistani soldiers were beheaded. The Indian team carried two heads across the border to Pak and carried back with them three severed heads, their insignias, three AK-47 rifles, and other weapons as trophies. Initially the heads were photographed and buried. Later on, However, the heads were burned on the orders of a senior general in the Indian Army, so no DNA evidence would be left behind. The ashes were then disposed of, so no DNA evidence would be left behind. India claimed that during the 45 minute operation, at least eight Pakistani soldiers were killed and a further two to three Pakistani soldiers may have been fatally injured.

Officially, an Indian Army spokesman maintained that the incident started when Pakistan made an infiltration bid in the Keran Sector of Kupwara district, Jammu and Kashmir on 30 August, which was foiled by Indian security forces. During this incursion, an Indian Army JCO was also killed. He further claimed that there were two unprovoked firing incidents by the Pakistani Army, one on 31 August at around 8 pm and another on 1 September at around 11 am.

== See also ==
- 2013 India–Pakistan border skirmishes
- 2014 India–Pakistan border skirmishes
