= Arnia =

- Town
- Arnia in Jammu and Kashmir, India Arnia (India)
- Coordinates: 32.52°N 74.8°E
- Country: India
- State: Jammu and Kashmir
- District: Jammu
- Elevation: 269 m (883 ft)

Population (2001)
  - Total: 45,890

Languages
  - Spoken: Dogri, Punjabi, Hindi
- Time zone: UTC+5:30 (IST)

Arnia is a town and a notified area committee in Jammu district in the union territory of Jammu and Kashmir, India.

== Geography ==
Arnia is located at 32.52°N 74.8°E. It has an average elevation of 269 metres (882 feet).

== Demographics ==
As of 2001 India census, Arnia had a population of 9057. Males constitute 52% of the population and females 48%. Arnia has an average literacy rate of 65%, higher than the national average of 59.5%; with 57% of the males and 43% of females literate. 12% of the population is under 6 years of age.

== Religion ==
Hindu 98.64%, Sikh 0.55%, and Christian 0.47%.

== Border conflicts ==
In recent years, Arnia has been subject to ceasefire violations by Pakistan which has led to the killing of civilians and the destruction of villagers' properties.
