= Suhail Muhammad Hamoud =

Free Syrian Army rebel

- سهيل محمد حمود
- Born: 1989 (age 36–37)
- Military career
- Allegiance: Ba'athist Syria (2007–2011); Syrian opposition (2011–2016, 2020–present)
- Branch: Syrian Army (until 2011) (Syrian opposition) Free Syrian Army (2011–2016, 2020–present)
- Service years: 2007–2011; 2011–present
- Nickname: Abu TOW
- Units: Hazzm Movement; 101st Infantry Division; 1st Coastal Division; 13th Division; Sham Legion
- Conflicts: Syrian Civil War; Idlib Governorate clashes (June 2012–April 2013); Battle of Aleppo (2012–2016); al-Nusra Front–SRF/Hazzm Movement conflict; 2015 Idlib offensive; Northwestern Syria offensive (April–June 2015); Northwestern Syria offensive (October–November 2015); Northwestern Syria offensive (December 2019–March 2020)

Suhail Mohammed Hamoud (Arabic: سهيل محمد حمود, romanized: Suhayl Muḥammad Hammūd), popularly known by his nom de guerre Abu TOW (Arabic: أبو تاو, romanized: ʾAbū Tāw), is a Syrian rebel fighter and former military officer who rose to prominence for his skill in operating the BGM-71 TOW anti-tank missile during the Syrian civil war. He had 140 confirmed hits as of 2021.

== Military career and role as a rebel fighter ==
Prior to the Syrian Civil War, Suhail served in the Syrian Army as a warrant officer. He received training on the usage of Russian-made anti-tank guided missiles from the Field Artillery School in Aleppo. He defected to the Free Syrian Army in 2011, participating in the battles in Idlib Governorate and the countryside south of Aleppo.

In a 2016 interview with al-Monitor, he said, "I was trained in the Syrian army to use the Russian Malyutka and Red Arrow anti-armor missiles, which are not so different from the TOW missiles but do not enjoy the same precision, so I gained experience in dealing with all anti-armor missiles both in terms of structure and trajectory and regardless of their points of strength or weakness." Elaborating on his success with anti-tank missiles, he said, "I destroyed around 70 targets, of which 57 machineries were destroyed through TOW missiles and 11 machineries through the Malyutka missiles. These targets included planes, tanks, armored vehicles and armored personnel carriers in addition to DShK machine guns."

Before joining the Sham Legion, he was a fighter in the Hazzm Movement and later the 101st Infantry Division, the 1st Coastal Division and 13th Division. All of these groups received support from the United States, including the provision of BGM-71 TOW anti-tank missiles.

While a member of the Hazzm Movement, he fought battles against Al-Qaeda's Syrian affiliate Al-Nusra Front between 2014 and 2015.

"From the beginning, Suhail was known for his hatred of Nusra Front," according to his friend Ahmad Barakat, interviewed by The Daily Beast. He was protected from being kidnapped by Nusra, because of his popularity and his great effect on the battlefield ... Regime troops used to get scared when they heard Abu TOW was participating in a battle; this was something we would hear on the wireless handhelds." According to Barakat, Abu TOW had been the subject of several assassination attempts by the Al-Nusra Front.

Around April or May 2017, Suhail uploaded pictures of himself smoking in front of a Tahrir al-Sham sign which stated "Smoking is haram". He uploaded another picture of him with duct tape in front of an HTS sign saying "No to a truce because it is sedition". While driving in the village of Ihsim, he was arrested by HTS. When he went to the HTS police in the village of Marayan the following day, he was accused of "derision of religion." He was arrested by the HTS security branch and taken to a prison. An attempt by a delegation of Hamoud's Sham Legion fighters to negotiate his release was unsuccessful. Hammoud's relative was told that he would appear before an HTS judge.

Leaders of several Free Syrian Army-affiliated groups have privately petitioned HTS to release Hammoud. On 13 May 2017, it was reported that he was released from custody.

On 10 February 2020, Hammoud returned to Idlib Governorate to participate in military operations against Syrian government forces for the first time since his release.

On 18 March 2020, Hammoud was the target of a kidnapping attempt in the city of Idlib. He was shot in the foot, but the assailants were engaged by people accompanying him. HTS was blamed for the attack, but has denied this. After being hospitalized, Hammoud left Idlib governorate for northern Aleppo.

On 25 February 2022, Hammoud expressed his urge to travel to Ukraine and fight with the Ukrainian Army against the Russian army during their invasion of the country.

On 22 March 2023, Hammoud posted a photo on Twitter of him and a TOW missile launcher with a caption: "Wherever Russia goes, I will be at my job". Rumors appeared that Hammoud might be fighting in Ukraine after the tweet, however there is no evidence of this.

On 27 December 2024, Hammoud replied on Twitter to a post by Volodymyr Zelenskyy asking "How can I go to Ukraine and fight with you against Russian forces?"
