= Juzif =

Juzif جوزف
- Town
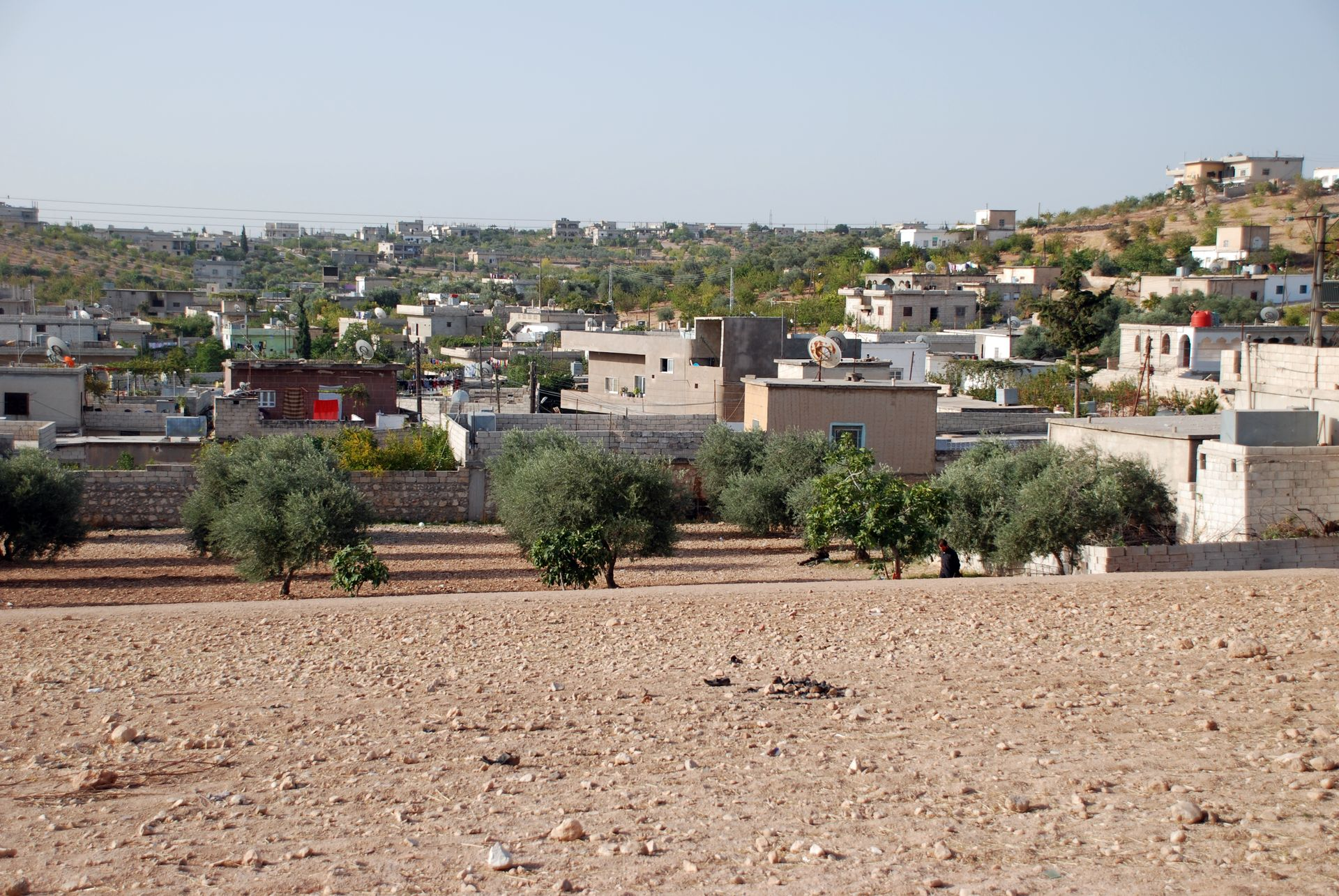
- Skyline of Juzif, 2009

- Location in Syria
- Coordinates: 35°43′6″N 36°28′27″E
- Country: Syria
- Governorate: Idlib
- District: Ariha
- Subdistrict: Ihsim

Population (2004)
  - Total: 3,029
- Time zone: UTC+2 (EET)
  - Summer (DST): UTC+3 (EEST)

Juzif (Arabic: جوزف) is a village in northwestern Syria, administratively part of the Ihsim Subdistrict of the Ariha District in Idlib Governorate. It is situated in the northwestern part of the Jabal Zawiya mountain, just east of the al-Ghab Plain. According to the Syria Central Bureau of Statistics, Juzif had a population of 3,029 in the 2004 census.
