= BGM-71 TOW =

American anti-tank missile

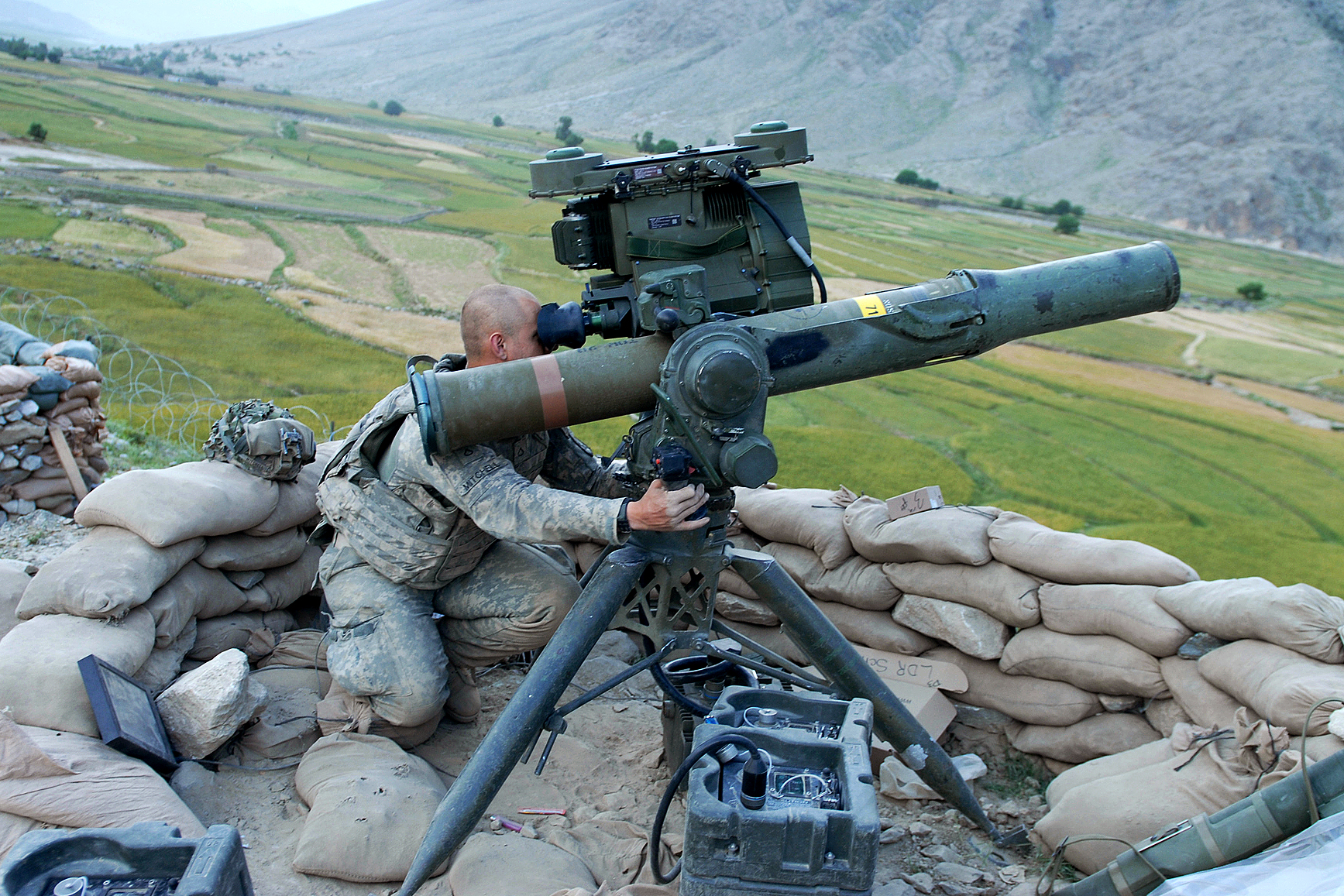
- An M41 tripod-mounted TOW ITAS-FTL with PADS of the U.S. Army in Kunar Province, Afghanistan, May 2009
- Type: Anti-tank missile
- Place of origin: United States

Service history
- In service: 1970–present
- Used by: See Operators
- Wars: Vietnam War; Western Sahara War; Third Indochina War; Lebanese Civil War; 1982 Lebanon War; Soviet–Afghan War; Iran–Iraq War; Persian Gulf War; War in Somalia; Iraq War; Syrian civil war; War in Iraq (2013–2017); Russo-Ukrainian War; Russian invasion of Ukraine; Yemeni Civil War; Saudi Arabian-led intervention in Yemen; 2016 India-Pakistan Border skirmishes; Conflict in Najran, Jizan and Asir; 2025 Cambodia‒Thailand conflict

Production history
- Designer: Hughes Aircraft Company
- Designed: 1963–1968
- Unit cost: $93,640 (2B Aero), $54,956 (Bunker Buster) FY2021 £8,500 (1984)
- No. built: > 700,000

Specifications
- Length: 1.16–1.17 m with probe folded 1.41–1.51 m with probe extended (some variants have no probe)
- Diameter: 152 mm
- Wingspan: 0.46 m
- Warhead weight: 3.9–6.14 kg (penetration 430–900 mm RHA)
- Operational range: Basic TOW 3,000 m, most variants 3,750 m
- Maximum speed: 278–320 m/s
- Guidance system: Optically tracked, wire-guided (Wireless radio-guided in RF variants)

The BGM-71 TOW ("Tube-launched, Optically tracked, Wire-guided", pronounced /ˈtoʊ/) is an American anti-tank missile. First produced in 1968, TOW is one of the most widely used anti-tank guided missiles. It can be found in a wide variety of manually carried and vehicle-mounted forms, as well as in widespread use on helicopters. Originally designed by Hughes Aircraft in the 1960s, the weapon is currently produced by RTX.

TOW was designed to address the shortcomings of previous missiles like the SS.10 and ENTAC. In particular, there was a desire to improve the guidance system to make it easier to use, and greatly increase effective range. Earlier designs generally used a small joystick to directly control the missile's flight while the operator attempted to get it to line up with the target, a concept now known as MACLOS. In practice, users tended to overcorrect and fly the missile back and forth across the target. TOW used a new system that simply required the operator to keep a gunsight aligned on the target, and the electronics would calculate the control inputs needed, a concept today known as SACLOS. It did this by looking for a bright infrared lamp on the back of the missile and comparing that to the line-of-sight of the gunsight. The sights could also be equipped with infrared cameras or image intensifiers for night-time use, and it had roughly double the range of the earlier designs.

TOW was rapidly deployed on a wide range of man portable and light vehicles like jeeps and a variety of dedicated light armoured vehicles like the M901. The need for the missile to be visible in the sights for the guidance system to work meant that it was initially not suitable for launch from helicopters, as these might be firing at targets to one side or the other while the missile would be held facing forward. This led to the introduction of a new sighting system that could calculate the angle between the sights and the tube and quickly steer it into the sights. This became one of the TOW's most widely used applications, and was the primary armament of many Cold War era attack helicopters among many western forces.

TOW was among the most widely used weapons of its class from the 1960s into the 1980s when a number of new systems began to replace it in certain roles. For helicopter use, the laser guided AGM-114 Hellfire began to replace TOW in the 1980s, and more recently, smaller missiles like FGM-148 Javelin using top-attack profiles have largely replaced TOW in the man-portable roles. TOW remains widely used in vehicle mounts, but in US use the CCMS-H is planned to replace it in these roles.

== History ==
=== Previous designs ===
Late in World War II, the German Army began experimenting with modified versions of the Ruhrstahl X-4 wire-guided missile. Originally developed for the Luftwaffe as an anti-bomber weapon, by changing the warhead to one using a high-explosive anti-tank (HEAT) design, the new X-7 version made an effective anti-armor weapon with a range of hundreds of meters. This would greatly improve the effectiveness of infantry anti-tank operations, which at that time were generally based on smaller weapons like the Panzerfaust and Panzerschreck, limited in the best case to ranges on the order of 150 metres (490 ft). X-7 was never fully developed before the war ended.

In the immediate post-war era, the design was picked up by development teams in France and Australia. In France, Nord Aviation's Jean Bastien-Thiry developed an updated version of the X-7 using a solid fuel rocket as the very small and highly portable SS.10. Development started in 1948, with the first rounds fired in 1952. Evaluations by the US Army in 1953 concluded it was not ready for operation, but that its progress should be tracked. The Army then instructed the Redstone Arsenal to develop its own version of the basic concept, which emerged as the SSM-A-23 Dart, a larger design with roughly twice the range of the SS.10. While the development of the Dart continued, Nord delivered a workable version of the SS.10, as well as the extended-range SS.11. In the summer of 1958, the development of the Dart was canceled in favor of purchasing the two French designs.

During the same period, the British Army joined the Australian efforts to build a heavyweight long-range weapon, the Malkara, with a range of about 4,000 yards (3,700 m). The tracking system, similar to the SS.11, proved difficult to use and a new project started under the codename Orange William to address this. This system used a computer to calculate the impact point, sending commands to the missile using an infrared link. But the link was found not to work in smoke or dust, making it largely useless on the battlefield, and the project was abandoned.

=== New concept ===
In January 1958, the Army's Office of Ordnance Research and Development formed the Ad Hoc Working Group at the Ballistic Research Laboratories (BRL) to define a future replacement for the SS.10 and 11. The team included members from Picatinny Arsenal, Frankford Arsenal, Redstone Arsenal, Watervliet Arsenal, Detroit Arsenal and Harry Diamond Laboratories. The group almost immediately decided not to attempt to define a weapon concept, and instead spend the next two years studying the problem while researching the possibility of using alternative guidance systems and continually watching foreign developments where the US was lagging.

Meanwhile, aware of the British Army's dissatisfaction with the Malkara, Vickers started a private design of a smaller weapon similar to SS.10 but with a greatly improved guidance system. The resulting Vickers Vigilant was far easier to use in the field and required much less training. The Army, meanwhile, had come up with their own design that combined a system like the Vigilant with a much larger missile to produce Swingfire. The goal was to allow the launcher to remain completely undercover while a gunner took a portable sight forward to aim at the targets from a concealed location.

It was at some point during these early stages that the British became aware of the US developments. Having approved Swingfire to some degree based on the possibility of foreign sales, the emergence of a possible US competitor was a concern. Meetings between Solly Zuckerman and John H. Rubel led to the July 1961 Rubel-Zuckerman agreement, wherein the UK would continue development of the long-range Swingfire while the US concentrated on shorter-range missiles, up to 1,000 metres (3,300 ft), with new guidance systems. The US agreed to not introduce a system that competed directly with Swingfire or Vigilant without prior consultation but was free to develop new unguided "assault weapons" to replace the LAW. Both the US and Canadian Army agreed to purchase Swingfire for the long-range role.

=== HAW ===
Despite the efforts to reach an agreement over anti-tank missiles, in the early summer of 1961, the Chief of Ordnance asked BRL to deliver a formal definition for what was then known as the "Heavy Assault Weapon for the Long Range period", or HAW for short. (Note: Lister speculates the name was chosen deliberately to make it fall under the assault weapon grouping and thus bypass the Rubel-Zuckerman agreement.) They asked for a weapon to be delivered sometime between 1965 and 1970. BRL assigned the work to the Armored Systems Evaluation Branch of the Weapon Systems Laboratory. David Hardison, the Branch Chief, reconvened the Ad Hoc panel to review a long list of twenty-seven design proposals, all of which were found lacking.

Hardison then began preparing a list of the ideal characteristics of a HAW weapon. Of primary importance was the adoption of some form of semi-automatic guidance, as the manual guidance systems (MCLOS) of earlier weapons like SS.11 were found to be difficult to use as the relative movements of the launcher and target increased; MCLOS worked well for stationary launchers and slow-moving targets but had proven much more difficult to use from moving vehicles, and especially helicopters.

Experience with the MGM-51 Shillelagh missile demonstrated that the simplest solution to successfully tracking the missile was to optically track a flare attached to the missile using an infrared seeker. This was essentially identical to a heat seeking missile, but tracking its own missile rather than a separate target. Flares, however, were not ideal illumination sources, especially in the case where multiple rounds might be fired and the optical system might track the wrong one. In place of the flare, the panel selected an infrared (IR) lamp whose output would be modulated with a shutter so each missile would have a unique signal.

Using this style of guidance demanded that the missile be brought into the line-of-sight of the tracking system as soon as possible; in Shillelagh this was almost immediate because the missile was launched from a gun barrel directly into the view of the tracker. Earlier manual weapons like SS.10 and ENTAC flew upwards after launch to clear the ground when being launched by infantry lying on the ground, and thus would not be immediately visible along the line-of-sight. To ensure the HAW could be tracked successfully, it would have to be launched from a tube, like Shillelagh, but one that was lightweight to ensure mobility.

Finally, Shillelagh sent guidance commands to the missile using an infrared link, but as the British had discovered, this proved relatively unreliable in the field and was subject to countermeasures like random flashing IR lamps. For the shorter ranges envisioned for HAW, wire guidance was perfectly suitable and both much less expensive and largely immune to countermeasures.

=== TOW emerges ===
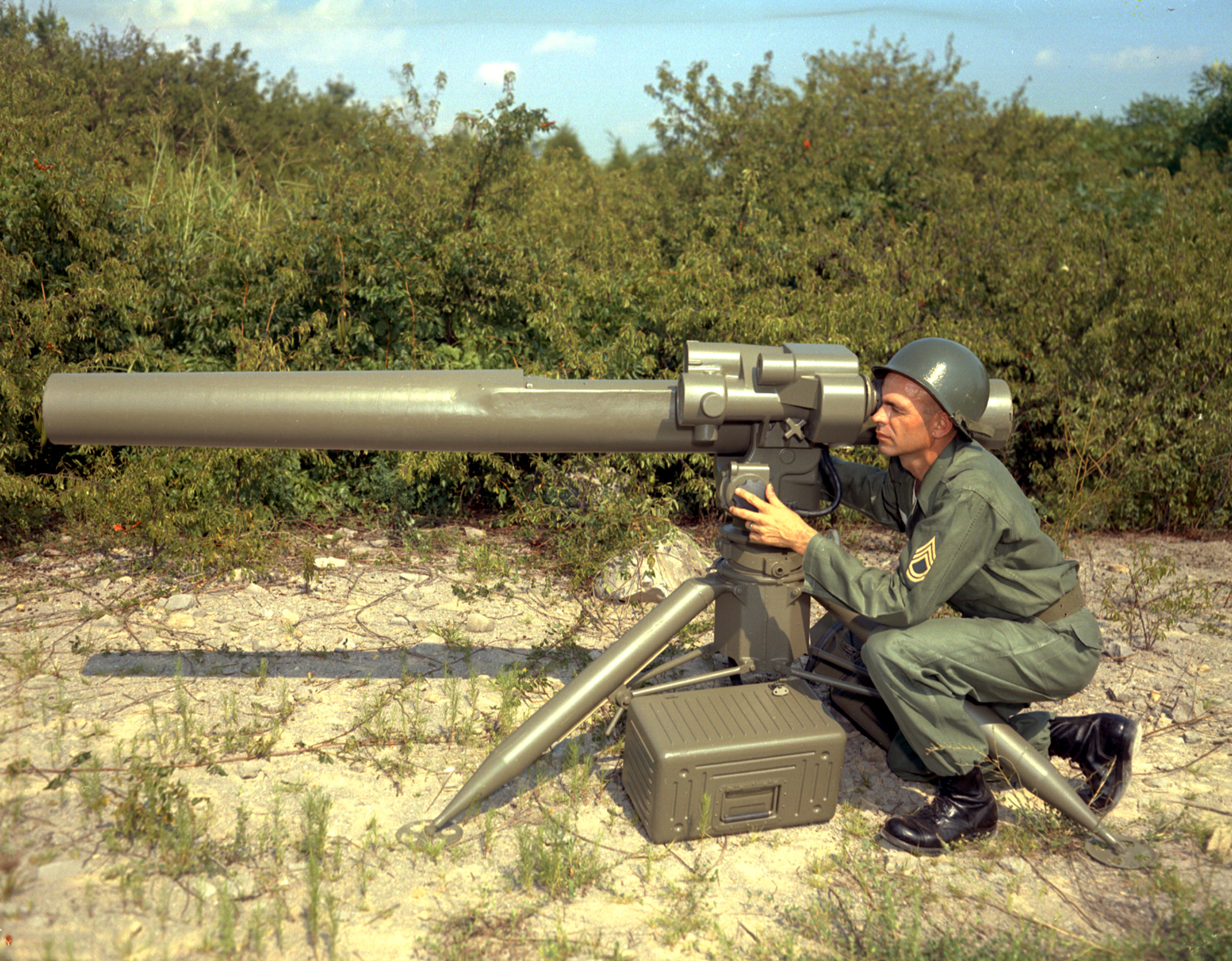
A U.S. Army soldier in 1964, with the first concept mock-up of Redstone Arsenal's proposed future HAW system (Heavy Antitank Weapon). The HAW ultimately resulted in the modern-day TOW.

The resulting design was tube-launched, optically tracked, and wire-guided. BRL programmer Harry Reed immediately christened it "TOW", a name that the system carried into production.

One problem that was noted early on was that the tube launch would make it difficult for the missile to be launched from a helicopter unless it was pointed relatively directly toward the target. Earlier systems were manually guided and did not need to be "gathered" quickly, so these were easier to launch at high crossing angles. Seeing this might be a major problem in the short term, TOW simply dropped the helicopter-launch requirement.

When the BRL team returned the HAW/TOW study, the Pentagon gave them six months to come up with an actual requirement instead of a list of desirable features. Reed gathered submissions from the industry and quickly selected three contractors for further details, Hughes Aircraft, Martin Marietta, and McDonnell Douglas. All three companies concluded the concept was able to be produced.

On 12 January 1962, the BRL officially assigned the development of the TOW concept to the U.S. Army Missile Command (MICOM), who in turn formed the Antitank/Aircraft Weapons Commodity Office on 19 November 1962. In December 1962, Hughes was instructed to continue development while a development contract was being drawn up. Budget approval for development was granted in January 1963 as the XM65 TOW, and the final development contract, the first 100 percent cost-plus-incentive-fee, was signed on 3 May 1963. This led to the TOW Project Office opening on 1 October 1964.

The British learned of the TOW program when it was sent to MICOM. In May, the US suggested they abandon Swingfire in favor of TOW, pointing out that the French were also introducing a long-range missile, and with three similar weapons in the marketplace, the British would find foreign sales difficult. However, the British Army was convinced that the launch vehicle would only survive if it was completely undercover, and TOW required the launcher to remain in sight of the target through the entire flight of the missile. They continued the development of Swingfire.

In 1969, the House Authorization Subcommittee considered ending the TOW program in favor of the Shillelagh. A series of presentations by both missile teams followed, and ultimately the decision was made to continue both programs in September 1970.

=== Designs ===
Three designs were returned for the initial selection, from Hughes, McDonnell, and Martin. Hughes' design used pop-out fins and a gyroscope to allow it to automatically maintain an "up" direction. The wire spools were licensed from Bofors and the rocket motor was made by Hercules. Guidance would be via flare tracking, using an internally-designed IR sensor based on their AIM-4 Falcon efforts.

McDonnell's entry did not attempt to control the spin of the missile, deliberately allowing it to spin during launch and flight like an artillery shell to improve accuracy. Like the Hughes entry, a gyroscope was used to define the up direction; in this case, this constantly changed relative to the missile body as it spun. The IR detector was placed at the end of a vertical V-shaped channel in the launcher. As gravity pulled the missile downward, it would begin to be blocked by the lower side of the V, causing the system to send commands to pull the missile upward. When it reached the top of the view at the end of the V, it stopped the up commands. The result was that the missile bounced up and down 2 feet (0.61 m) every 400 metres (1,300 ft) of flight.

Finally, Martin's missile used two side-mounted swept-back wings and a rocket that was split into two outlet tubes that were angled downward to give the missile natural lift during flight.

=== Hughes wins ===
The initial production contract was awarded to Hughes on 28 June 1968, and the final contract on 29 November 1968. On 10 June 1969, Chrysler's Huntsville Division was awarded the second-source contract.

Many problems emerged with the initial design, notably the early versions of the rocket motors which sometimes ejected burning bits of fuel, presenting a hazard to the gunners. MICOM suggested a new motor using "head end suspended double base" fuel from the M72 LAW which solved this problem. The IR source had problems due to its use of a fine metal filament that ignited the arc lamp which often broke during firing. Repeated tests and modifications solved this. The launch tube was designed to be sealed at both ends, with the rear seal being blown off by the rocket motor and the front by pressurized gas released by the guidance system's gyroscope. In practice, both proved unreliable, but remedial action solved the problems.

Production began at USAF Plant #44 and the first production examples were delivered in August 1969. In September 1970 three training battalions had formed, and by 30 September 1970, the TOW had replaced the Army's existing heavy anti-tank weapon, the M40 recoilless rifle. It increasingly replaced the French ENTAC missiles purchased earlier.

=== Helicopter launch ===
In December 1963 the issue of helicopter launches was once again considered. The problem with the existing semi-automatic systems was that the missile had to be "gathered" by the optical tracker quickly for it to send commands to the missile. In contrast, earlier all-manual systems could be guided by the gunner at any time. With the TOW being launched from a tube, some other system would be needed to ensure it could be guided into the optics field of view after launch. This would be all the more difficult if the helicopter was not flying directly at the target, or was maneuvering.

MICOM sent contracts to both Hughes and Philco Ford, makers of the Shillelagh, to develop stabilized launch sights for their respective missile designs. They were in the form of a complete system combining the sighting system, launcher tube assembly, and all related equipment as the XM26 weapon system. Hughes won the contest in 1965 and was awarded a second development contract for XM26 in June 1966.

XM26 was initially developed by a separate organization within BRL, the Aircraft Weapons Commodity Office. This was assigned to the TOW Project Office on 5 April 1970.

=== Replacement ===
The U.S. Army is seeking a replacement for the TOW through the Close Combat Missile System-Heavy (CCMS-H) effort. Objectives are for a weapon with increased range out to 10,000 m (6.2 mi) or more, as well as greater speed, the ability to fire on the move, and lock on before and after launch capability while retaining similar launcher size and arming distance. The Army hopes to field the CCMS-H sometime between 2028 and 2032.

== Design ==
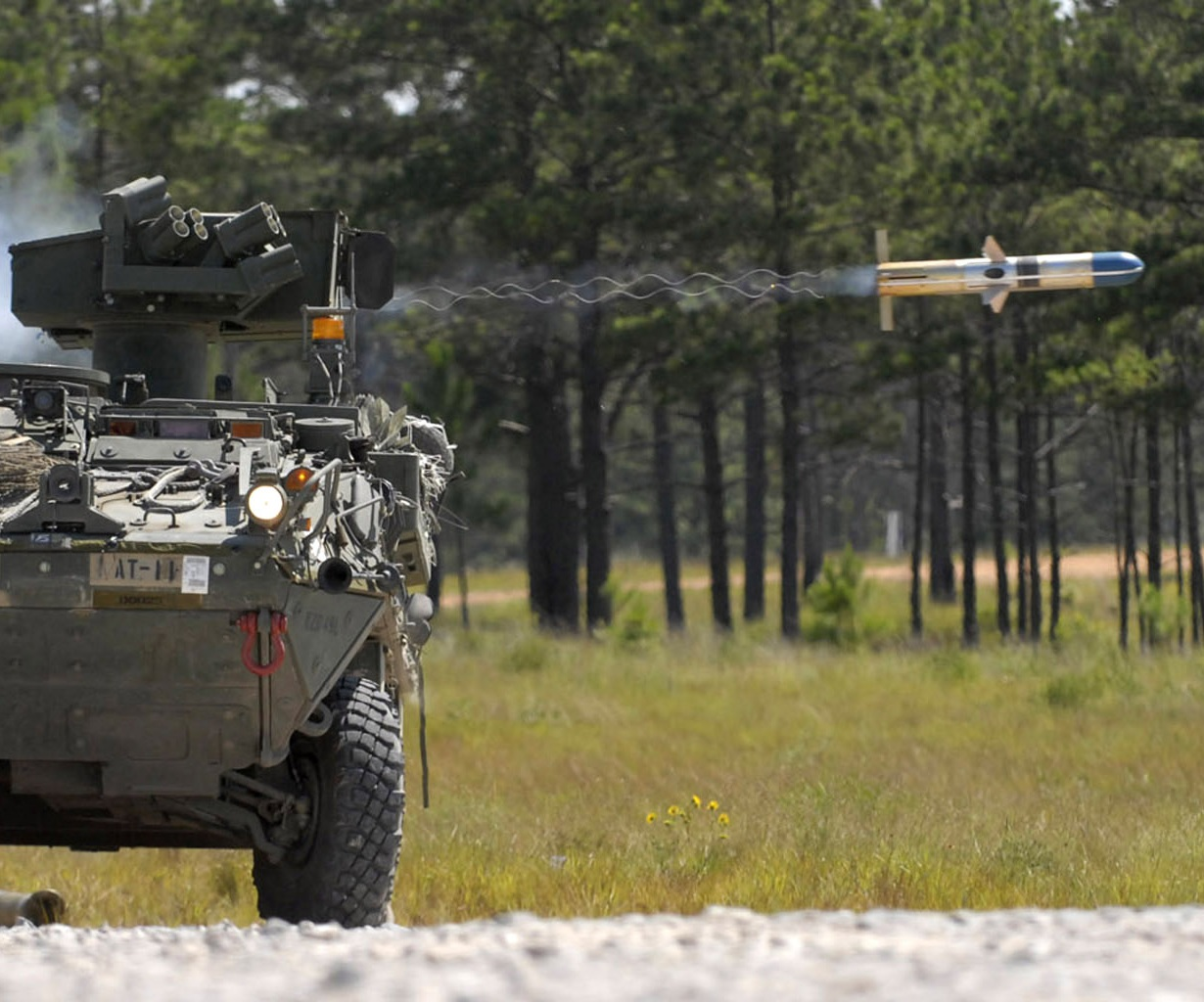
TOW launch showing guidance wires

In 1997, Raytheon purchased the missile systems division of Hughes Electronics from General Motors Corporation, so the development and production of TOW systems now come under the Raytheon brand. The weapon is used in anti-armor, anti-bunker, anti-fortification and anti-amphibious landing roles. TOW is in service with over 45 militaries and is integrated on over 15,000 ground, vehicle and helicopter platforms worldwide.

In its basic infantry form, the system breaks down into some modules: a folding tripod mount, a launch tube (into the rear of which encased missiles are inserted), a mandatory daylight tracker unit, which can be augmented with an optional AN/TAS-4 or AN/TAS-4/A gas-cooled night sight (or an all-in-one tracker unit on the M41 ITAS version), and a traversing unit, which mounts onto the tripod and carries the launch tube and sight, that also includes the weapon's trigger and the bridging clamp, which mates with the missile's umbilical data connector. In addition to this main assembly, there is a separate fire control system (FCS) module, which performs all guidance calculations, and a battery pack to power the system. These two modules link to each other, with the FCS then linked to the daylight tracker by a cable.

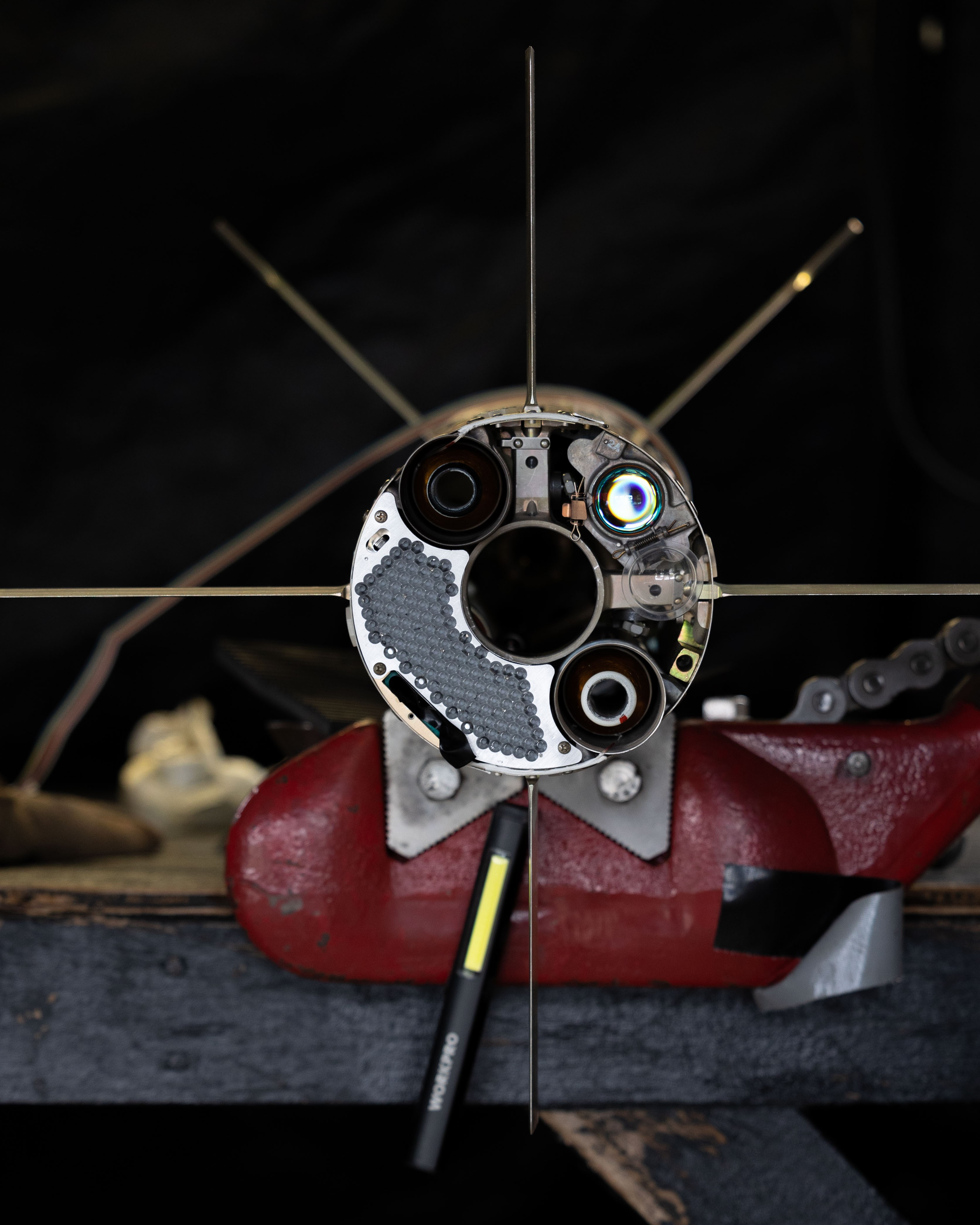
Rear end of a BGM-71F TOW missile, showing the IR beacon

When the target is sighted and the trigger is pulled, there is a 1.5-second firing delay while the missile spins up its internal gyroscope and the thermal battery reaches operating temperature. Once this concludes, the launch motor fires through the rear nozzle propelling the missile from the tube: this soft-launch motor fires for only 0.05 seconds and burns out before the missile has exited the tube. As the missile exits the launch tube, the first four wings just forward of the flight motor spring open forward, followed by four tail control surfaces, which flip open rearwards as the missile completely exits the launch tube. As the wings fully extend at about 7 meters from the launcher, the flight motor ignites, boosting the missile's speed to approximately 600 miles per hour (~1,000 kilometers per hour) during its burn time. At 0.18 seconds after launch, around 65 meters from the launcher, the warhead is armed by G-forces from acceleration by the flight motor, a safety feature intended to protect the operator if the flight motor fails to ignite. The flight motor burns out 1.6 seconds after launch, with the missile gliding for the remainder of its flight time. After the tracker captures the missile, IR sensors bore-sighted to the daylight tracker continuously monitor the position of an IR beacon on the missile's tail relative to the line-of-sight, with the FCS generating course corrections which are sent via the command link to the missile's integral flight control unit. The missile then corrects its flight path via the control surface actuators. The operator keeps the sight's crosshair centered over the target until impact: if the missile fails to strike a target, the command wires are automatically cut at 3,000 meters on the original TOW and 3,750 meters on most current-production TOWs. An automatic wire cut also occurs if the tracker fails to detect the missile's thermal beacon within 1.85 seconds of launching.

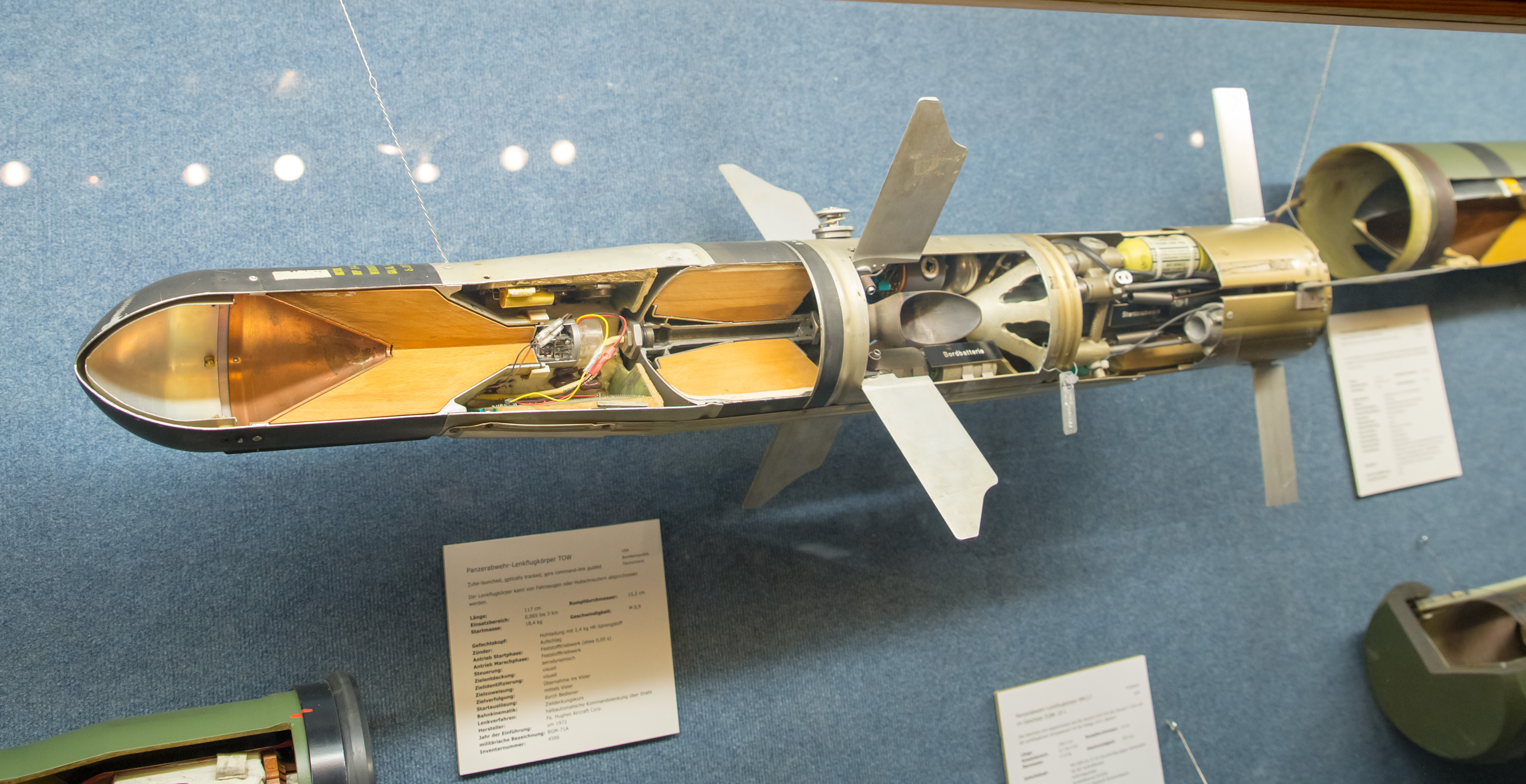
A TOW missile cutaway at a museum in Germany. The warhead is on the left, with its copper liner evident. Behind the warhead is the rocket motor with one exhaust nozzle visible. At the right is the guidance system and wire dispensers.

The TOW missile was continually upgraded, with an improved TOW missile (ITOW) appearing in 1978 that had a new warhead triggered by a long probe, which was extended after launch, that gave a stand-off distance of 15 in (380 mm) for improved armor penetration. The 1983 TOW 2 featured a larger 5.9 kg (13 lb) warhead with a 21.25 in (540 mm) extensible probe, improved resistance to jamming with a second, shorter wavelength xenon tracking beacon and optical encoders to randomly modulate the pulse frequency of both beacons and a motor that provided around 30% more thrust. This was followed by the TOW 2A/B, which appeared in 1987.

Hughes developed a TOW missile with a wireless data link in 1989, referred to as TOW-2N, but this weapon was not adopted for use by the U.S. military. Raytheon continued to develop improvements to the TOW line, but its FOTT (Follow-On To TOW) program was canceled in 1998, and its TOW-FF (TOW-Fire and Forget) program was cut short in 2002 because of funding limitations. In 2001 and 2002, Raytheon and the U.S. Army worked together on an extended range TOW-2B variant, initially referred to as TOW-2B (ER), but now called TOW-2B Aero, which has a special nose cap that increases range to 4.5 km. TOW-2B has top attack capability. Although this missile has been in production since 2004, no U.S. Army designation has yet been assigned. Wireless versions of the TOW-2A, TOW-2B, and TOW-2B Aero have been developed that use a "stealthy" one-way radio link, identified with the suffix "RF". These missiles require no special alterations to the launcher since the RF transmitter is encased along with the missile and uses the standard umbilical data connector.

In 1999, TOW received the Improved Target Acquisition System (ITAS).

An M41A7 ITAS launching the wireless-guided version of the TOW 2A practice missile (BGM-71E-3B-RF, with 'RF' standing for Radio-Frequency)

The TOW missile in its current variations is not a fire-and-forget weapon and like most second-generation wire-guided missiles has Semi-Automatic Command Line of Sight guidance. This means that the guidance system is directly linked to the platform, and requires that the target be kept in the shooter's line of sight until the missile impacts. A fire-and-forget TOW variant (TOW-FF) was under development but was canceled by the Army in 2002.

In October 2012, Raytheon received a contract to produce 6,676 TOW (wireless-guided) missiles for the U.S. military. Missiles that will be produced include the BGM-71E TOW 2A, the BGM-71F TOW 2B, the TOW 2B Aero, and the BGM-71H TOW Bunker Buster. By 2013, the U.S. Marine Corps had retired the air-launched TOW missile.

=== Launch platforms ===
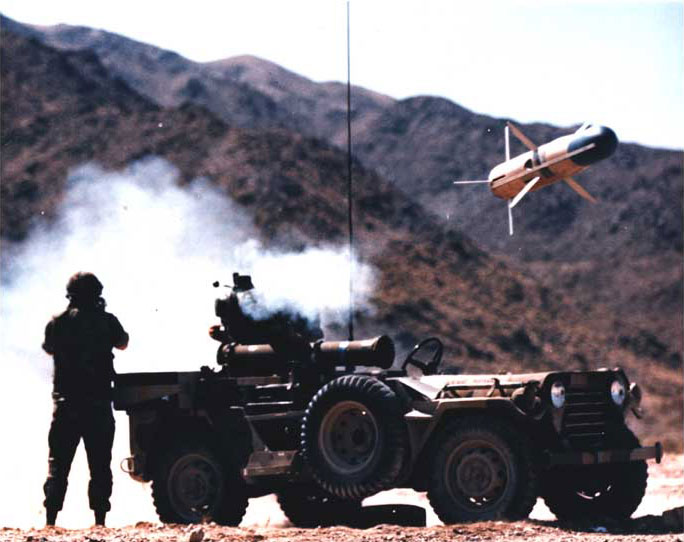
A TOW missile being fired from an M151

TOW is designated as a BGM by the U.S. military: a multiple launch environment (B) surface attack (G) guided missile (M). The B launch environment prefix is used only when the system can be essentially unmodified when launched from a variety of launch platforms.

The M151 and M220 launchers are used by infantry, but can also be mounted on some vehicles, including the M151 jeep, the M113 APC, the M966 HMMWV and the M1045 HMMWV (which replaced the M966). These launchers are theoretically man-portable but are quite bulky. The updated M151 launcher was upgraded to include thermal optics to allow nighttime usage and had been simplified to reduce weight. The M220 was specifically developed to handle the TOW-2 series.

TOW systems have also been developed for vehicle-specific applications on the M2/M3 Bradley IFV/CFV, the LAV-AT, the M1134 Stryker ATGM carrier, and the now-retired M901 ITV (improved TOW vehicle); they are generally referred to as TOW under armor (TUA).

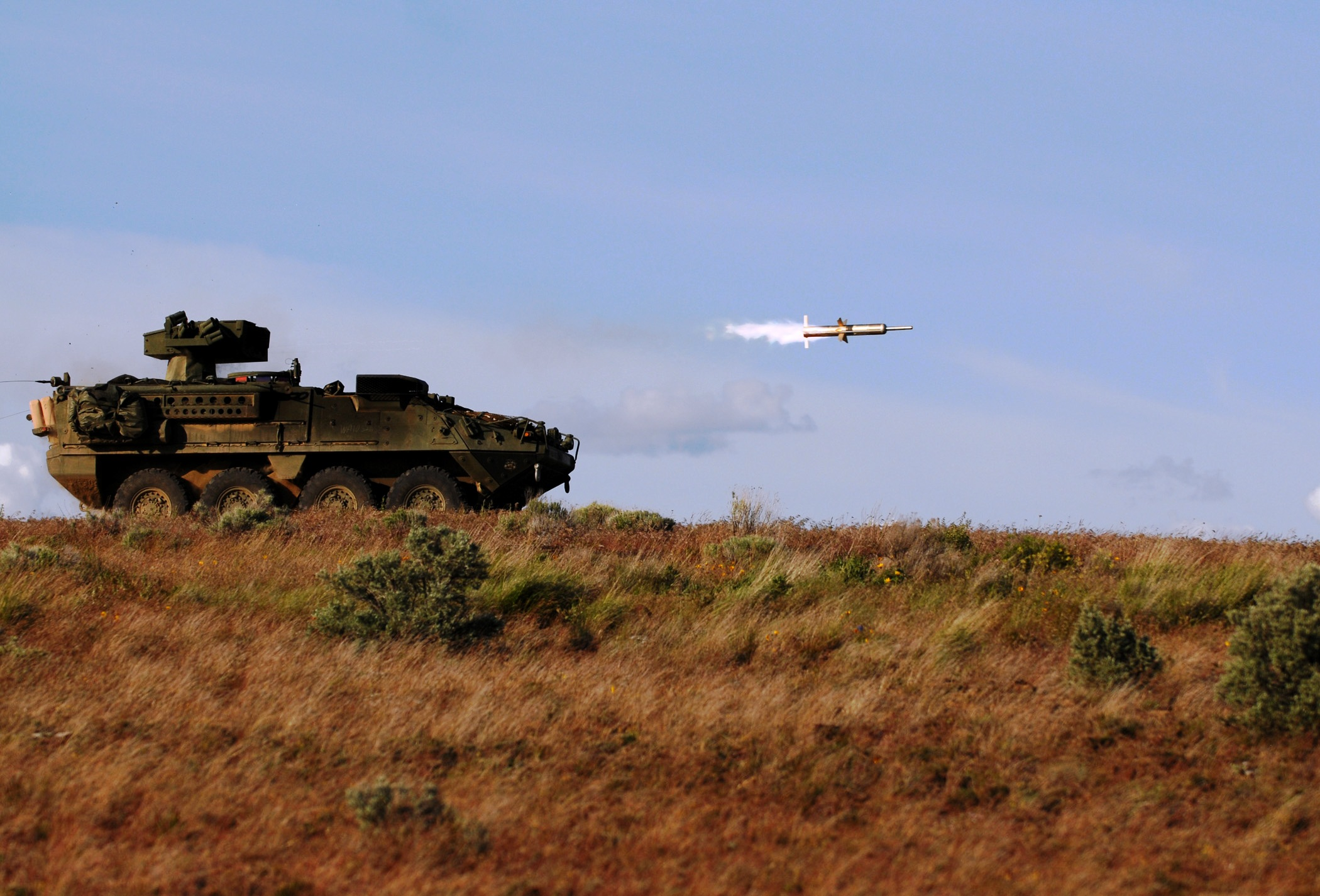
A U.S. Army M1134 Stryker ATGM carrier at the Yakima Training Center fires a TOW missile, May 2011

In helicopter applications, the M65 system used by the AH-1 series is the primary system deployed, but the XM26 system was developed for the UH-1, and a system was put into development for the later canceled AH-56 helicopter. TOW has also been used with AH.1 (TOW) and AH.7 variants of Westland Lynx helicopters, with the attachment of two pylons, each carrying four missiles.

The M41 TOW improved target acquisition system (ITAS) is a block upgrade to the M220 ground/high-mobility multipurpose wheeled vehicle (HMMWV)-mounted TOW 2 missile system. The TOW ITAS is currently being fielded to airborne, air assault, and light infantry forces throughout the active and reserve components of the U.S. Army and U.S. Marine Corps (where it is called the SABER). The ITAS, in addition to providing better anti-armor capabilities to antitank units, also has capabilities that make it an integral part of the combined arms team. Even when organized in heavy—light task forces, where the preponderance of antiarmor capabilities traditionally has resided in the heavy elements, TOW ITAS-equipped antitank units can not only destroy threat targets but also provide superior reconnaissance, surveillance, and target acquisition (RSTA), rear area protection, and urban operations capabilities.

M41A7 ITAS firing

The TOW ITAS consists of three new line replaceable units: the target acquisition subsystem (TAS), the fire control subsystem (FCS), and the lithium battery box (LBB); a modified TOW 2 traversing unit; the existing TOW launch tube and tripod; and a TOW Humvee modification kit. The TAS integrates into a single housing the direct view optics and missile tracker, a second-generation forward looking infrared (FLIR) night vision sight (NVS), and a laser rangefinder. TAS electronics provide automatic boresighting for these components, eliminating both tactical collimation and 180-day verification requirements. The integral cooling system for the IR optics is a modern SADA-II electrically powered cryocooler, removing the need to carry a supply of high-pressure coolant gas cartridges as was necessary for the previous AN/TAS-4 and AN/TAS-4A night sights.

The most recent addition to the ITAS system is the ITAS-FTL (far target location), which incorporates a new module called PADS (position attitude determination subsystem), a device that attaches to the top of the ITAS sighting unit and uses differential GPS tracking to relay precise coordinate data to the operator.

== Service history ==
In 1968, a contract for full-scale production was awarded to Hughes, and by 1970 the system was being fielded by the U.S. Army. When adopted, the BGM-71 series replaced the M40 106 mm recoilless rifle and the MGM-32 ENTAC missile system then in service. The missile also replaced the AGM-22B then in service as a heliborne anti-tank weapon.

=== 1972: Vietnam: first combat use ===
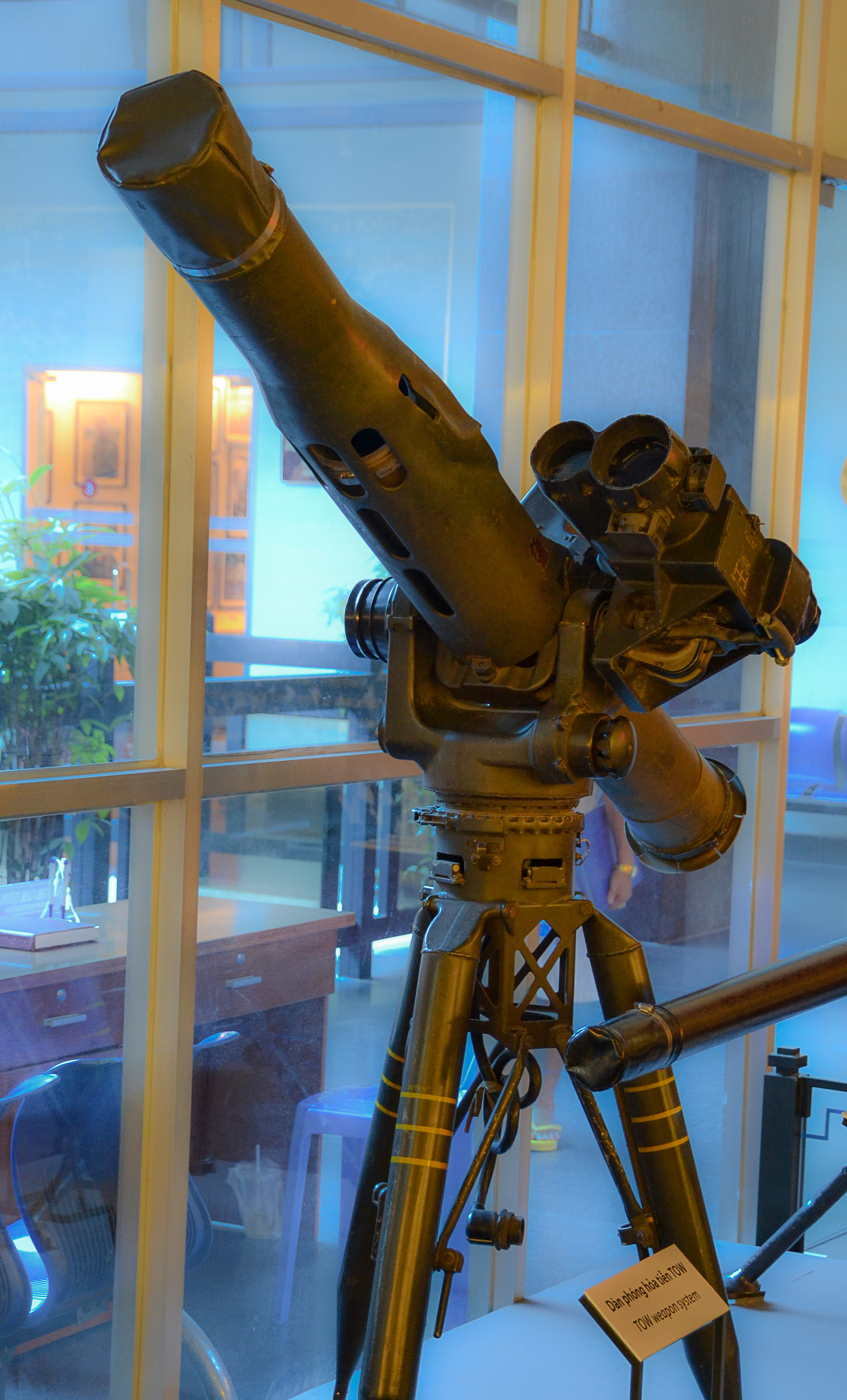
One of the captured TOW-launchers, exhibited in the War Remnants Museum in Ho Chi Minh City

On 24 April 1972, the U.S. 1st Combat Aerial TOW Team arrived in South Vietnam; the team's mission was to test the new anti-armor missile under combat conditions. The team consisted of three crews, technical representatives from Bell Helicopter and Hughes Aircraft, members of the United States Army Aviation and Missile Command, and two UH-1B helicopters; each mounting the XM26 TOW weapons system, which had been taken from storage. After displacing to the Central Highlands for aerial gunnery, the unit commenced daily searches for enemy armor. On 2 May 1972, U.S. Army UH-1 Huey helicopters firing TOWs destroyed North Vietnamese People's Army of Vietnam (PAVN) tanks near An Loc. This was heralded as the first time a U.S. unit neutralized enemy armor using American-designed and built guided missiles (in this case, against a captured American-made M41 operated by the PAVN). On 9 May, elements of the PAVN's 203rd Armored Regiment assaulted Ben Het Camp held by Army of the Republic of Vietnam (ARVN) Rangers. The Rangers destroyed the first three PT-76 amphibious light tanks of the 203rd, thereby breaking up the attack. During the battle for the city of Kontum, the TOW missile had proven to be a significant weapon in disrupting PAVN tank attacks within the region. By the end of May, BGM-71 TOW missiles had accumulated 24 confirmed kills of both PT-76 light and T-54 main battle tanks.

On 19 August, the ARVN 5th Infantry Regiment, 2nd Division abandoned Firebase Ross in the Que Son Valley, 30 miles (48 km) southwest of Da Nang, to the PAVN 711th Division. A dozen TOW missiles were left with abandoned equipment and fell into PAVN hands.

=== 1982: Lebanon War ===
The Israel Defense Forces used TOW missiles during the 1982 Lebanon War. On 11 June, Israeli anti-tank teams armed with TOW ambushed Syrian armored forces and destroyed many Syrian Soviet-made T-72 tanks. Estimates vary regarding the number of T-72s destroyed by TOWs (vs. the number destroyed by Merkava MBTs), with the lower end at nine and the high end attributing "the majority" of the 30 T-72s destroyed by Israeli forces in the war to Yossi Peled's anti-tank TOW units. This was probably the first encounter of the American anti-tank missile with the newer Soviet tank.

=== Iran–Iraq War ===
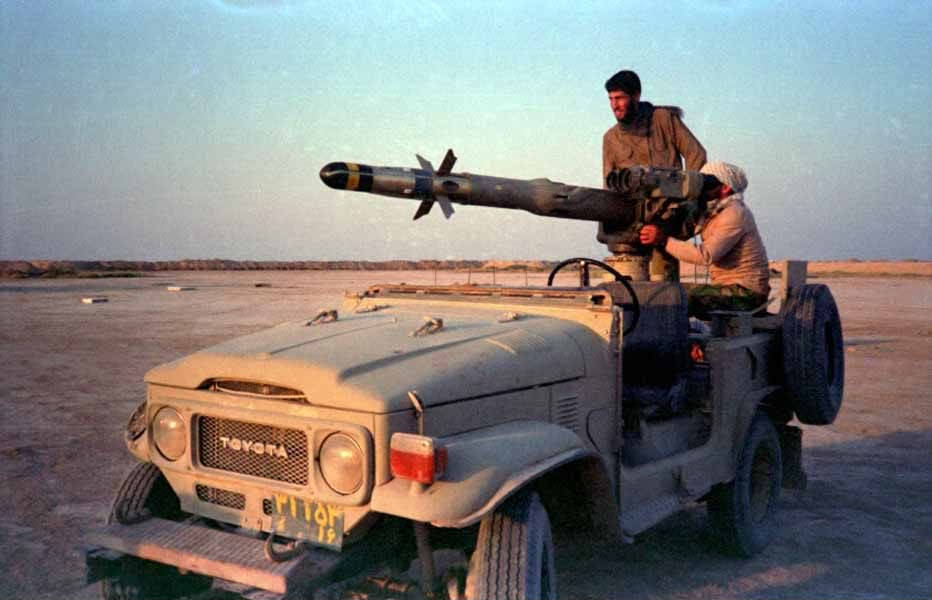
2 Iranian soldiers with a BGM-71 TOW mounted on a modified Toyota Land Cruiser technical during the Iran-Iraq war.

In the Iran–Iraq War of the 1980s, the Islamic Republic of Iran Army used TOW missiles purchased before the Iranian Revolution in 1979, as well as those purchased during the Iran–Contra affair.

Of the 202 AH-1J Internationals (export variant of the AH-1J SeaCobra) that Iran purchased from the US, 62 were TOW-capable. Iranian AH-1Js managed to slow down Iraqi tank advances into Iran. During the "dogfights" between Iranian SeaCobras and Iraqi Mil Mi-24s, Iranians achieved several "kills", usually using TOW missiles.

=== 1991: Persian Gulf War ===
TOW was used in multiple engagements during Operation Desert Storm in the Persian Gulf War of 1991. During the war, both the M2 Bradley Infantry fighting vehicle (IFV) and the M3 Bradley Cavalry Fighting Vehicle (CFV) carried TOW missiles. The M2 can also carry seven additional rounds, while the M3 can carry twelve. The M2 and M3 medium-weight Bradley Fighting Vehicles destroyed more Iraqi tanks during the war than the M1A1 Abrams heavy Main Battle Tanks.

Both AT (TOW) Company, 2nd Tank Battalion, 2nd Marine Division and AT (TOW) Company, 3rd Tank Battalion, 1st Marine Division engaged Iraqi tanks with TOW missiles in their M1045/M1046 HMMWVs. These vehicles were configured with a roof-mounted TOW launcher and carried six rounds in the cargo compartment with an additional round in the tube.

The British Army also deployed TOW-armed, Westland Lynx helicopters to the conflict, where they were used to attack Iraqi armored vehicles. This was the first recorded use of the TOW missile from a British helicopter.

=== 1993: Somalia ===
On 5 June, 24 Pakistani soldiers were killed by members of Mohamed Farrah Aidid's Habr Gidr militia; some were skinned. Subsequently, the United Nations called for the arrest of those responsible. Weeks later they would formally place the blame on Aidid, leader of the Habr Gidr clan. Subsequently, U.N. troops hunted Aidid. Incidents between the two sides worsened, with fighting back and forth. On 12 July, three months before the Battle of Mogadishu, the United Nations and the United States attempted to defeat Aidid's organization by attacking a strategy meeting of his native Habr Gidr clan under Operation Michigan. The Washington Post described the event as a "slaughter" in which a "half-dozen" AH-1 Cobra attack helicopters fired 16 TOW missiles and 2,000 rounds from their 20 mm cannons into the meeting of the elders and senior combat commanders. The first TOW missile destroyed the stairs, preventing escape. In the aftermath, it was revealed that Aidid was not in the meeting. The Red Cross claimed that 54 people had been killed, Admiral Jonathan T. Howe reported that 20 had died, while Aidid's Somali National Alliance produced a list of 73 people who they claimed had been killed.

=== 2001: War in Afghanistan ===
TOW missiles were used during the War in Afghanistan.

=== 2003: Iraq War ===
Ten Humvee-mounted TOW missiles were used by U.S. forces in Iraq during the 22 July 2003 assault that killed Uday and Qusay Hussein. Although TOW missiles are generally used against armored vehicles, these missiles were used on the house where the two men were located.

=== 2011: Syrian Civil War ===
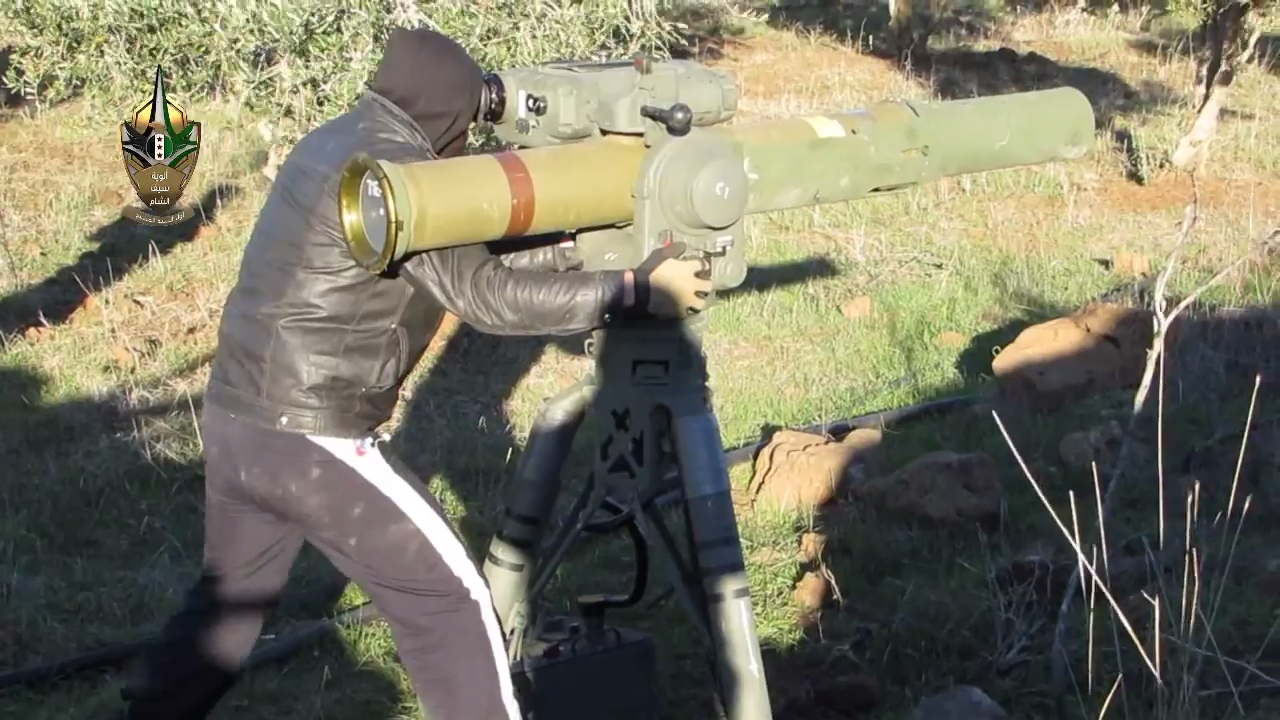
A member of the Free Syrian Army – Southern Front's Sword of al-Sham Brigades prepares to launch a BGM-71E TOW at a Syrian Arab Army position in southern Syria (December 2014)

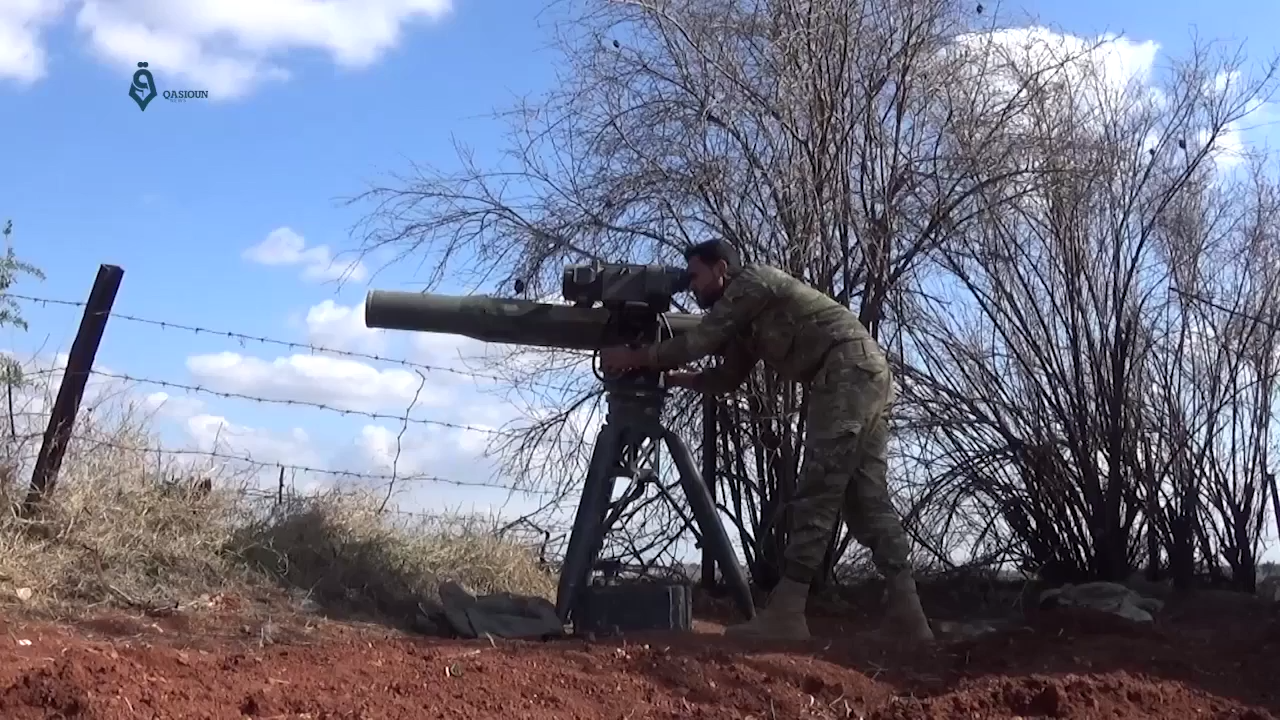
An Army of Glory fighter firing a BGM-71 TOW at a Syrian Army target north of Hama, Syria, in March 2017

The weapon was spotted as early as April 2014 in at least two videos that surfaced showing Syrian opposition forces in the Syrian civil war using BGM-71 TOWs, a weapon previously not seen in use by the opposition. Such a video, showing a BGM-71E-3B with the serial number removed, can be seen in a 27 May 2014 episode of the PBS series Frontline.

In February 2015, The Carter Center listed 23 groups within the Southern Front of the Free Syrian Army that have been documented using US-supplied TOWs.

A sudden influx of TOWs was supplied in May 2015, mostly to Free Syrian Army affiliated factions, but also independent Islamist battalions; as a requirement of being provided TOWs, these Syrian opposition groups are required to document the use of the missiles by filming their use and are also required to save the spent missile casings. Groups provided with TOWs include the Hazzm Movement, the 13th Division, 1st Coastal Division, Syria Revolutionaries Front, Yarmouk Army, Knights of Justice Brigade, and the 101st Division. Free Syrian Army battalions widely and decisively used TOWs in the 2015 Jisr al-Shughur offensive. Russia attempted a rescue operation after a Su-24M was shot down at the Syria–Turkey border on 24 November 2015, a video of Free Syrian Army 1st Coastal Division using a TOW missile to destroy a disabled Russian helicopter on the ground after its crew had retreated was posted on YouTube. In October 2015, Saudi Arabia delivered 500 TOW missiles to anti-Assad rebels. A video produced through Bulgarian Television provides evidence of non-rebel use of this weapon by Islamic-affiliated fighters.

Reports indicate that a small number of TOW missiles have ended up in the hands of al-Qaeda in Syria and Islamic State of Iraq and the Levant.

In August 2016 footage of the Syrian military inspecting a captured BGM-71E missile system in Bani Zeit district, Aleppo, was leaked online. On 2 September 2016, rebels released a video of a BGM-71 TOW destroying a French-manufactured Syrian Arab Air Force Aérospatiale Gazelle as it was landing on an airstrip near Khattab in Northern Hama.

=== 2022: Russo-Ukrainian War ===
In August 2022 the U.S. Department of Defense announced that it would be sending 1,500 TOW missiles (presumably BGM-71, though not explicitly specified as such) to Ukraine as part of an additional $775m security assistance package to the "meet Ukraine's critical security and defense needs" as part of ongoing US military assistance following the Russian invasion of Ukraine.

In April 2023, videos posted to Twitter showed Ukrainian forces using TOW missiles to destroy Russian tanks in the Bakhmut area, including their loading, use and mounting on a vehicle. A former National Security Council official said: "Such videos are just devastating. They show that even older weapons like TOW missiles can have a massive impact on Russian forces. These videos surely damage Russian morale as well."

On 19 July Hanna Maliar, Ukraine's deputy defense minister, claimed on Telegram that an M2 Bradley had killed Russian infantry during fighting in the Zaporizhzhia region. She further claimed that using TOW missiles the M2 Bradley was able to destroy two Russian T-72 tanks. The Bradley was assigned to the 47th Mechanized Brigade. These claims could not be independently verified.

== Variants ==
Raytheon (now RTX) has taken over for Hughes in recent years, and now handles production of all current variants, as well as TOW development.

| Designation | Description | Length | Diameter | Wingspan | Launch weight | Warhead | Armor penetration (est.) | Range | Speed |
|---|---|---|---|---|---|---|---|---|---|
| XBGM-71A/BGM-71A | Hughes Tube launched Optically tracked Wire command link guided (TOW) Missile | 1.16 m | 0.152 m | 0.46 m | 18.9 kg | 3.9 kg (2.4 kg HE) HEAT | 430 mm (estimated value) | 65–3,750 m (2.33 mi) | 179 m/s |
| BGM-71B | BGM-71A variant; improved range | 1.16 m | 0.152 m | 0.46 m | 18.9 kg | 3.9 kg (2.4 kg HE) HEAT | 430 mm (estimated value) | 65–3,750 m (2.33 mi) | 179 m/s |
| BGM-71C | BGM-71B variant; Improved TOW (ITOW) w/ improved shaped-charge warhead | 1.41 m (probe extended); 1.17 m (probe folded) | 0.152 m | 0.46 m | 19.1 kg | 3.9 kg (2.4 kg HE) HEAT | 630 mm (exact value) | 65–3,750 m (2.33 mi) | 179 m/s |
| BGM-71D | BGM-71C variant; TOW-2, improved guidance, motor and enlarged main warhead | 1.51 m (probe extended); 1.17 m (probe folded) | 0.152 m | 0.46 m | 21.5 kg | 5.9 kg (3.1 kg HE) HEAT | 900 mm | 65–3,750 m (2.33 mi) | 179 m/s |
| BGM-71E | BGM-71D variant; TOW-2A optimized to defeat reactive armor with tandem warheads | 1.51 m (probe extended); 1.17 m (probe folded) | 0.152 m | 0.46 m | 22.6 kg | 5.9 kg (3.1 kg HE) HEAT | 900 mm (behind a layer of ERA) | 65–3,750 m (2.33 mi) | 188 m/s |
| BGM-71F | BGM-71D variant; TOW-2B top-down attack variant using explosively formed penetrators | 1.168 m | 0.152 m | 0.46 m | 22.6 kg | 6.14 kg EFP | no data | 200–4,500 m (2.8 mi) (Note: 4,200m for TOW-2B Aero, 3,750 m for TOW-2B.) | 179 m/s |
| BGM-71G | BGM-71F variant; different AP warhead; not produced | no data | 0.152 m | 0.46 m | no data | no data | no data | no data | 179 m/s |
| BGM-71H | BGM-71E variant; "bunker buster" variant for use against fortified structures | no data | 0.152 m | 0.46 m | no data | no data | 200 mm double reinforced concrete | 65–4,200 m (2.6 mi) | 179 m/s |

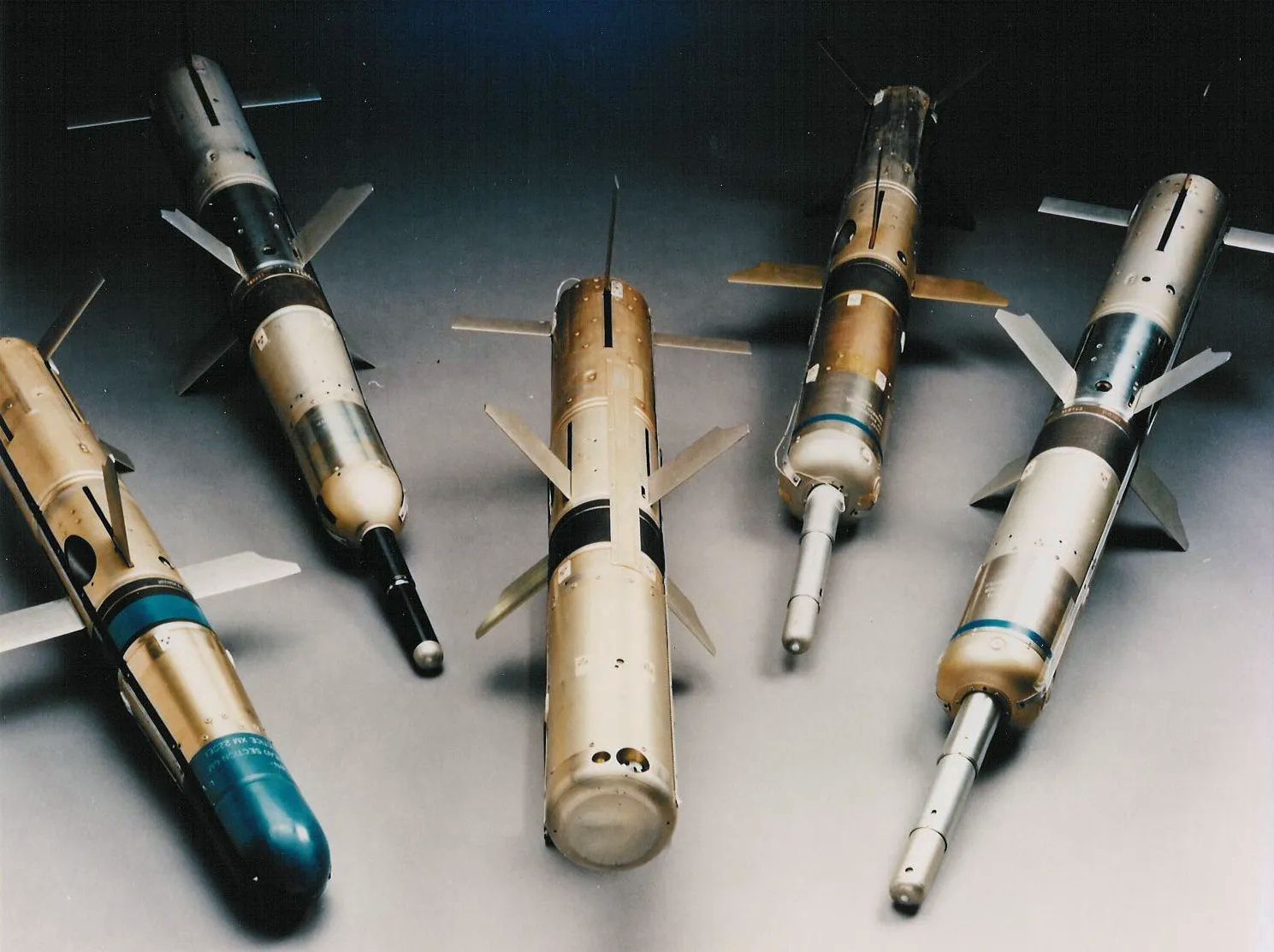
left-right: BGM-71A BASIC; BGM-71C ITOW; BGM-71F TOW 2B; BGM-71D TOW 2; BGM-71E TOW 2A

While the original armor penetration estimates were 600 mm for BGM-71A/B and 700–800 mm for BGM-71C, a now declassified CIA study shows the CIA's estimated penetration values against a vertical target are much lower—just 430 mm for the BGM-71A/B TOW and 630 mm for the BGM-71C Improved TOW.

The time to target at maximum range is 20 seconds, therefore, giving an average speed of 187.5 m/s.

== International ==
Iran has reverse engineered the type from examples acquired before 1979 and currently manufactures duplicate TOW missiles. These carry the Iranian designation of Toophan.

Sweden had SAAB develop a helicopter launch system called HeliTow (Rbs 55H) for the Helikopter 9.

== Operators ==
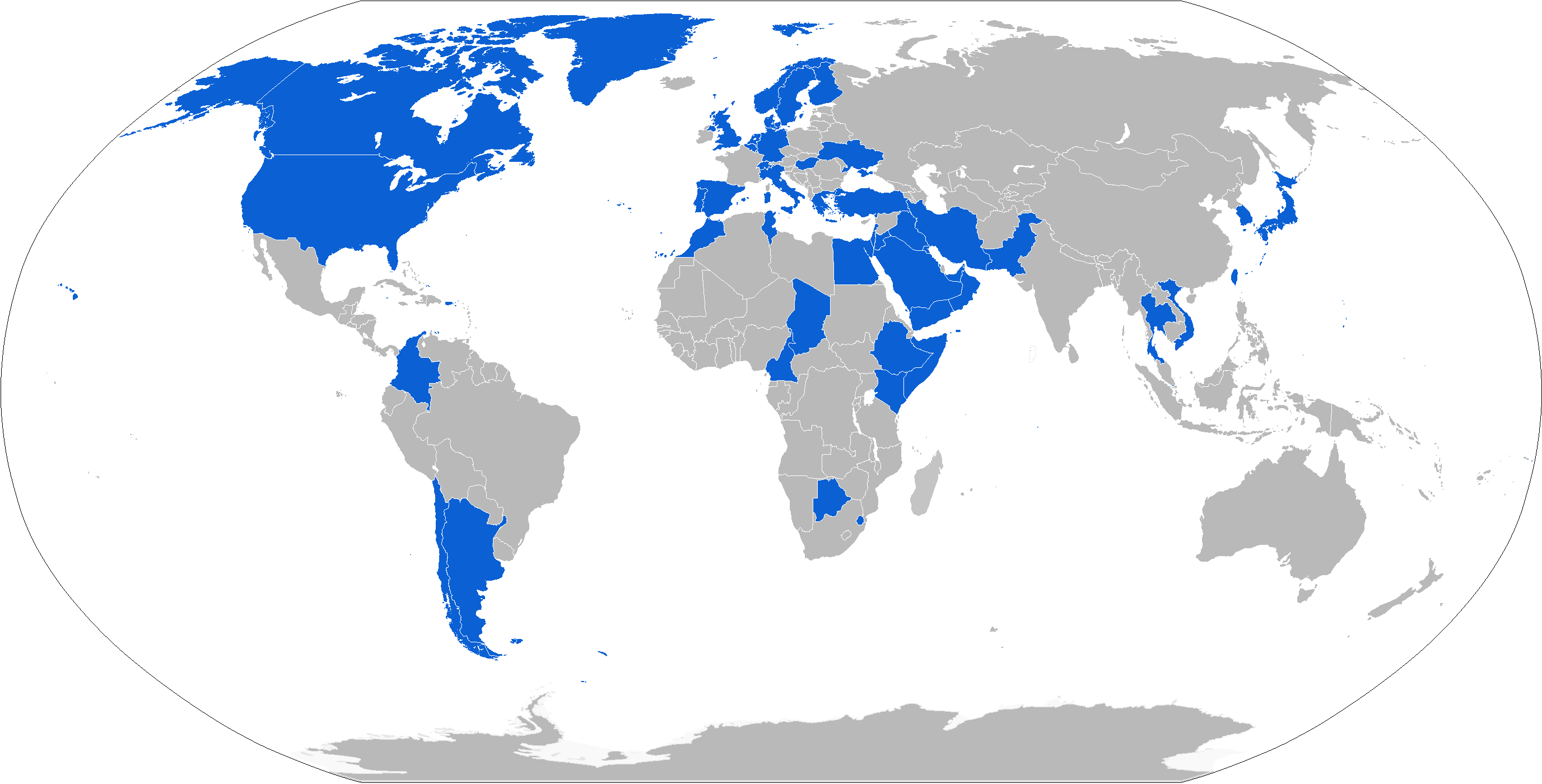
Map with BGM-71 operators in blue

=== Current ===
- Afghanistan
- Argentina: TOW-2.
- Bahrain: BGM-71A TOW.
- Belgium: AgustaWestland AW109 A109 AH(L)-TOW helicopter only
- Botswana
- Cameroon: Mounted on Jeeps.
- Canada: 147 launchers in service in 2000
- Croatia
- Chile
- Chad
- Colombia
- Denmark
- Egypt: Produced under license by Arab-British Dynamics
- Eswatini
- Ethiopia
- Finland
- Free Syrian Army
- Germany
- Greece:
- Hezbollah
- Hungary
- Iran Local production under the name "Toophan" (طوفان)
- Iraq: Iranian version used by PMF militias.
- Italy: Total of 432 launchers. 5,000 BGM-71 missiles and 130 launchers delivered in 1974; 10,000 missiles delivered in 1976–1978; 2,311 ITOWs delivered in 1982–1984; 6,629 BGM-71C ITOWs delivered in 1986–1989 for $67 million (of which 1,239 were practice missiles); 1,440 BGM-71D TOW2s for A129 Mangusta delivered in 1990–1996
- Japan
- Jordan:
- Kurdistan
- Kenya
- Kuwait
- Kosovo
- Lebanon
- Luxembourg
- Mexico
- Morocco: 70 launchers in service; 1,200 BGM-71-4B-RF TOW 2A RF missiles on order, approved for export on 8 December 2016
- Oman
- Pakistan
- Philippines
- Portugal: Used by the Army and Marines.
- Saudi Arabia: TOW-2A used by the Army and National Guard.
- Singapore
- South Korea:
- Spain: TOW and TOW-2 variants used by the Army and Marines.
- Sweden
- Switzerland
- Syria: Captured from rebel groups.
- Taiwan
- Thailand: Used by the Army and Marines.
- Tunisia
- Turkey
- Ukraine
- United Arab Emirates
- United States: Used by the Army and Marine Corps.
- Vietnam
- Yemen
- Houthis: Toophan.
- People's Defense Units (YPG)

=== Former ===
- Islamic State
- Israel
- Lebanese Forces: Seized from the Lebanese Army in 1984; mounted on Jeeps.
- Netherlands: The decision to replace the M47 Dragon (in use with reconnaissance units) and TOW (in use with mechanized infantry) with the "Gill MRAT" was made in 2001, with deliveries expected in 2002. The first Gill MRAT was issued in 2004 to the Regiment van Heutsz.
- Norway: Replaced by FGM-148 Javelin.
- Somalia: Used during the Siad Barre era.
- UNITA/FALA: Delivered from the United States in 1987; mounted on Jeeps and Humvees.
- United Kingdom: Operated from Army Air Corps Westland Lynx helicopters

=== Failed bids ===
- Yugoslavia: In the early 1980s, negotiations to supply Yugoslavia with modern United States-manufactured TOW anti-tank guided missiles broke down after the discovery that Yugoslavia had violated the terms of a prior [arms] transfer by sending M-47 tanks to the new revolutionary regime in Ethiopia in the early 1980s.

== Gallery ==
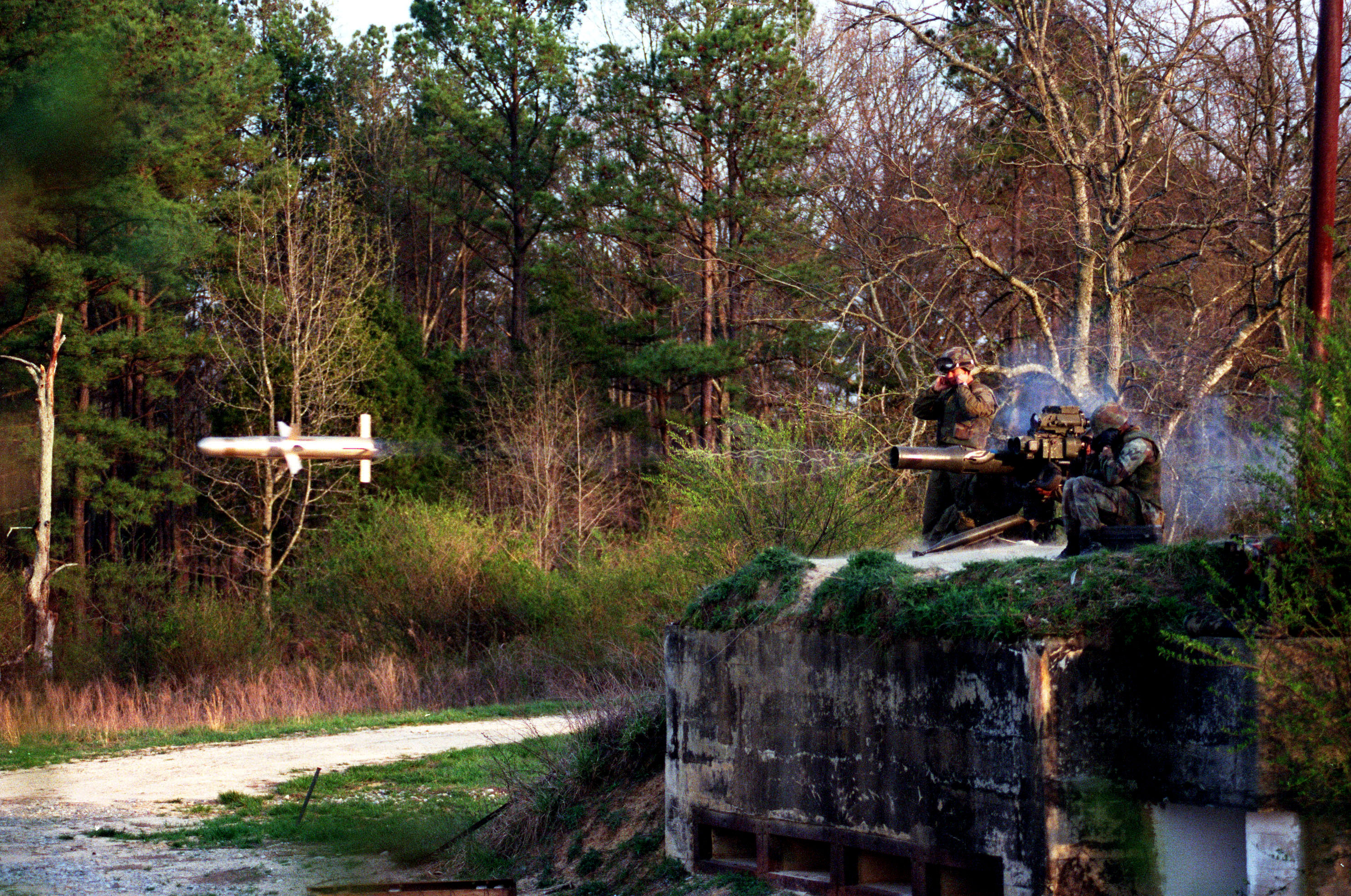
Launch, trailing wire is noticeable

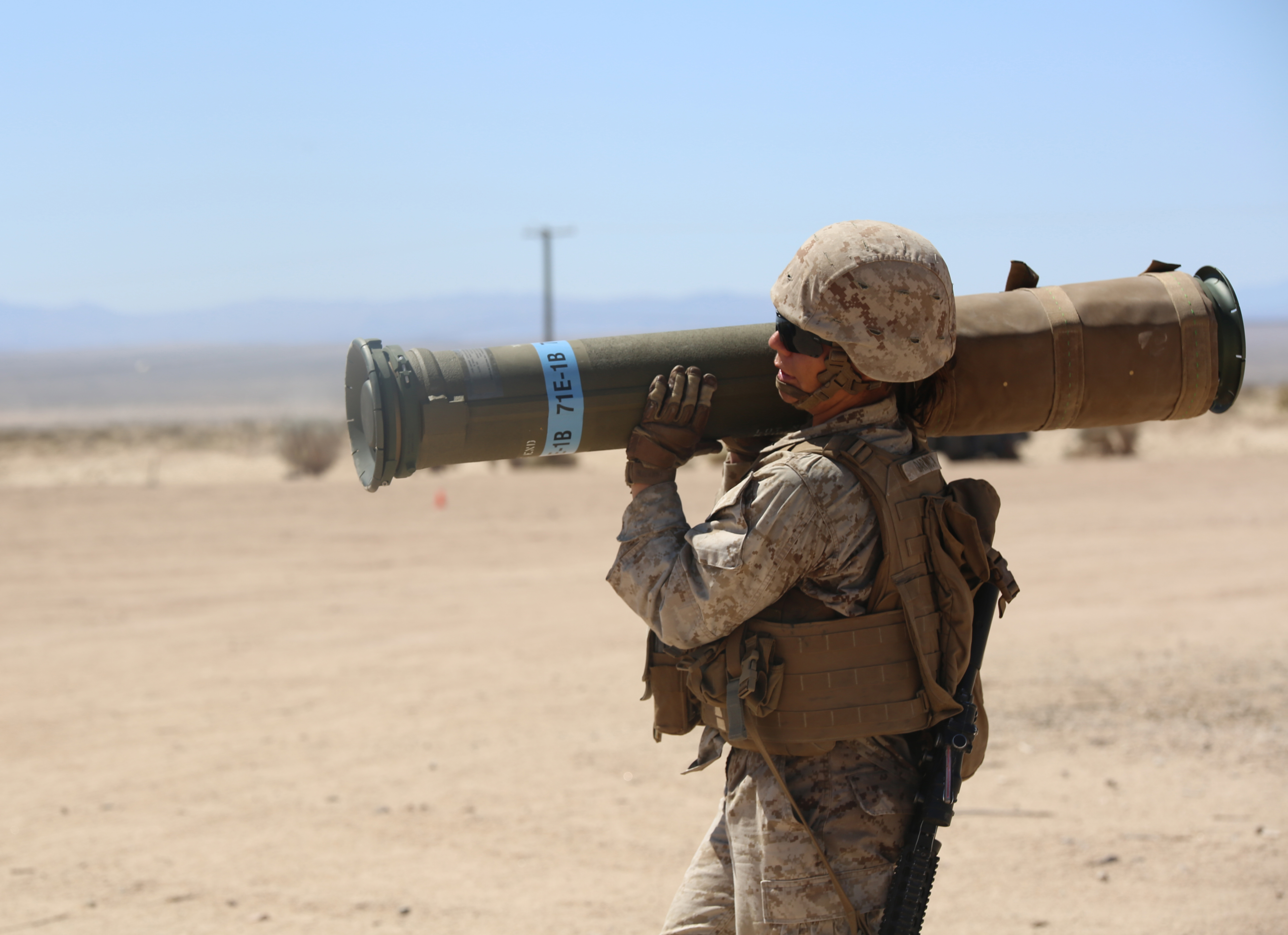
A US Marine carrying a BTM-71E practice round

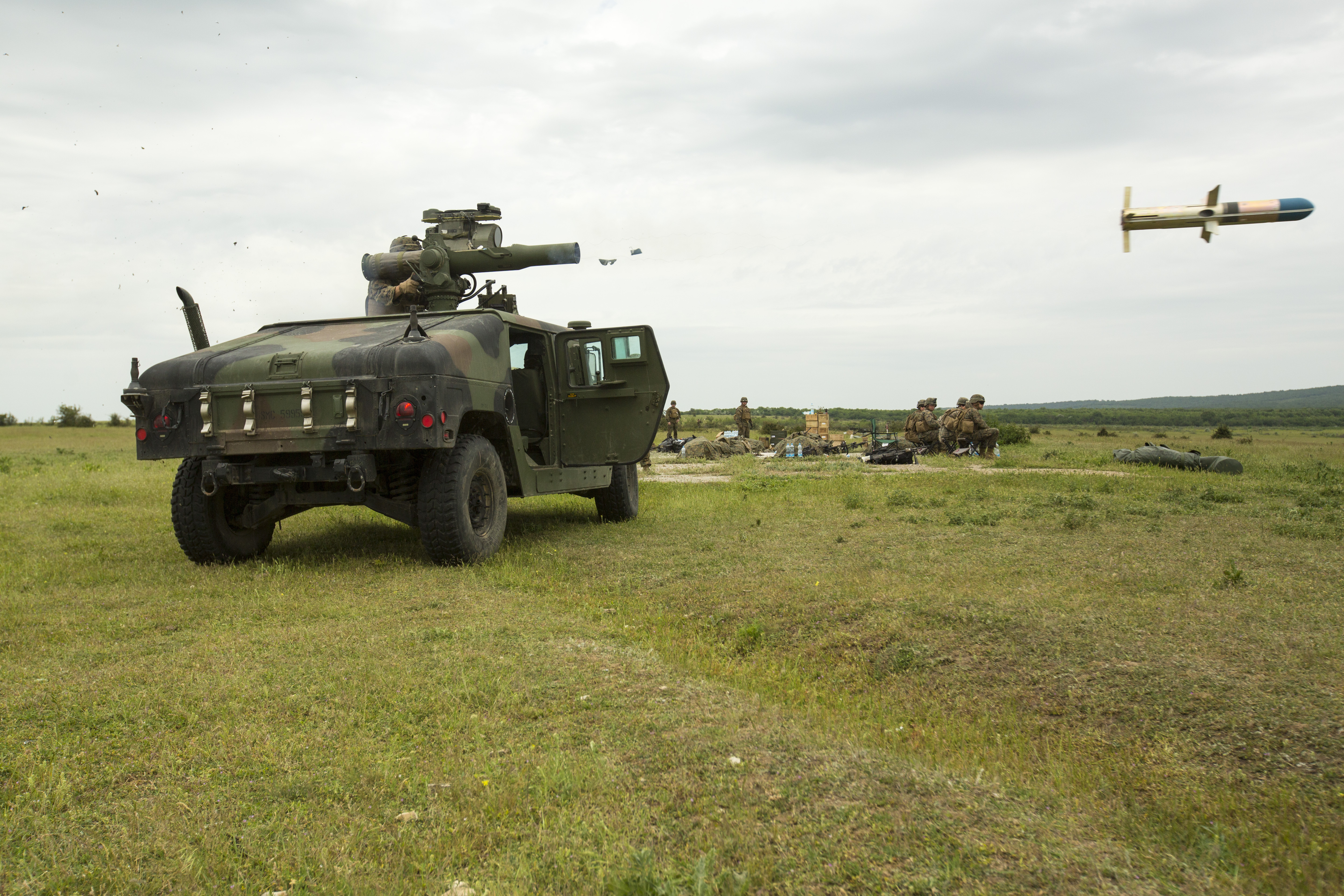
A TOW fired from a US Marine Corps Humvee during training, in 2014

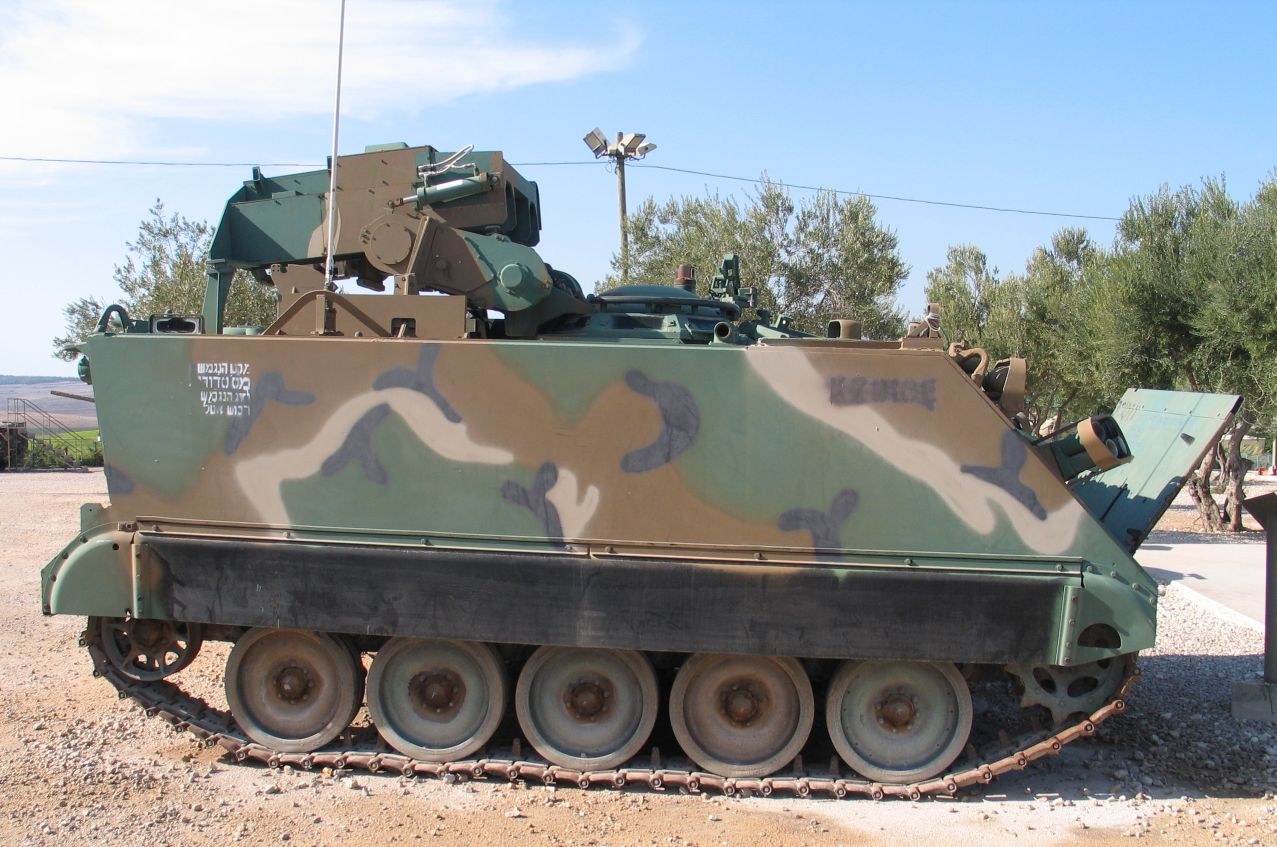
An M901 ITV in Israel, in 2005

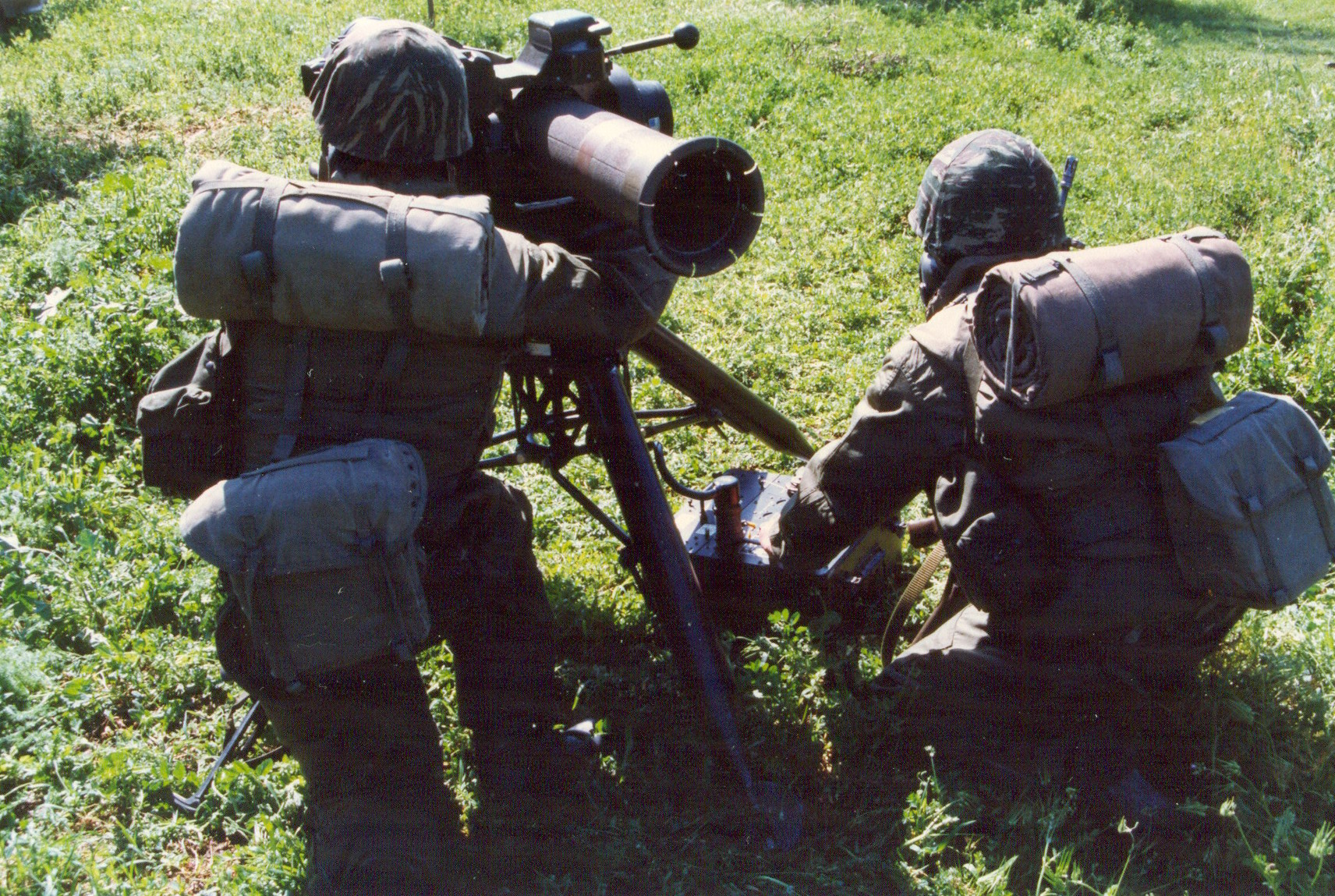
A Greek TOW on the ground

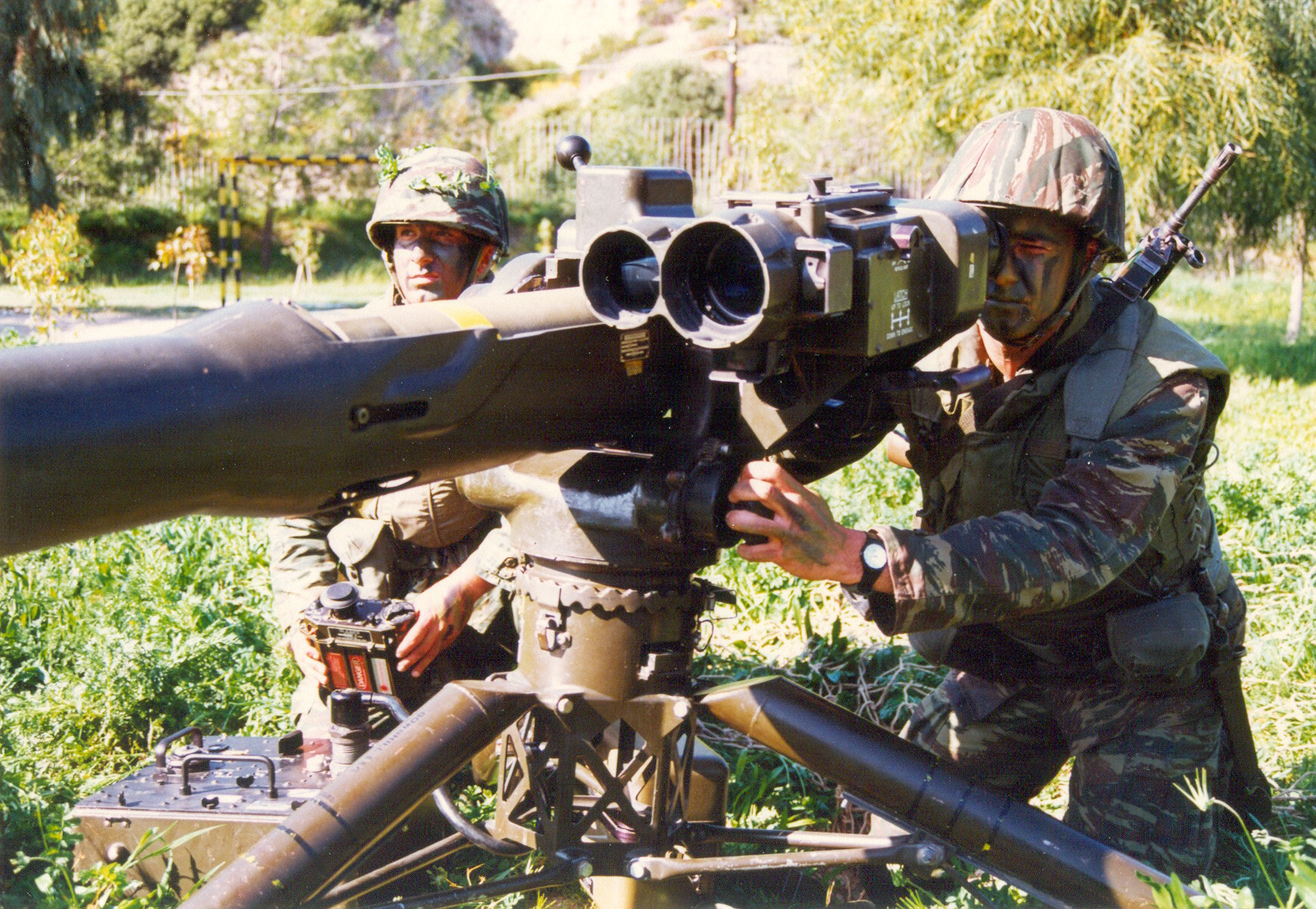
Greek soldiers manning a TOW unit

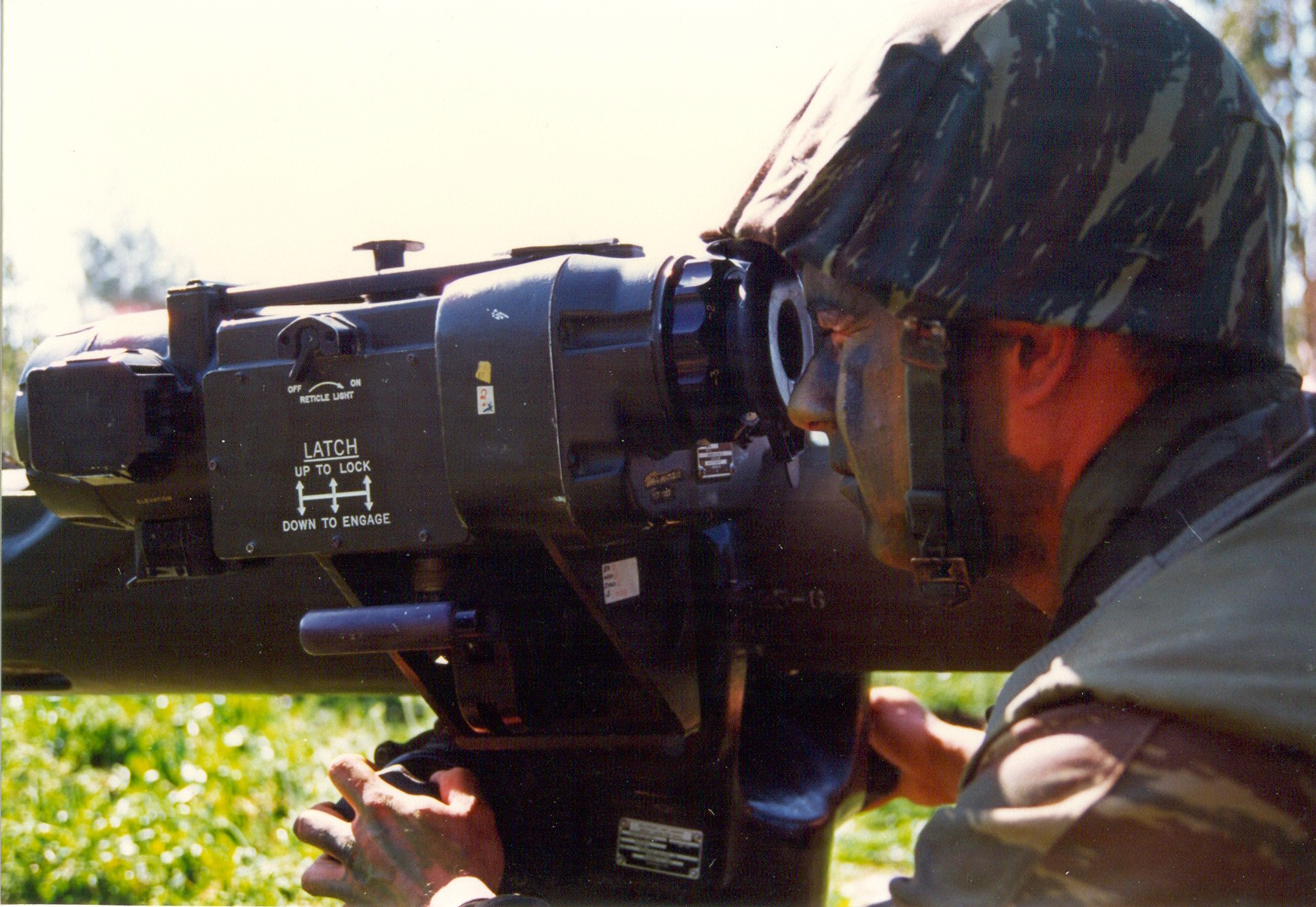
The sight on a Hellenic Army BGM-71 TOW

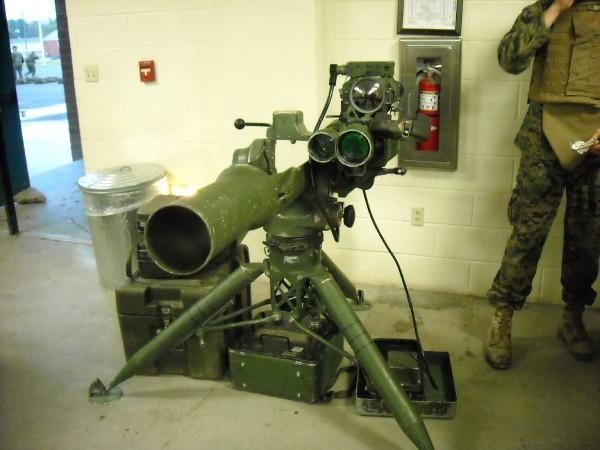
A ground-mounted TOW system

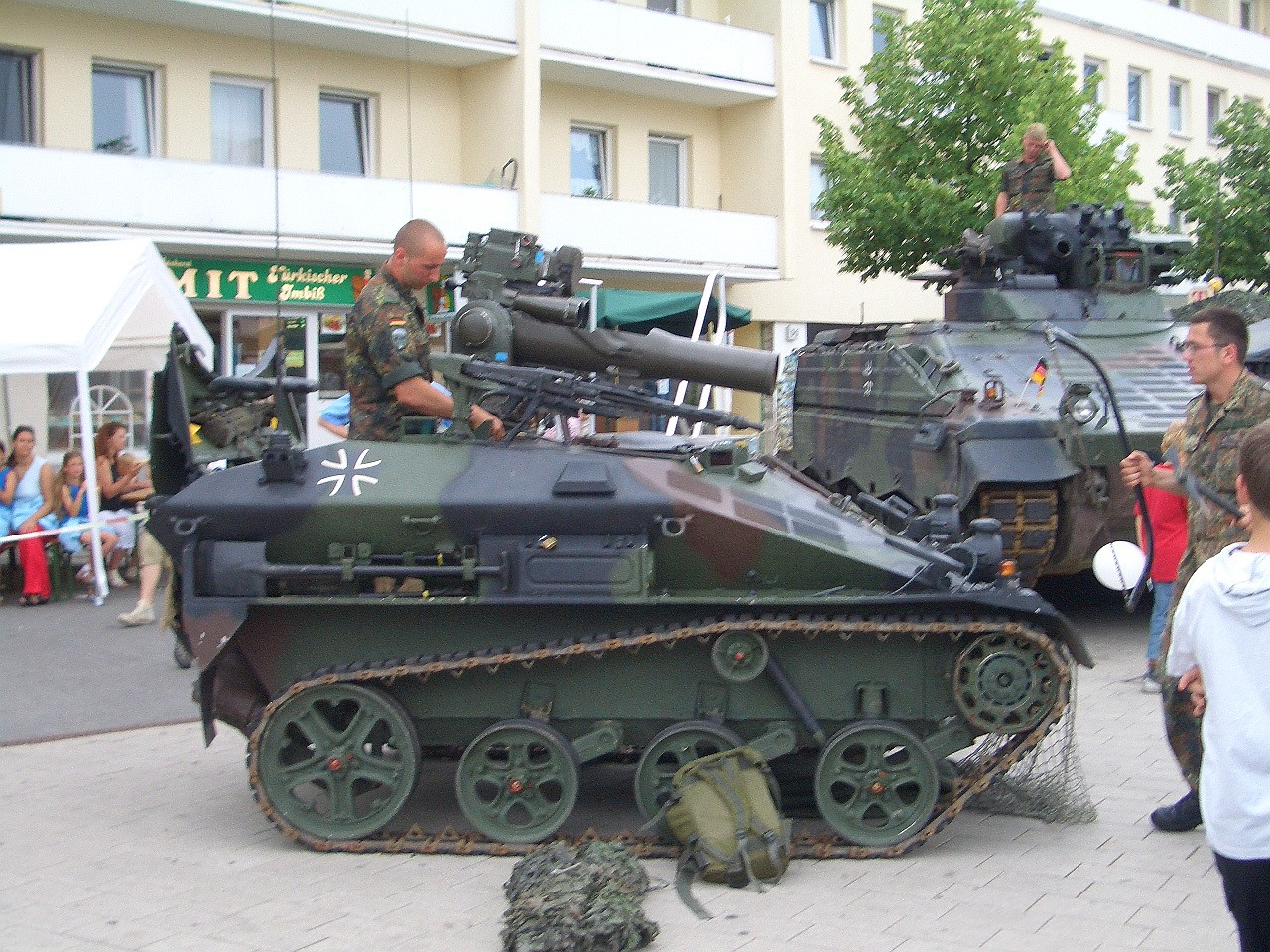
A BGM-71 TOW-armed Wiesel AWC of the German Army

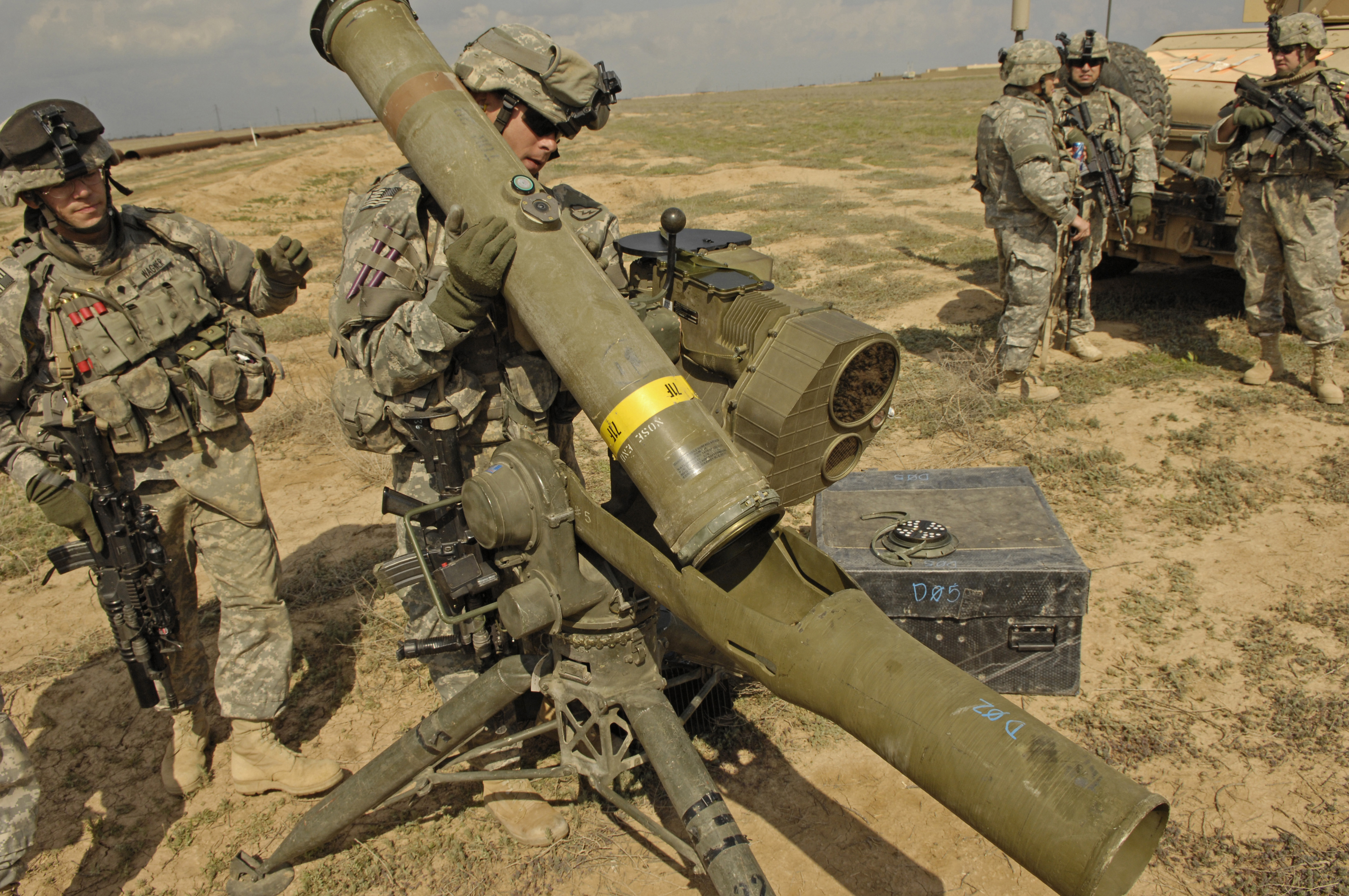
US Army soldiers assembling an ITAS (Improved Target Acquisition System) TOW Missile system, in Iraq, in 2007

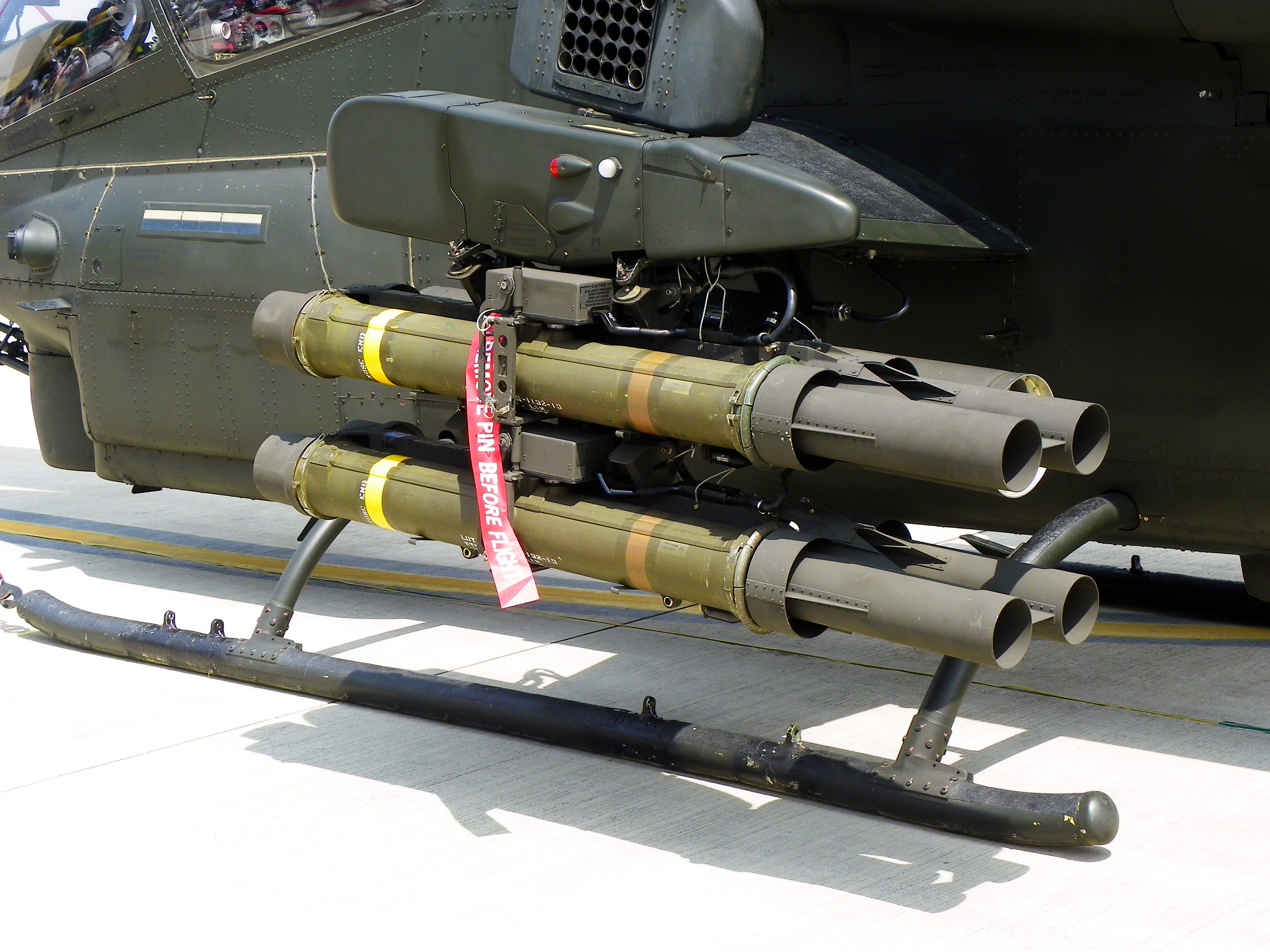
An AH-1W SuperCobra of the Republic of China Army armed with an XM65 launcher and four TOW missiles

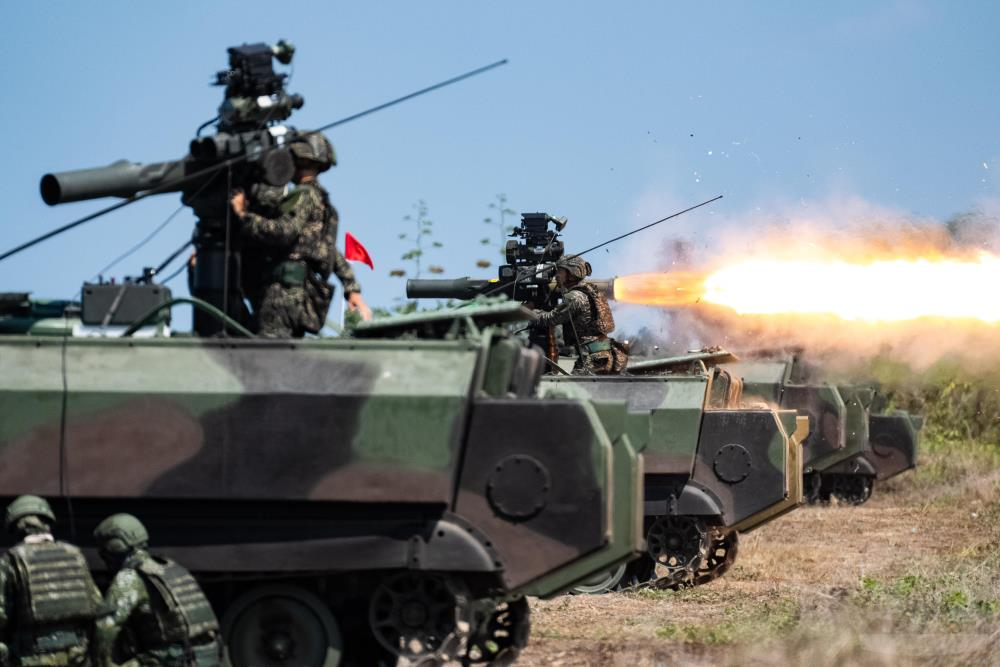
Republic of China Marine Corps 99th Brigade's several CM-25 armored vehicle launches BGM-71 TOW missiles

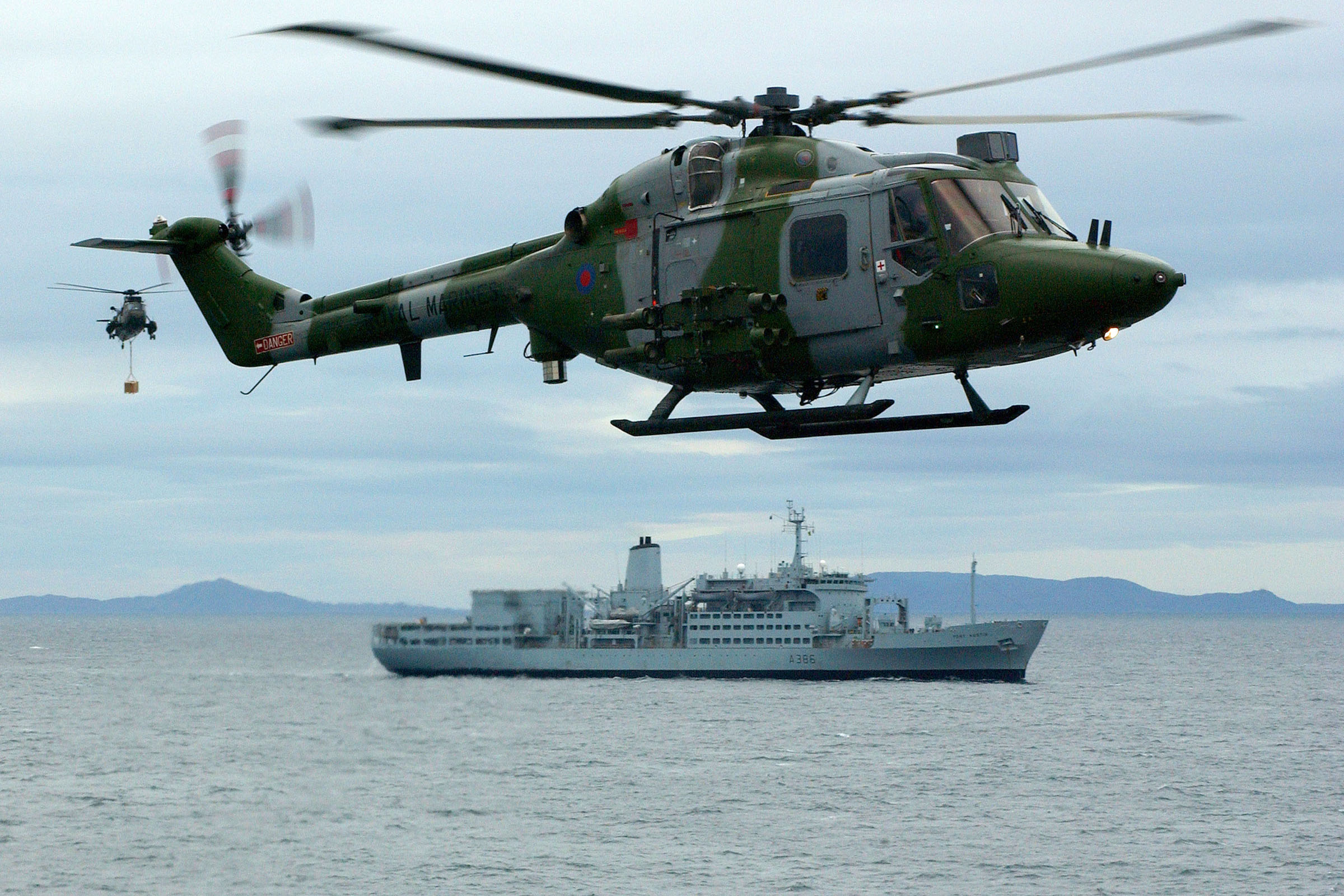
A Lynx AH.7 of the Royal Marines fitted with TOW missile launchers

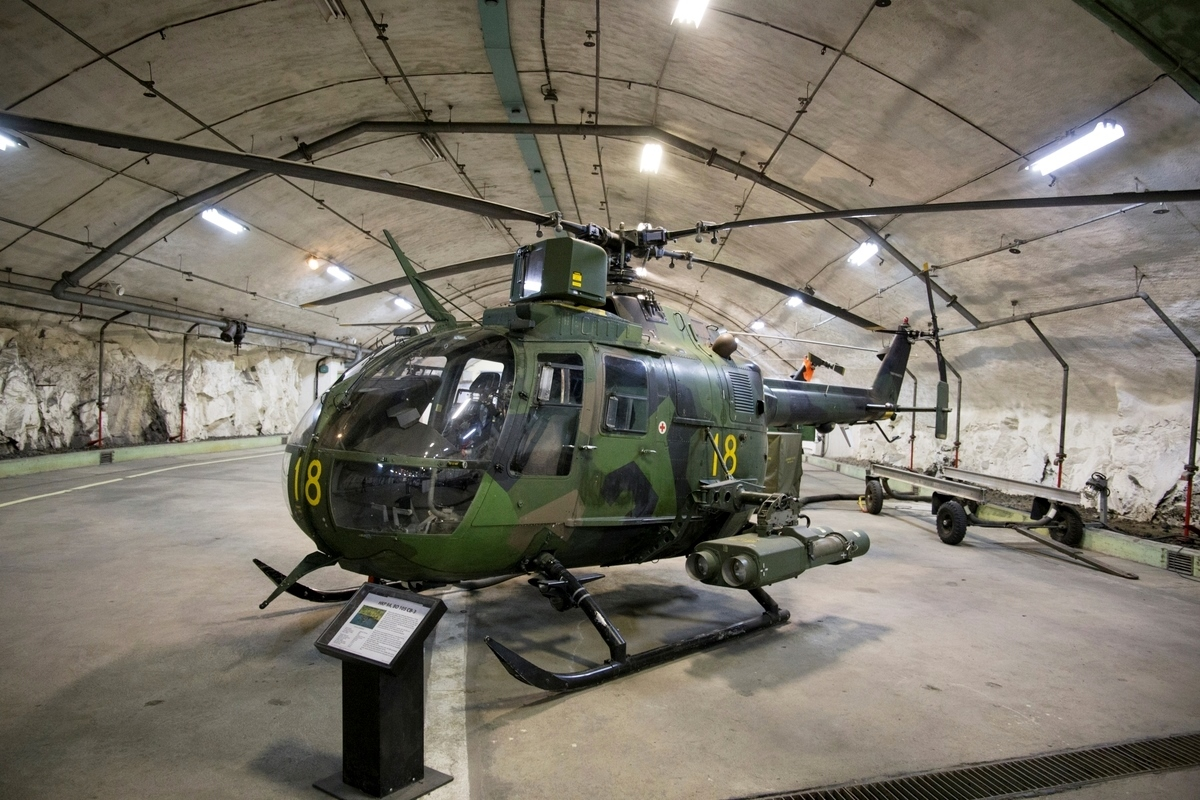
Swedish light anti-tank helicopter 9A (MBB BO 105) with HeliTOW launchers mounted

== See also ==
- 9K111 Fagot – (Soviet Union)
- 9M113 Konkurs – (Soviet Union)
- 9M133 Kornet – (Russia)
- AGM-179 JAGM – (United States)
- ALAS (missile) – (Serbia)
- FGM-148 Javelin – (United States)
- HJ-8 – (China)
- HOT (missile) – (West Germany)
- M47 Dragon – (United States)
- MAPATS – (Israel)
- MILAN – (France, West Germany)
- Nag ATGM – (India)
- OMTAS – (Turkey)
- Shershen – (Belarus)
- Swingfire – (United Kingdom)
- Abu TOW
- History of UAVs decoys
- List of U.S. Army rocket launchers

== Sources ==
- "TOW". Redstone Arsenal. Archived from the original on 21 November 2009.
- The TOW Family
- TOW Improved Target Acquisition System (ITAS)
- The TOW Anti-Tank Missile in Vietnam
- Dunstan, Simon (1982). Vietnam Tracks-Armor in Battle. Osprey Publications. ISBN 0-89141-171-2.
- Gunston, Bill (1983). An Illustrated Guide to Modern Airborne Missiles. London: Salamander Books Ltd. ISBN 0-86101-160-0.
- Starry, Donn A. General. Mounted Combat in Vietnam. Vietnam Studies; Department of the Army. First printed 1978-CMH Pub 90–17.
- Lister, David (2020). The Dark Age of Tanks: Britain's Lost Armour, 1945–1970. Pen and Sword. ISBN 9781526755179.
- Foss, Christopher F., ed. (2005). Jane's Armour and Artillery 2005-2006. Jane's Information Group. ISBN 978-0-7106-2686-8.
- Samer Kassis, 30 Years of Military Vehicles in Lebanon, Beirut: Elite Group, 2003. ISBN 9953-0-0705-5
- Steven J. Zaloga and Hugh Johnson, HMMWV Humvee 1980–2005: US Army tactical vehicle, New Vanguard series 122, Osprey Publishing Ltd., Oxford 2006. ISBN 978 1 841769462
- Zachary Sex & Bassel Abi-Chahine, Modern Conflicts 2 – The Lebanese Civil War, from 1975 to 1991 and Beyond, Modern Conflicts Profile Guide Volume II, AK Interactive, 2021. EAN 8435568306073
