= Marayan =

Marayan مرعيان Mir'ian
- Town
- Location in Syria
- Coordinates: 35°44′22″N 36°33′43″E
- Country: Syria
- Governorate: Idlib
- District: Ariha
- Subdistrict: Ihsim

Population (2004)
  - Total: 2,274
- Time zone: UTC+2 (EET)
  - Summer (DST): UTC+3 (EEST)

Marayan (Arabic: مرعيان, also spelled Mir'ian) is a village in northwestern Syria, administratively part of the Ariha District of the Idlib Governorate. According to the Syria Central Bureau of Statistics, Marayan had a population of 2,274 in the 2004 census. Its inhabitants are predominantly Sunni Muslims. Nearby localities include Ihsim and Iblin to the south, Sarjah to the east, and al-Rami and Ariha to the north.

In the 1960s, Marayan was a small village containing a mosque and a spring. In the village's immediate vicinity are the ruins of Byzantine-era grottoes, which were being used as underground residences in the 1960s.

== Bibliography ==
- Boulanger, Robert (1966). The Middle East, Lebanon, Syria, Jordan, Iraq, Iran. Hachette.
