= Ihsim =

Ihsim إِحْسِم Ehsem
- Town
- Location in Syria
- Coordinates: 35°43′12″N 36°33′39″E
- Country: Syria
- Governorate: Idlib
- District: Ariha
- Subdistrict: Ihsim

Population (2004)
  - Total: 5,870
- Time zone: UTC+2 (EET)
  - Summer (DST): UTC+3 (EEST)

Ihsim (Arabic: إِحْسِم, romanized: ʾIḥsim, also spelled Ehsem) is a town in northwestern Syria, administratively part of the Ariha District of the Idlib Governorate. According to the Syria Central Bureau of Statistics, Ihsim had a population of 5,870 in the 2004 census. It is the administrative center of the Ihsim Subdistrict, which contained a total of 19 localities with a collective population of 65,409 in 2004. Nearby localities include Iblin to the west, al-Barah to the south, al-Dana, Syria to the east, and Marayan to the north.
