= Vickers Vigilant =

Vigilant
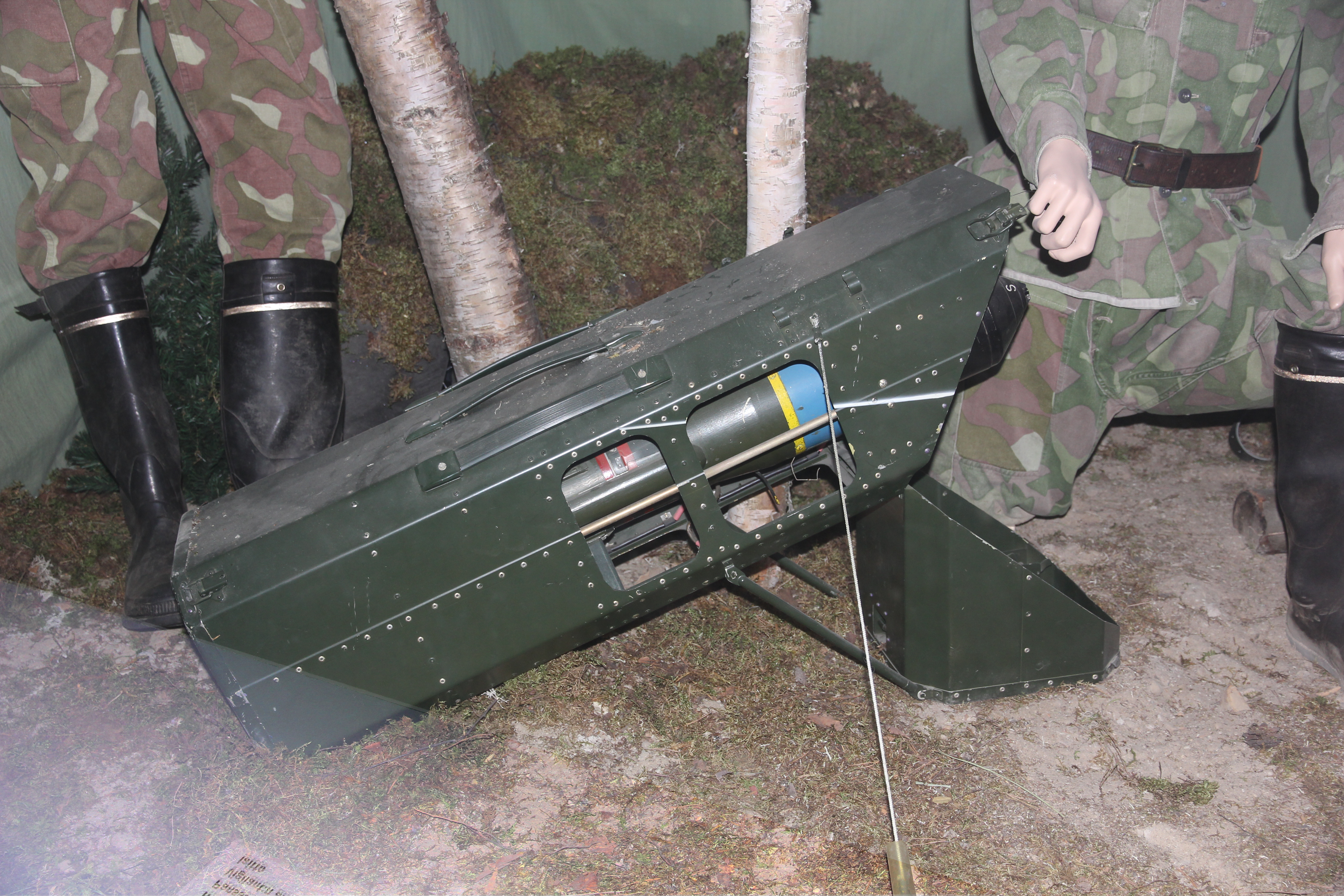
- Vickers Vigilant
- Type: Wire-guided anti-tank missile
- Place of origin: United Kingdom

Service history
- In service: 1960s
- Used by: United Kingdom, Finland, Kuwait, United Arab Emirates, Switzerland, United States
- Wars: none

Production history
- Designed: 1956
- Manufacturer: Vickers-Armstrongs (Aircraft) Ltd

Specifications
- Mass: 31 lb (14 kg)
- Length: 3.5 ft (1.07 m)
- Diameter: 0.12 m
- Wingspan: 0.27 m
- Warhead: HEAT, 6 kg
- Detonation mechanism: impact
- Engine: I.C.I. dual-thrust solid fuel rocket
- Operational range: 200 m to 1375 m
- Maximum speed: 348 mph (155.6 m/s)
- Guidance system: MCLOS wire-guided
- Steering system: control surfaces
- Launch platform: infantry or vehicle

The Vickers Vigilant was a British 1960s era MCLOS wire-guided anti-tank missile used by the British Army. It was also licence-built in the United States by Clevite for the US Marine Corps, and sometimes known as Clevite rounds in this case.

Development began at Vickers-Armstrongs in 1956 as a private project to give the company's Weybridge Guided Missile Department something to do after the cancellation of Red Dean. By 1960 it had completed development and an extensive testing program, but the War Office remained uninterested as they wished for the Weybridge department to be disbanded as part of the ongoing formation of British Aircraft Corporation. On several occasions the Office explicitly stated they did not want to provide any encouragement to the team as this might make it harder to close the division down in the future.

After considerable debate spanning several years, the project eventually won an initial order as it was the only suitable design to arm the Ferret armoured car. By this time the War Office had already decided that their ultimate weapon for this role would be the Swingfire, but it would not be available until 1966 at the earliest. An order for several thousand Vigilant was placed late in 1961 as an "interim weapon". The order immediately resulted in several additional orders from Kuwait, Saudi Arabia, Libya and Abu Dhabi, along with Vigilant-armed Ferret sales to the UAE and Yemen. The order also sealed the US decision to license Vigilant for local production.

Swingfire did not arrive until 1969, and during that time the medium-range man portable version had been dropped. This left the Vigilant in use with the infantry and airborne forces well into the 1970s. Approximately 18,000 were produced in total.

== History ==
=== Previous efforts ===
Vickers-Armstrongs had been developing guided missiles from the earliest stages of UK research in the field, setting up the Guided Weapons Department at Weybridge (Brooklands) in Surrey. By the mid-1950s had been involved in four projects, all of which were cancelled. The last, the Red Dean/Red Hebe air-to-air missile was so delayed and over-designed that the company began to have a bad reputation with the Ministry of Supply, especially with John Clemow, the Director.

When Red Hebe was cancelled in the aftermath of the 1957 Defence White Paper, the company's guided missile department had no remaining projects. Unwilling to give up on the missile field, George Edwards led an effort to find a new project that could be undertaken with company funds alone. This led them to the ideas of John Housego and Jal Daboo for a lightweight anti-tank missile. They were already aware of the British Army's unhappiness with the recently deployed Malkara anti-tank missile, and felt there was an opportunity here. In 1956, Edwards convinced the board to take up the development of a replacement for Malkara using a new guidance system developed in-house.

=== Earlier designs ===
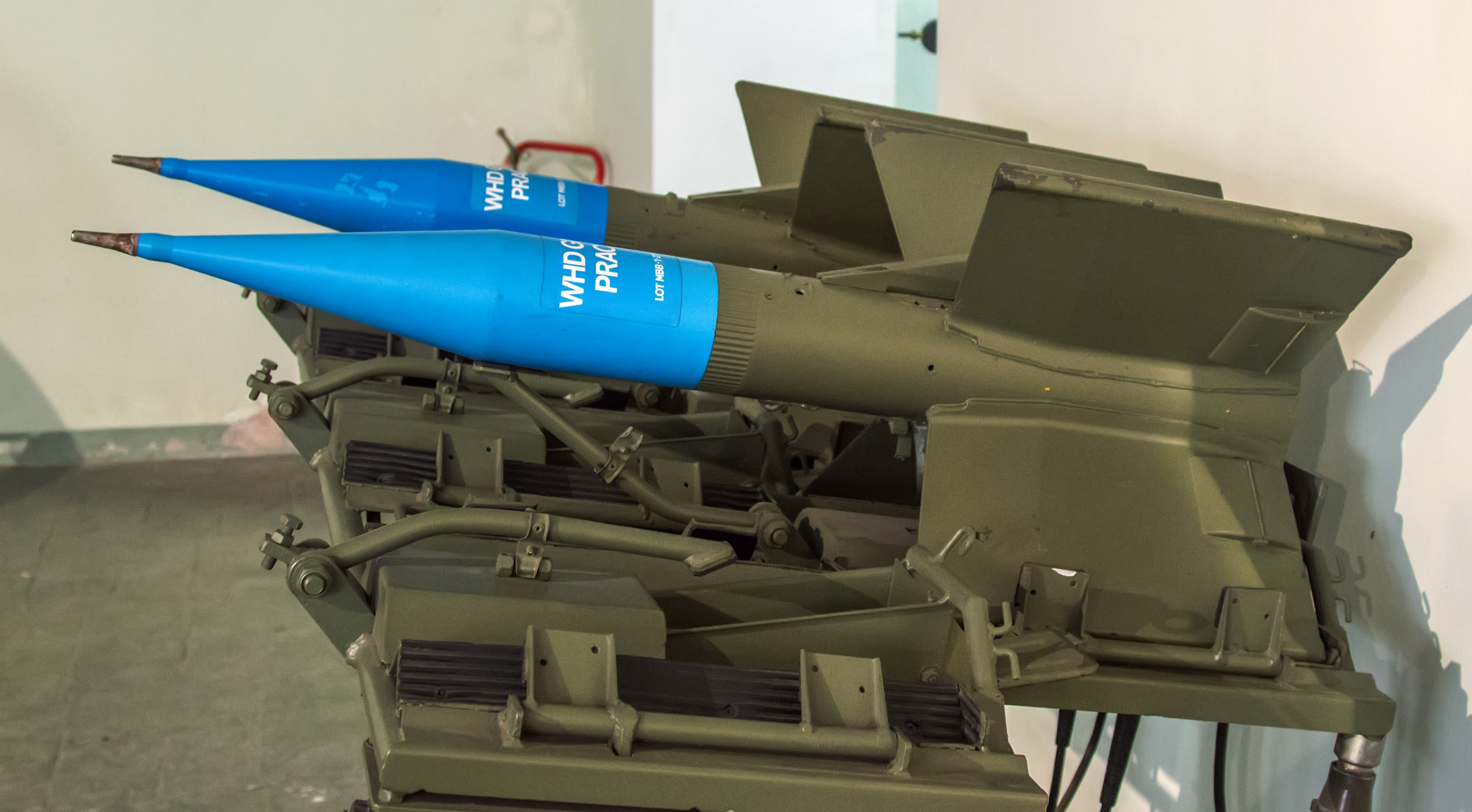
The Cobra was typical of 1950s anti-tank missile designs, with very large wings and spoilers for control.

Malkara was one of the earliest anti-tank missiles, and had several problems. Primary among these was the Army's ongoing interest in the use of large high-explosive squash head (HESH) warheads instead of the more common high-explosive anti-tank (HEAT) used by most anti-tank weapons of the era. For any given level of penetration, HESH required much more explosive, and Malkara's need to deal with main battle tanks demanded a 57 pounds (26 kg) warhead. Combined with the long desired range, 3,000 yards (2,700 m), the missile ended up being 206 pounds (93 kg), far too heavy to make it man portable.

The guidance system was also less than ideal. This consisted of a small joystick that the operator used to guide the missile while visually comparing its position with the target, aided by a bright flare on the missile. When the operator pushed the stick to the right, for instance, it operated the control surfaces to turn the missile to the right. The problem was that the missile would continue moving to the right after the control was released, eventually crossing the line of sight, continuing onto the right side of the target, and then requiring left input to stop this motion. This often led to the operator repeatedly overcorrecting the path of the missile, which required significant amounts of training to overcome. The same basic guidance system was used by most contemporary designs like the ENTAC, SS.10 and SS.11, and the Cobra, as well as the US Army's experimental Dart that was not put into production.

Another problem with all of these designs was their size. They all traced their development history to WWII-era German experiments with the Ruhrstahl X-4 in the anti-tank role [the X-7]. These used spoilerons as controls, with limited control authority. In order to provide enough lift to manoeuvre the missile at reasonable speeds, very large wings were needed. This resulted in bulky designs that were large and impractical for carrying manually.

=== Development begins ===
Sure that a contract for a Malkara replacement would be forthcoming, Vickers hired John Clemow, their critic, along with Howard Surtees, to head up the new effort. Development began in late 1956 under the model number 891 and given the name Vigilant, for VIsually Guided Infantry Light ANti-Tank missile.

Setting the range at 1,500 yards (1,400 m), half that of Malkara, greatly reduced the size of the rocket motor required. They approached Imperial Chemical Industries (ICI) who developed a lightweight motor with the required performance. In order to reach their desired weight, the missile would have to use a light HEAT warhead. An advanced model had been designed by the Royal Armaments Research and Development Establishment (RARDE) but had not been released to industry, so an off-the-shelf design from the Swiss firm Constructions Méchaniques de Leman (CML) was chosen instead.

The guidance system consisted of two parts. The first was a gyroscope that measured the "up" direction and changed the control outputs so that the correct control fins were actuated no matter what angle the fuselage was compared to the ground. This allowed the missile to spin along its long axis, which was used to even out any asymmetry in the rocket thrust and ensure it flew in a relatively straight line.

The second part used two gyroscopes that measured the azimuth and altitude motion, referenced to the ground plane of the first gyro. This set was the key to the improved guidance system. If the user inputs a correction to the right, for instance, this motion would be seen in the horizontal-measuring gyro. When the control was released, the guidance system would input left control until the gyro was zeroed out again. This resulted in the missile always returning to a line of flight pointed directly away from the operator. To guide the weapon, the operator controlled it left or right until it visually overlapped the target and then released the control. The missile would automatically continue along that line until it hit the target. The second gyro, measuring the vertical motion, kept the missile flying level above the ground and mostly eliminated the need for vertical corrections during flight. This system had the added advantage of eliminating the effects of wind or remaining asymmetry in thrust. (Note: The 1959 Flight article describes only two gyros, not three. It is not clear if this was for the prototype missiles only, which is all that the article covers.)

With the autopilot providing smooth control, the need for slow-acting controls seen on earlier missiles was eliminated. Instead, the new design used large conventional ailerons that could point the missile as much as 30 degrees away from the line of flight. At these sorts of angles, the rocket motor itself was producing significant control thrust, allowing the wings to be much smaller. These were in the form of long short-chord rectangles that maintained lift at very high angles of attack. This led to a much more compact design.

Another idea in Vigilant was that the missile launcher was connected by a long wire to the guidance control. This allowed the launcher to be set up in any open location while the operator moved to a location with more cover. After launch, the operator would guide the missile into his line of sight and then correct it onto the target. Although the missile left a smoke trail back to the launcher, that was far enough from the operator to offer protection. Targets could be up to 40 degrees to either side of the launch position.

=== Testing ===
Uncontrolled tests were first carried out in the summer of 1957. The first examples of the guidance system were test fired in September 1958. (Note: Flight says July 1958.) By this time the original germanium transistors from Texas Instruments were replaced by silicon versions, which were both less expensive and much less sensitive to temperature. Mullard, the UK subsidiary of Philips, also took up production of the same transistors that year. Further improvements the next year allowed all temperature variation to be ignored, removing the need for Zener diodes that had provided this function. Testing also demonstrated that the guidance wires were not strong enough and tended to break, leading to extensive experiments to find a solution. The rocket exhaust impinging on the wire tended to pull the wire off the spool early in flight, so the spool arrangement was changed to avoid this.

Another change was to the form of the controller. This was originally in the form of a "Sten gun" like arrangement that was designed to be fired from the hip during the testing phase, but modified for use while prone for the production version. In testing it was found that the operator would input the incorrect vertical guidance command about 50% of the time, up instead of down for instance. After some experimentation a new design was developed used that used a cup-like arrangement that the operator inserted the front of their thumb into while their fingers held a pistol-like grip. In this version, guiding the missile down was accomplished by pulling the controller down, as opposed to pushing forward as on a conventional joystick, and the problem of incorrect guidance immediately fell to only 5%.

By March 1959, thirty-five missiles had been fired in tests. By this time, US interest in replacing their SS.10 missiles was becoming serious, and the US Army intended to make a decision in early 1959. To meet the requirement, Vickers scheduled a series of twenty launches at Weybridge between 9 and 20 March 1959 that would be followed by another five at Fort Benning. It later became obvious that the test equipment at Benning was not really suitable for the tests, so a series of twenty-seven tests was carried out at Redstone Arsenal instead. Testing at Redstone noted that the flare was too difficult to see at long range in bright sunlight, (Note: A problem not noticed in the UK.) and a more powerful model was developed.

=== Official disinterest ===
While testing in the US was leading to a possible order, the British Army proved not only uninterested, but in some ways, actively hostile. In a 1959 memo, it was stated that "We would not be justified in encouraging the Company to maintain their guided weapon design capacity" and while any number of studies included Vigilant in their discussions, there remained no official plan to buy a light anti-armour weapon of any sort.

This discouragement was due to the ongoing changes to the industry in the aftermath of the 1957 Defence White Paper. Duncan Sandys strongly suggested that future orders for weapons would only be given to larger companies, forcing the merger of smaller firms. Among these was the merger of English Electric and Vickers that would form the nucleus of British Aircraft Corporation (BAC), later adding Bristol Aeroplane Company and Hunting Aircraft. EE and Bristol already had their own successful missile design teams, and the government felt there would be no need for a third. Any encouragement to Vickers at this point was seen as a problem if that team would later be broken up and merged into the other two.

To break the logjam, Vickers arranged a 29 September demonstration of the system with 200 officials invited to attend. Eleven missiles were fired for seven hits. It was only at this point that the lingering problems with the wires breaking were clearly on the way to being fully solved, and changes to the simulator system and training regimen were paying off with the average miss from the aim point of only 1 foot (0.30 m).

The demonstration was a success in terms of starting some official consideration of supporting the project. After discussion of purchasing a dozen missiles, later enlarged to two dozen, an 11 January 1960 minute encourages this and compares Vigilant to the French SS.10, SS.11, ENTAC and German-Swiss Cobra, with the Vigilant being highly competitive with all of these. A 22 April memo represents a setback, reiterating the original concerns, followed by a 28 April memo suggesting the Army had not yet decided whether a soldier could effectively operate the system.

By this time, the formation of BAC was well underway. On 30 May, the new director of BAC's guided missile programs wrote the War Office and flatly stated that the company would be keeping the Weybridge office open. The memos continued to fly and it was not until 4 August that the War Office finally conceded the point and decided to offer small contracts to keep the effort going. The news was made public on 26 August, the newspapers noted the company has spent nearly £1 million on development and the projected price was only nearly £500 per unit.

=== Intro production ===
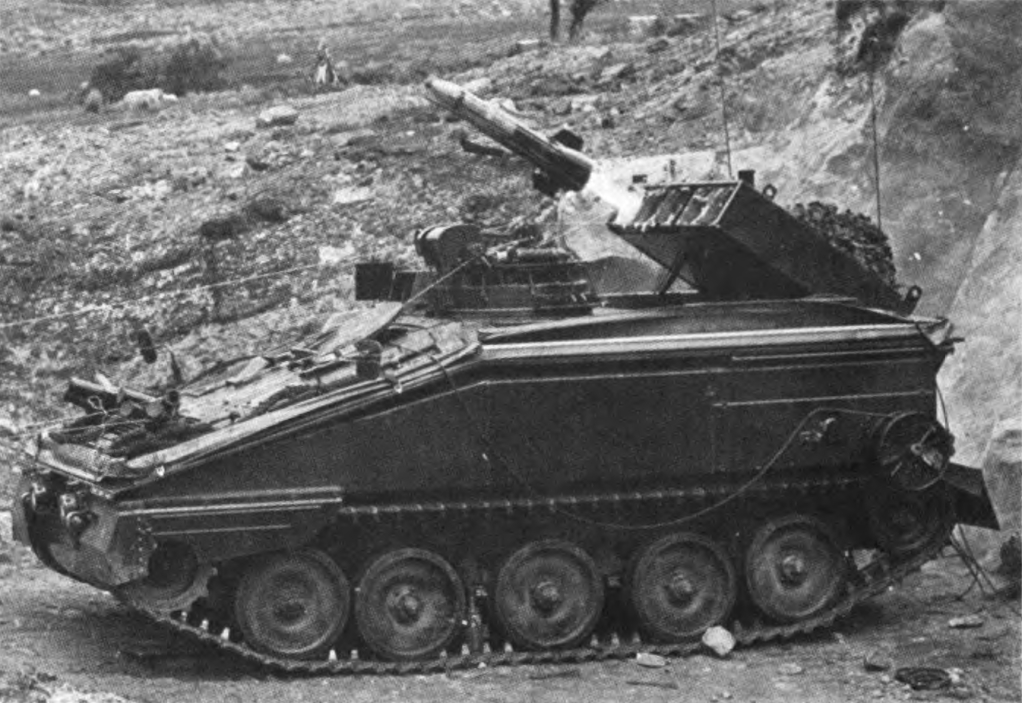
Swingfire used thrust vectoring for control, eliminating the control surfaces and reducing the size of the wings. Its ability to fire around corners was a key feature, allowing the launcher to remain undercover. It was never successfully scaled down to Vigilant size.

The Army had long expressed its concerns about the capabilities of the CML warhead against main battle tanks and both the Army and Ministry continued to consider the system in a negative light. By 1960, the Swingfire program was in its initial stages, and was already considered the ultimate anti-tank weapon. Swingfire aimed to address any shortfall in performance with a much more powerful warhead. The planned future development of a scaled-down version, "medium-range Swingfire", was intended to be a more portable version that would fill the same role as Vigilant.

At almost the same time, the Army Council noted that there was a need for new anti-tank weapons for use by the British Army of the Rhine and forces in the Middle East. In particular, they suggested there was an immediate need for an anti-tank armed version of the Ferret armoured car to serve these roles. While medium-range Swingfire could fill this role, the original Swingfire was not expected until 1966, and the medium-range version sometime after that. They compared ENTAC and Vigilant to arm Ferret and concluded Vigilant was markedly superior to ENTAC due to its guidance system. On 7 November, a contract was offered to fill the "firm and urgent requirement" for the Ferret. This led to an order for seventy additional missiles for tests starting 1961.

The matter of a wider purchase remained open and it was not until 24 November 1961 that clear signals from the Ministry of Aviation suggested they were going to fund production. BAC quickly issued a press release, which almost immediately led to several additional orders from foreign users. By this time the merger of Vickers into BAC was starting in earnest, and through the early part of 1962 the Weybridge design office closed with most members moving to Stevenage.

=== New warhead ===
As the Vigilant pushed through development and an order seemed forthcoming, in May 1962 the Army began development of a new warhead at RARDE that significantly improved penetration. This was effected primarily by moving the contact fuse to the end of a "probe" that extended forward from the front of the missile after launch, providing more stand-off distance in which an improved metal jet could form. Similar concepts are used by a number of anti-tank weapons to this day. (Note: Examples include TOW-2, among others.) Penetration figures for the British-designed warhead are not known, it was never released for export and only the CML versions were sold abroad.

In testing, British Aerospace found the CML warhead was able to penetrate 17 inches (430 mm) of typical single-layer tank armour. It also proved capable of penetrating spaced armor consisting of a 50 millimetres (2.0 in) plate, a 150 millimetres (5.9 in) gap, and another 100 millimetres (3.9 in) plate. These sorts of armor thicknesses were much in advance of most tanks on the battlefield, which at that time were generally much thinner; even the T-72 of a decade later had maximum armor in the turret front of 280 mm.

As well as infantry use, Vigilant could be mounted on vehicles such as the Ferret and Land Rovers. For airborne troops, a lighter polystyrene foam container was developed as well.

== Description ==
=== Missile ===
The missile itself is 42.5 inches (1,080 mm) long, divided into two roughly equal length parts. The front half contains the warhead and its nose probe trigger, and the gyroscopes directly behind the warhead. The rear half holds the rocket motor and control system. The warhead is slightly wider in radius than the rear half of the missile, giving the system an overall layout similar to the RPG-7. Four rectangular narrow-chord wings run from just behind the warhead area to just in front of the extreme rear. Each fibreglass wing carries a control fin at its rear edge. The diameter of the rear section defined by the wings is somewhat larger than the warhead section. The fins were powered by hot gas tapped from the rocket engine.

The control system gyroscopes are placed in front of the rocket engine, just behind the warhead. The transistorized electronics are packaged into two small "fairings" placed between the wings, one for azimuth and one for altitude. These are slightly longer than the wings and serve double duty in connecting the control signals from the wires at the rear of the missile to the guidance system and gyroscopes. The rocket motor lies near the front of the wings, such that the center of gravity does not change much as the fuel burns off. It consists of a "two stage" system with 2.5 seconds of fast-burning fuel at the rear to boost it to speed, and 10 seconds of slower-burning fuel in front as a sustainer.

At the extreme rear of the missile is a canister containing the outlet pipe for the rocket in the center, with a molybdenum nozzle, and a magnesium flare wrapped around it. An igniter was inserted into the center pipe and ignited both on launch. The control wires were wrapped around the can containing the flare.

The missile reaches its maximum range of 1,375 meters in 12.5 seconds. In testing, the missile's shaped charge warhead penetrated a maximum of 576 millimeters of armour of 30 to 35 HRC. Two type of warheads were provided for the Vigilant: a British developed warhead with a collapsible probe that extends on launch which can achieve maximum penetration, and one developed by Swiss firm CML with a blunter nose which has a hardened steel ring which, on oblique strikes, will dig into the armor and swing the shape charge warhead around for better penetration.

=== System setup ===
The missile system could be deployed in a number of configurations. The man-portable configuration consists of a launcher which doubles up as a transport container, a combined sight and controller, a battery and a 63 meter long cable. An optional Missile Selector Box allowed up to 6 missiles to be controlled by, and widely separated from, a single sight controller.

The launcher box is placed on the ground facing the direction of expected targets, and latches on the front and rear of the box are opened. The front cap is rotated downward on a hinge to form a footpad that raises the front of the missile into the air so that it has an initial upward velocity on launch, thereby clearing any local obstructions. The rear cap is removed entirely, it contains the spool holding the cable that attaches to the sighting system or selector box.

=== Guidance and control ===
The sight controller is a pistol grip design, with two grips. The front grip has the launch trigger, and the rear grip has a thumb joystick for steering the missile. A low-magnification (3.2x) monocular forms the sight itself. Engraved stadia lines allow simple ranging, based on a typical tank target bridging the lines once in range. There is a short delay after pulling the trigger while the gyroscopes are spun up, and then the missile launches at an angle of about 20 degrees above horizontal. After the booster burns out the missile reaches a speed where the control fins become effective, and the missile levels out several meters above the ground and begins the guided stage. The missile performs a slow roll as it flies, the roll is first imparted by the force of the wire unwinding from the spool, and later maintained by the control surfaces.

Key to the design was its "velocity control" guidance system. The gyroscopes kept the missile flying level and directly away from the launcher. Control inputs cause the missile to begin flying in the indicated direction, but when the control is released, the autopilot applies the opposite control so that the missile is once again flying directly away from the launcher. This means the operator simply has to adjust the missile until it is seen overlapping the target and then release the control input, at which point it will be flying directly at the target. After that, only minor adjustments are needed to account for accuracy and target motion. Additionally, the gyroscopes automatically correct for any wind buffeting. Vigilant gained a reputation for ease of control and high success with minimal operator training.

== Operators ==
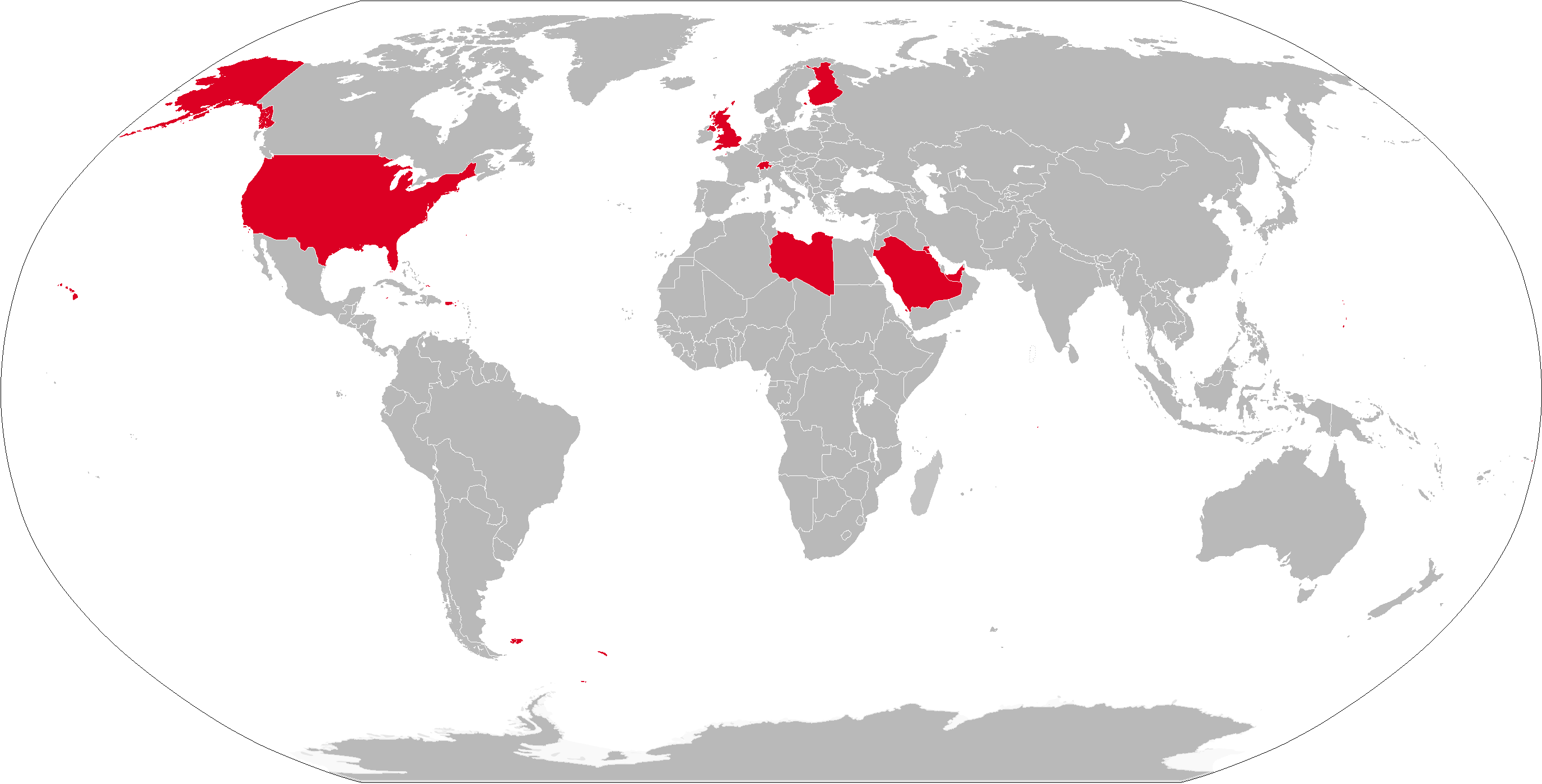
Former Vigilant operators in red

=== Former operators ===
- United Arab Emirates:
  - Abu Dhabi Defence Forces
  - United Arab Emirates Army
- Finland: Finnish Army
- Kuwait: Kuwait Army
- Libya
- Saudi Arabia: Royal Saudi Land Forces
- Switzerland
- United Kingdom: British Army
- United States
