= J-201 =

J-201/202 anti-tank guided missile
- Type: anti-tank guided missile
- Place of origin: People's Republic of China

Service history
- In service: 1973 to 1979
- Used by: China

Production history
- Manufacturer: 1st Research Institute of the Artillery Technology Academy
- Produced: 1973 to late 1970s

Specifications
- Mass: ≈10 kg
- Length: ≈1 meter
- Diameter: ≈100 mm
- Detonation mechanism: Impact
- Engine: rocket motor
- Propellant: solid
- Operational range: 400 to 2,000 meter
- Maximum speed: 285 meter / second
- Guidance system: MCLOS
- Launch platform: ground based

J-201 missile, and its predecessor (265-I missile) and successor (J-202 missile) are members of a family of anti-tank guided missile (ATGM) developed by the People's Republic of China. This is the first family of ATGM in Chinese service, and also the first indigenously developed Chinese ATGM.

== 265-I ==
Many missiles have been introduced to Chinese service from the USSR during the honeymoon between the two countries in the 1950s, but ATGMs were not among them, because it was not considered a top priority in comparison to other missiles. It was not until July, 1958, when China formally begun the development of its first ATGM by preparing the basic infrastructures needed. However, the relationship between China and the USSR had already begun to deteriorate, and Soviet advisors were soon withdrawn from China before it could obtain any information on ATGMs. However, the desperately needed technical info was filled by an unexpected source.

China had backed leftist guerrillas during the independent movements in third world countries. In these armed struggles, captured samples of French-made Nord SS.10 were sent to China for study. Although none of the samples were complete (and all of them were too fragmented to be put back together to form a single completed unit), they were enough to provide a general knowledge for the Chinese to have a basic understanding of how ATGMs work, their design principles, and the basic elements for reverse engineering.

Beijing Industrial Academy, the predecessor of Beijing Institute of Technology, was tasked as the contractor to develop an ATGM based on Nord SS.10, and the 724th Factory was tasked as the subcontractor for production. After two successful test flights, the missile was rushed into very limited service for evaluations, and it was designated as 265-I, named after the project number / code. However, the result was less than satisfactory from feedbacks, because like Nord SS.10 it is based on, 265-I ATGM is a vehicle mounted ATGM and could not carried by infantry. Chinese army was still mostly consisted foot soldiers because China could not field large numbers of vehicles like western countries at the time, and a man-portable ATGM was needed. As a result, 265-I ATGM never entered mass production like other Chinese missiles.

According to Chinese, the importance of 265-I ATGM is that it paved the way for future Chinese ATGM development by laying the foundation for the future. From the experienced gained from the 265-I program, Chinese government ordered the formation of dedicated ATGM development establishment, consisted of the newly formed 1st Research Institute of the Artillery Technology Academy, Beijing Industrial Academy and the 724th Factory.

In 1962, Chinese government gave an order to develop a new ATGM. Lu Weiru (卢伟如), the head of the newly formed 1st Research Institute of the Artillery Technology Academy was designated as the program manager, and a year later, he was joined by Wang Xingzhi (王兴治), a 1963 graduate of the Military Engineering Academy, who immediately became the chief designer of ATGM, as well as future Chinese ATGMs. The new ATGM to be developed was designated as J-201. One of the difficulties the developer faced was that the 265-I ATGM did not meet the requirements of the Chinese military, but it was the only source of information and experience China had, and although something new was needed, there was not any new source to turn to.

The developer of Chinese ATGM would soon obtain a boost from returning trainees it had sent abroad earlier. Cao Gangchuan, the future top commander of the People's Liberation Army and his colleagues had returned to China at the time, after graduating from Military Engineering School of the Artillery Corps of the USSR, and they had brought the operational and training manuals of Soviet AT-1 ATGM with them. These manuals became valuable reference for the developers, but the AT-1 design was not directly copied, because like Nord SS.10 and its Chinese development, 265-I, it is also a vehicle-launched ATGM. However, most of the information gained from AT-1 was incorporated into J-201.

The most important source of information for J-201, was from western Cobra anti-tank missile. Sometimes after obtaining manuals of AT-1 ATGM, China had also managed to obtain the logistic manuals of Cobra ATGM issued by West Germany, which provided much more detailed information on the missile, so detail that information revealed in these manuals were enough to provide basic frame of reverse engineering. As a result, the Chinese J-201 ATGM appears identical to Cobra ATGM, with similar performance as well. How exactly China obtained these West German logistic manuals for Cobra ATGM remains a closely guarded secret to this day.

Seven years after the program begun, J-201 completed trials in 1969, and received state certification next year. Due to the political turmoil in China, namely, the Cultural Revolution, series production on small scale did not begin until January, 1973, almost two years after certification. The missile entered very limited Chinese service for evaluation purposes, and based on the feedback from the field, improvement work on the missile began immediately.

== J-202 ==
J-202 ATGM is the improvement of earlier J-201 ATM. In comparison to Cobra ATGM, the maximum range is increased by a quarter to 2 km from the original 1.6 km of Cobra ATGM. However, the minimum range is also doubled, from the original 200 meters of Cobra ATM to 400 meter for J-202. The guidance remained to be MCLOS and the ATGM can pierce armor plates up to 120 mm thick when impacting at a 65 degrees angle. In 1978, the J-201/202 ATGM had won a reward in the Chinese National Science and Technology Conference.

During its brief service, J-202 had experienced a grave mishap that almost ended in disaster. The missile was scheduled to have a demonstration in 1977, and on August 17, August 18, and September 15, the missile performed well in these separate occasions, scoring an impressive 15 out 21 hits against both mobile and fixed target 1.4 km away. The round failed to score direct hits were all near misses and the demonstration appeared to be going well. However, for the last extra round to be added at the very last moment, something went terribly wrong. This last round hit ground and then bounded up, turning 180 degrees, flew directly toward the launchers where it was originally fired. Though the missile eventually failed to detonate and dropped to the ground before reaching the launcher, everyone at the scene was surely spooked.

Like its predecessor J-201 ATGM, J-202 ATGM did not enter mass production either, and only saw very limited service with Chinese military. The main disadvantage of J-201/202 included that the wings cannot be folded, so the container was bulky and clumsy to carry, despite the ATGM itself being intended for infantry use. Furthermore, in comparison to later Chinese ATGM, namely, HJ-73, the effective range of the J-201/202 is shorter than the latter. Therefore, after the successful development of HJ-73, the small-scale production of J-201/202 ATM stopped and it is believed that all of 265-I, J-201 and J-202 ATMs in the inventory were exhausted in trainings. 265-I, J-201/202 ATMs are not known to be exported by China.

== Operator ==
- China: People's Liberation Army
  - People's Liberation Army Ground Force
