= Ruhrstahl X-7 =

Wire-guided anti-tank missile

Ruhrstahl X-7 "Rotkäppchen"
- Type: Anti-tank guided missile
- Place of origin: Nazi Germany

Service history
- In service: Not operational
- Wars: World War II

Production history
- Manufacturer: Ruhrstahl AG
- Developed from: Ruhrstahl X-4

Specifications
- Engine: diglycol dinitrate powder

The Ruhrstahl X-7 "Rotkäppchen" (German: Rotkäppchen, lit. 'Little Red Riding Hood') also known as Kramer X-7 or Ruhrstahl-Kramer RK 347 was a German wire-guided anti-tank guided missile with a manual control system (now referred to as MCLOS) developed during World War II by Ruhrstahl AG in 1943, after the Waffenamt (Army Ordnance Board) placed an urgent order for anti-tank missiles, this project was under the leadership of Dipl.-Ing. Max Otto Kramer. It was essentially a smaller version of the X-4, but was powered by solid-propellant rocket.

== History ==
Since the German anti-tank weapons such as the Panzerfaust and the Panzerschreck were only effective at very short distances, the search was for a weapon that was also effective at longer distances to destroy armored vehicles. In 1943, the Ruhrstahl company received the order from the Waffenamt to develop the X-7. Ruhrstahl's development was based heavily on the Ruhrstahl X-4 air-to-air missile, which had already been successfully tested at the time.

The X-7 was powered by two solid-propellant rocket, with the first stage producing 68 kp of thrust, launching the rocket and bringing it to speed. The second stage produced a continuous thrust of 5.5 kp over eight seconds and was intended to bring the missile with the 2.5 kg hollow charge to the target. The maximum range of the X-7 was approximately 1,200 m. On September 21, 1944, seven X-7s were launched for test purposes at the Sennelager Training Area. The testing was to be completed in 1945 and mass production was planned at Ruhrstahl in the Brackwede plant and in the Neubrandenburg Mechanical Works. A few hundred X-7s were produced, most of which were used for testing. A few examples may have been used on the Eastern Front in the last months of the war in 1945. The X-7 pioneered the further development of anti-tank guided weapons after World War II.

France produced a further developed and improved version of the X-7 in 1955 with the SS.10, the development of which in turn significantly influenced the following and better-known SS.11.

== Specification ==
- Primary function: anti-tank guided missile
- Powerplant: 2× WASAG 109-506 solid rocket motor
- Length: 950 mm (3 ft 1 in)
- Diameter: 150 mm (5.9 in)
- Wingspan: 600 mm (24 in)
- Weight: 10 kg (22 lb)
- Speed: 100 m/s (220 mph; 190 kn; 360 km/h)
- Warhead: 2.5 kg (5.5 lb) hollow charge
  - Penetration: over 200 mm (7.9 in) at 30°
- Range: 1,000 m (1,100 yd)
- Fuzes: impact (?)
- Guidance system: MCLOS visual guidance with wire control
- Unit cost:
- Date deployed: never

== Bibliography ==
- Roger Ford: Germany's Secret Weapons of World War II. Nebula, ISBN 3-89555-087-6.
- Josef Stemmer: Raketenantriebe (Rocket engines). Swiss printing and publishing house AG. Zurich, 1952.
