= Royal Ordnance Rocket Motors =

Royal Ordnance Rocket Motors was a former division of Royal Ordnance, previously ICI, in Worcestershire that made small rocket motors for missiles.

== History ==
=== Imperial Chemical Industries ===
The site was set up in 1951 for ICI by Sir St John Elstub CBE; he had been a bomber pilot in the Second World War, being knighted in the 1970 Birthday Honours.

The site made cast doublebase solid propellant rocket motors.

=== Imperial Metal Industries ===
The site was later run by Imperial Metal Industries (IMI), on behalf of the Ministry of Technology. The 200-acre site was later owned by the Ministry of Defence. It was a high-security site; local firemen had been prevented from attending incidents at the site.

=== 1980 explosion ===
On 4 March 1980 there was an explosion at the Worcestershire site, that severely damaged local houses, making them uninhabitable. The body of one of the dead workers was thrown 40 metres from the blast, landing in the garden of one of the damaged houses. It was the first accident in 28 years of the site.

=== Royal Ordnance ===
By the 1980s, Royal Ordnance was Europe's largest producer of ammunition.

The Propellants, Explosives and Rocket Motor Establishment, in south-west Essex, was also bought by Royal Ordnance.

=== Roxel ===
The Worcestershire site is now owned by Roxel Group, an Anglo-French company, and a main employer in Worcestershire.

== Structure ==
It was at a site in Worcestershire. In the 1980s the site had around 600 workers, with around 560 in the 1990s. Rocket propellants were tested nearby.

== Products ==
Missiles that it made rocket motors for include

- Multiple Launch Rocket System (MLRS)
- SeaCat
- Swingfire
- Vickers Vigilant

The site also made solid-propellant rockets for satellites.

== See also ==
- British Aerospace
