= Cobra (missile) =

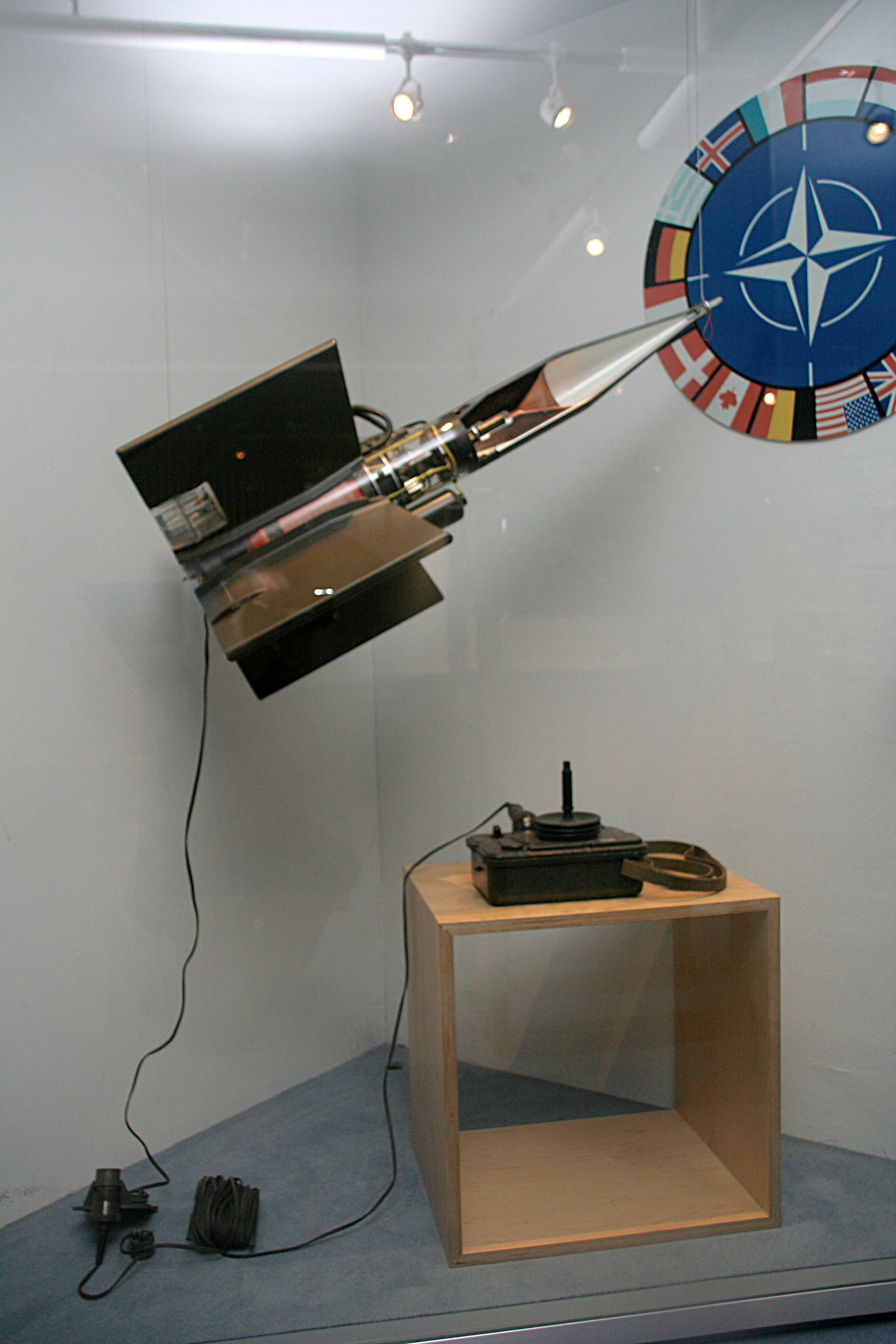
- Cobra missile
- Type: Anti-tank missile
- Place of origin: Switzerland; West Germany

Service history
- In service: 1957 - 1968 (Cobra)
- Used by: See Service History
- Wars: Six-Day War; Indo-Pakistani War of 1971; Syrian Civil War

Production history
- Designer: Contraves, Oerlikon and Bölkow
- Designed: 1954
- No. built: ~170,000
- Variants: Cobra 2000, Mamba

Specifications
- Mass: 10 kg (Cobra); 10.3 kg (Cobra 2000); 11.2 kg (Mamba)
- Length: 950 mm (Cobra); 952 mm (Cobra 2000); 995 mm (Mamba)
- Diameter: 100 mm (Cobra, Cobra 2000); 120 mm (Mamba)
- Effective firing range: 200 m to 1,600 m (Cobra); 400 m to 2,000 m (Cobra 2000); 300 m to 2,000 m (Mamba)
- Detonation mechanism: 2.7 kg warhead (Cobra); HEAT (475 mm versus RHA) or HEAT-fragmentation (350 mm versus RHA) - (Cobra 2000); 2.5 kg HEAT or HEAT-fragmentation (Mamba)
- Maximum speed: 300 km/h (Cobra 2000); 500 km/h
- Guidance system: MCLOS system

The Cobra was a Swiss/West German anti-tank missile designed by the Oerlikon-Contraves and Bölkow GmbH companies. It entered service with the German Army in the late 1950s. It was followed by the Cobra 2000 and Mamba missile systems, which were upgrades that improved the guidance system and performance of the missile. The missile had limited distribution in the United States by Daystrom Inc., a licensed U.S. distributor, chiefly for evaluation purposes (U.S. Marines were interested and evaluated the missile for purchase.)

== Description ==
The Cobra has a cruciform arrangement of four large forward swept wings. The main body is a long cylinder, with an underslung launch booster. Each of the wings has a spoiler on the rear edge which is used to steer the missile. The warhead is at the front of the missile, behind which is the gyro and guidance circuitry which allows the missile to interpret steering instructions from the operator. Behind the guidance mechanism is the sustainer motor, around which is wrapped the guidance wire which pays out behind the missile.

The missile is normally deployed with a single operator controlling and control box linked to up to eight missiles, which can be deployed up to twenty meters away from the operator. On launch the booster fires, projecting the missile up into the air at an angle of 20 degrees. The operator then steers the missile towards the target along his line of sight using a joystick on the control box.

== Development ==
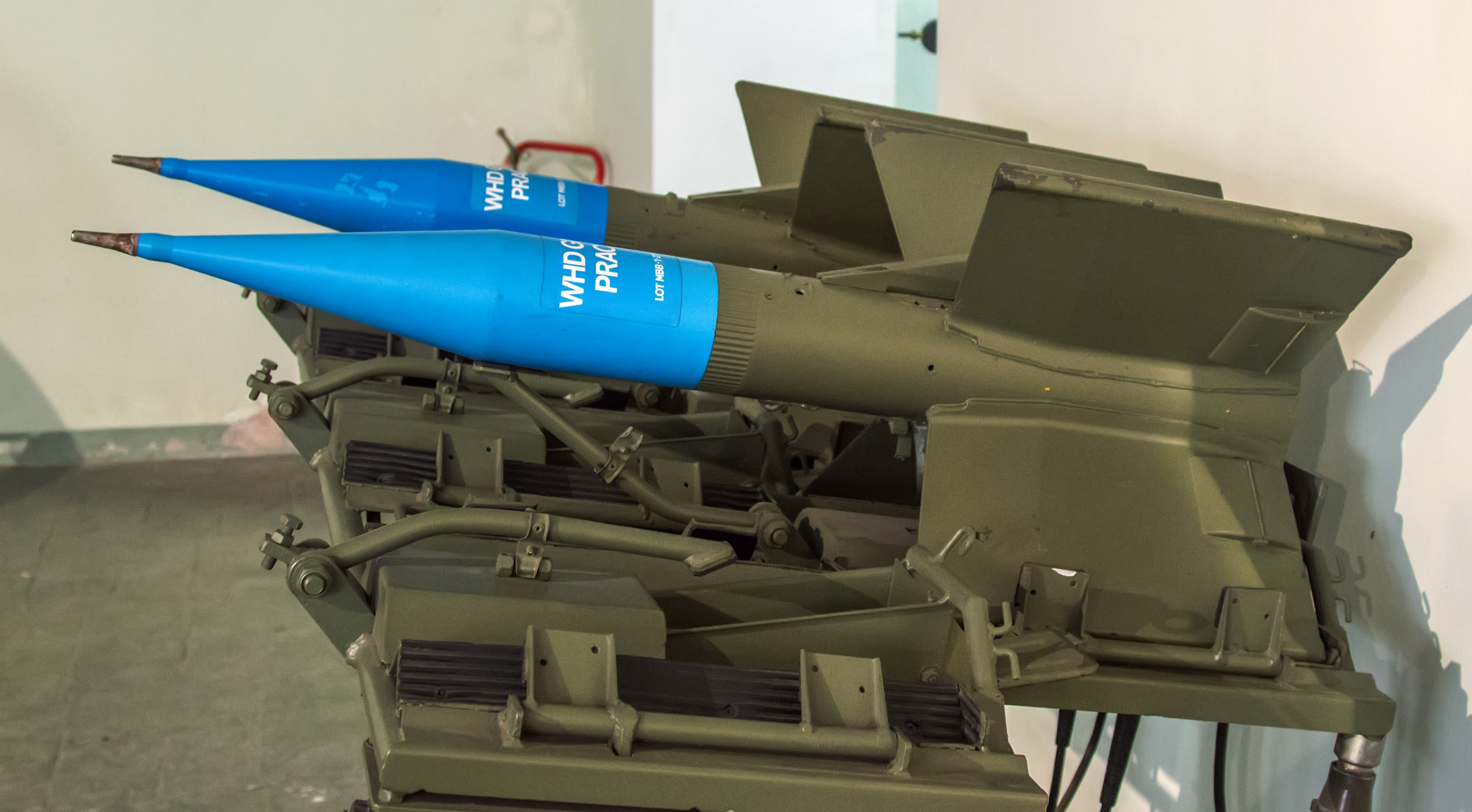
The Cobra was typical of 1950s anti-tank missile designs, with very large wings and spoilers for control.

Development of the system began in 1954 as a collaboration between Contraves, Oerlikon and Bölkow. The initials of these companies and the German word for rocket (Rakete) gave the project its name: COBRA. The first successful tests were conducted in 1956, with the West German government placing an initial order for 2,000 missiles in January 1957.

Production of the original missile ended in 1968, with a new version, the Cobra 2000 entering service. The Cobra 2000 extended the range of the missile to 2,000 meters and could be fitted with either an anti-tank warhead or a dual purpose anti-tank/fragmentation warhead.

The Mamba was introduced in 1972 and improved the guidance system, and added a dual thrust motor with an initial low power launch mode, followed by a higher powered sustainer which allows the missile to be gathered more easily during the initial seconds of flight. Initial launch speed is just 35 meters per second, after the sustainer is engaged this increases to 140 meters per second. The missile travels faster, reducing the time of flight to its maximum range in just 17.5 seconds. Also the operator is provided with a x7 power telescope.

== Operational history ==
The weapon was widely used by NATO and allied forces most notably West Germany and Pakistan. It was exported to Argentina, Brazil, Chile (Mamba), Denmark, Greece, Israel, India, Pakistan, Spain and Turkey. Approximately 170,000 of the missiles were produced.

The Pakistani Army was the first to use the Cobra missiles in combat during the Indo-Pakistani War of 1965 at the Battle of Chawinda; Cobra missiles assisted C squadron of Pakistan's 25th Cavalry brigade in repulsing an attack by the Centurion tanks of the Poona Horse. A Cobra missile also reportedly caused the tank of a squadron commander Major Bhupinder Singh to burst into flames.

== Operators ==
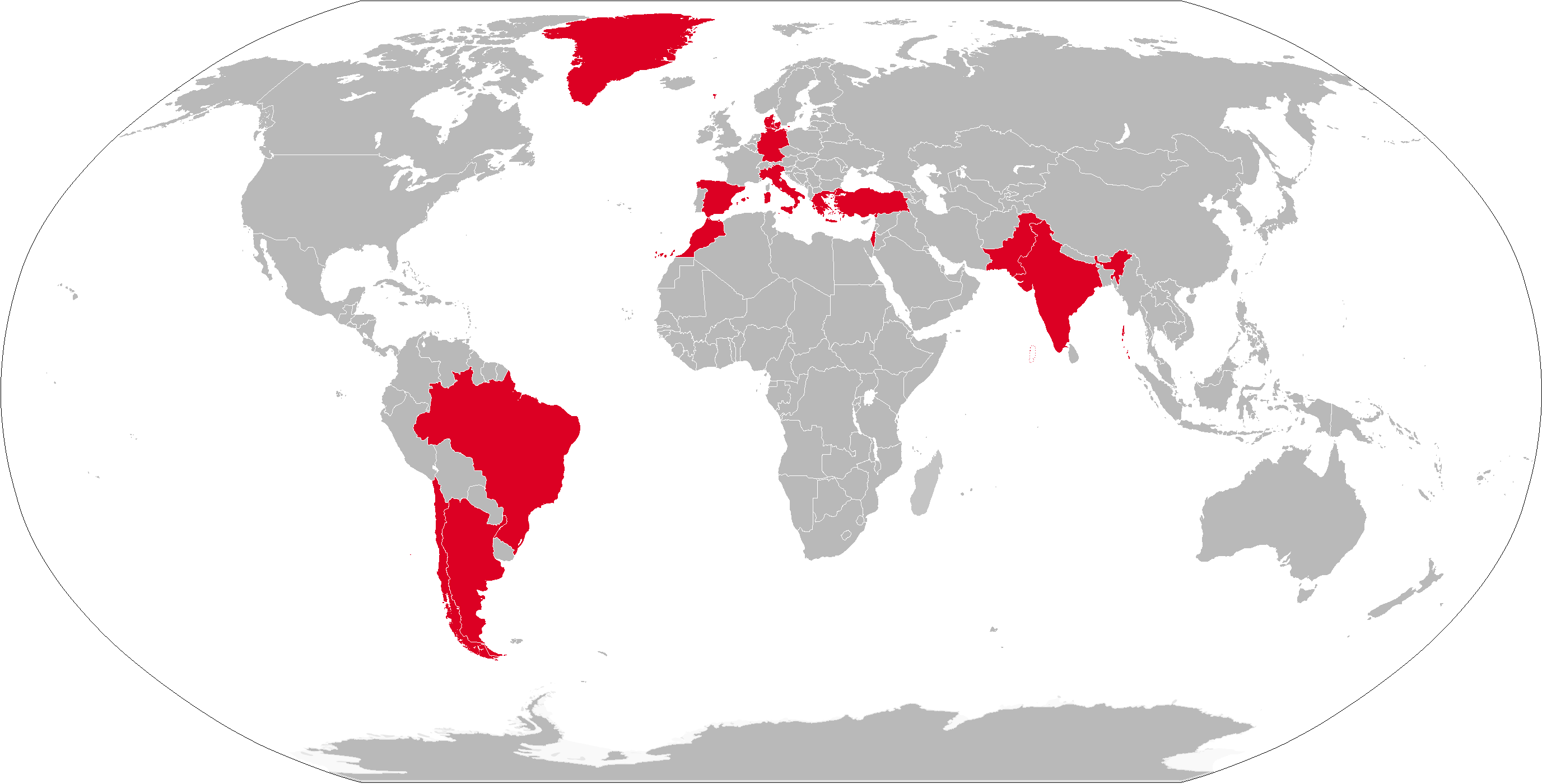
Map with former Cobra operators in red

=== Former operators ===
Argentina
Brazil
Chile
Denmark
Germany
Greece
Israel
Italy
India
Morocco
Pakistan
Spain
Turkey

== See also ==
- Wire-guided missile
- 9M14 Malyutka – (Soviet Union)
- Type 64 MAT – (Japan)
- 3M6 Shmel – (Soviet Union)
- SS.10 – (France)
- ENTAC – (France)
- Mathogo – (Argentina)
