= SSM-A-23 Dart =

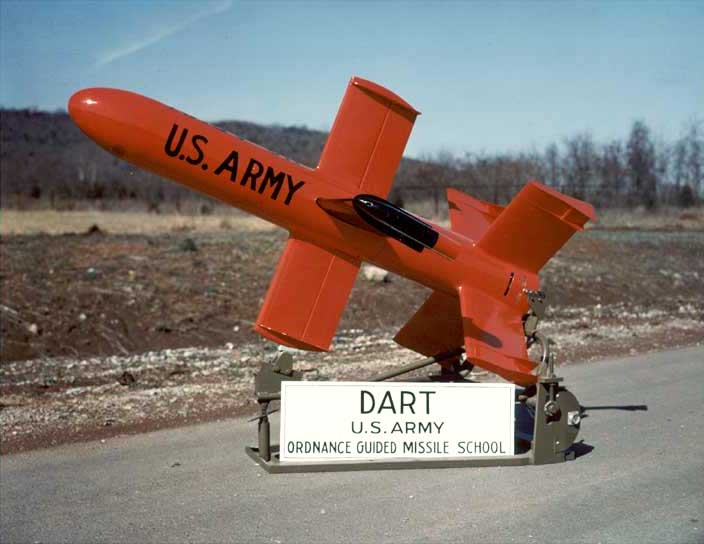
- XSSM-A-23 prototype
- Type: Anti-tank missile
- Place of origin: United States

Service history
- Used by: United States Army

Specifications (XSSM-A-23)
- Mass: 100 lb (45 kg)
- Length: 5 ft (150 cm)
- Diameter: 8 in (200 mm)
- Wingspan: 3 ft 4 in (1.02 m)
- Warhead: Shaped charge
- Engine: Dual-thrust solid-fuel rocket
- Propellant: Solid fuel
- Operational range: 3,333 yd (1.894 mi; 3.048 km)
- Maximum speed: 900 ft/s (610 mph; 990 km/h)
- Guidance system: Manual command to line of sight
- References: Parsch 2003, Jacobs and Whitney 1962

The XSSM-A-23 Dart was an anti-tank-guided missile developed for the United States Army in the 1950s. After protracted development, the missile, similar in design to the French SS.10, was cancelled in favor of purchasing the SS.11 missile.

== Design and development ==
The initial requirement for a guided anti-tank missile, intended for the replacement of recoilless rifles and Bazookas in the role, was issued by the U.S. Army in 1951; that November, the Aerophysics Development Corporation responded with a proposal for a wire-guided missile, similar in concept and configuration to the SS.10 missile being developed in France. After evaluating the SS.10 in 1952–53, the Army issued a contract for the full development of the Aerophysics Development missile, designated SSM-A-23 Dart, in April 1953.

The SSM-A-23 was of conventional configuration for an anti-tank missile of the time, having cruciform wings and stabilizing fins, with spoilerons providing control; a dual-thrust solid-propellant rocket produced by the Grand Central Rocket Company provided thrust. The launcher for the missile was mounted on a variant of the M59 armored personnel carrier designated T149; helicopter launching was also considered as a possibility. Guidance was by manual command to line of sight, the missile operator following a sodium flare in the tail of the missile and guiding the missile to the target with commands sent by a wire that spooled from the missile during flight. Due to difficulties experienced in testing to ensure accuracy, an infrared seeker was proposed for terminal homing. The missile was fitted with a shaped charge warhead intended to defeat the armor of enemy tanks.

During the development of the Dart, Aerophysics Development was acquired by the Studebaker-Packard Corporation, the purchase taking place in December 1954. Curtiss-Wright then acquired the company as part of a larger deal with Studebaker-Packard in August 1956.

== Operational history ==
The first launch trials of the XSSM-A-23 prototype missiles took place in August 1954; over the next year, forty additional tests took place. These proved less than satisfactory; by 1957, the Dart was still not ready for service, and it was believed that Aerophysics Development had overextended itself with technical challenges involved in the missile's development. Accordingly, the program was extended, with some of the Army's requirements being relaxed; however, in September 1958 the program was determined to be too far behind schedule and too far over budget to be successful, and the contract for the Dart was cancelled. The Army adopted the SS.10, designated MGM-21, and the SS.11, designated AGM-22, in its stead. The program had cost $44 million in 1955 dollars.
