= Malkara (missile) =

Australian anti-tank missile (1958–1960s)

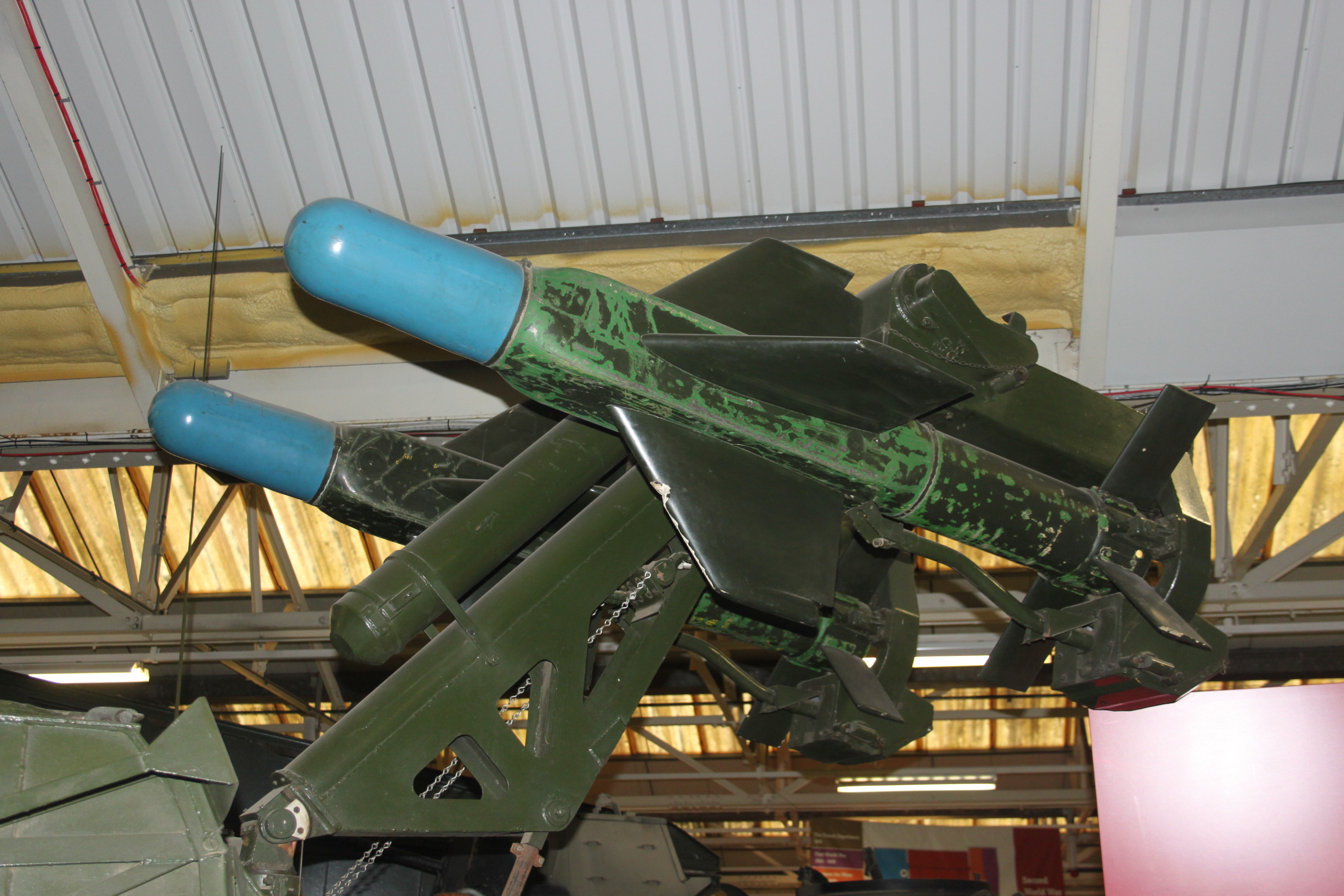
- Malkara on display at the Tank Museum, Bovington
- Type: Anti-tank guided missile
- Place of origin: Australia, United Kingdom

Service history
- In service: 1958 to 1960s
- Used by: United Kingdom

Production history
- Designer: Royal Aircraft Establishment/Aeronautical Research Laboratory
- Designed: 1954
- Manufacturer: Government Aircraft Factories/Fairey Engineering Ltd
- Produced: 1958–1964
- No. built: 1,000
- Variants: none

Specifications
- Mass: 93.5 kg (206 lb)
- Length: 1.9 m (6 ft 3 in)
- Diameter: 203 mm (8.0 in)
- Wingspan: 80 cm (2 ft 7 in)
- Warhead: 26 kg (57 lb) HESH
- Detonation mechanism: impact
- Engine: solid rocket
- Operational range: 4,000 metres (2.5 mi)
- Guidance system: wire guided line of sight
- Steering system: control surfaces
- Launch platform: Vehicle

The Malkara (from an Aboriginal word for "shield") was one of the earliest guided anti-tank missiles (ATGMs). It was jointly developed by Australia and the United Kingdom between 1951 and 1954, and was in service from 1958 until gradually replaced by the Vickers Vigilant missile in the late 1960s. It was intended to be light enough to deploy with airborne forces, yet powerful enough to knock out any tank then in service. The basic form was later adapted for the short-range surface-to-air role as the Seacat and influenced the development of the Ikara.

== Development and operations ==
Design was principally undertaken at the Australian Government Aeronautical Research Laboratory, and this phase was also one of the first examples of computer simulation in engineering design. Development testing was carried out at Woomera Prohibited Area, and approval testing at the tank training range at Lulworth Cove, Dorset. Although testing at Dorset apparently achieved an impressive 90% P_{kill}, in service the missiles were not considered a great success, due to three principal failures:

- They were considered too heavy. As they were too heavy for manpacking, they could only be operated from their specialist vehicles, reducing flexibility.
- Accuracy achieved in practice was poor. This may have been because the awkward control system required a lot of practice. Malkara had a training simulator integrated with the launch interface equipment. In their memoirs, some operators state that they only fired one missile in their careers.
- Finally, their speed was low, taking almost 30 seconds to reach maximum range.

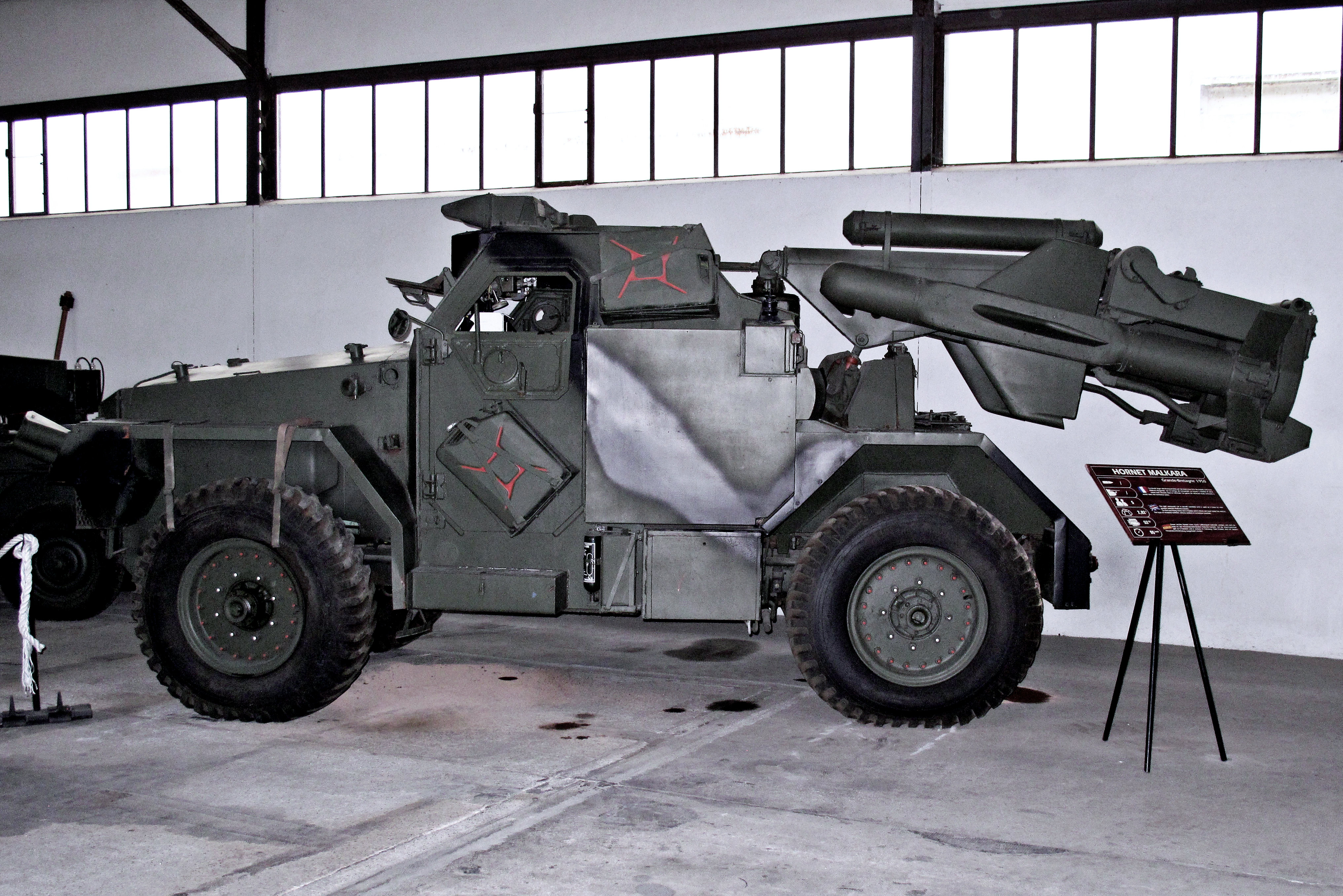
Malkara-equipped Humber Hornet vehicle

However, lessons learned from the Malkara project led to improvements in later programs. In addition, the basic airframe and expertise were directly used in the development of the Ikara anti-submarine missile and the Sea Cat naval surface-to-air missile.

Malkara was unusual among anti-tank missiles in that it had a High-explosive squash head (HESH), also known as High Explosive Plastic (HEP), warhead instead of the more usual shaped charge HEAT (High Explosive Anti Tank) warhead. The United Kingdom always showed interest for HESH, the main explosive-based anti-tank ammunition in British use including contemporary tanks like the Centurion. A 26/27 kg anti-tank warhead was well above the average, but Malkara had a calibre of 203 mm (8.0 in).

== Operators ==
United Kingdom

- British Army

== Specifications ==
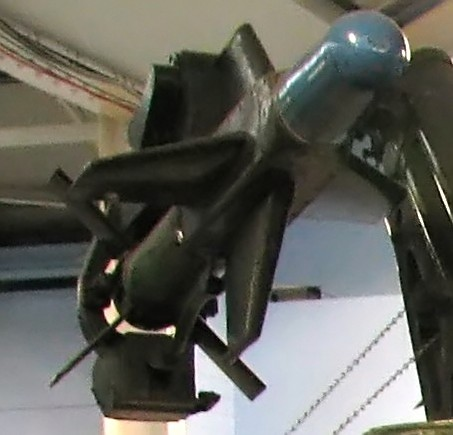

- Length: 1.9 m (6.2 ft)
- Diameter: 200 mm (7.9 in)
- Wingspan: 800 mm (2.6 ft)
- Range: 4,000 m (4,400 yd)
- Propulsion: Dual thrust solid rocket
- Speed: 146.19 m/s (327 mph) - low-subsonic, 28 sec to 4 km max range
- Overall weight: 93.5 kg (206 lb)
- Warhead: 26 kg (57 lb) HESH
- Guidance: Wire guided MCLOS, using a thumb joystick and visual observation of two flares on the wings.
- Number built: 1,000

== See also ==
- Orange William, a UK development for a replacement for Malkara
- Humber Hornet – (United Kingdom, Australia)
- Ruhrstahl X-4 – (Nazi Germany)

== Sources ==
- War Machine encyclopedia, Aerospace Publishing Ltd., pag. 253 (in Italian version printed by De Agostini, 1984).
- Rockets and Missiles - John W. R. Taylor - Hippo Books No 8 - Hamlyn, 1971 - ISBN 0-600-37528-5
