= ENTAC =

French anti-tank missile

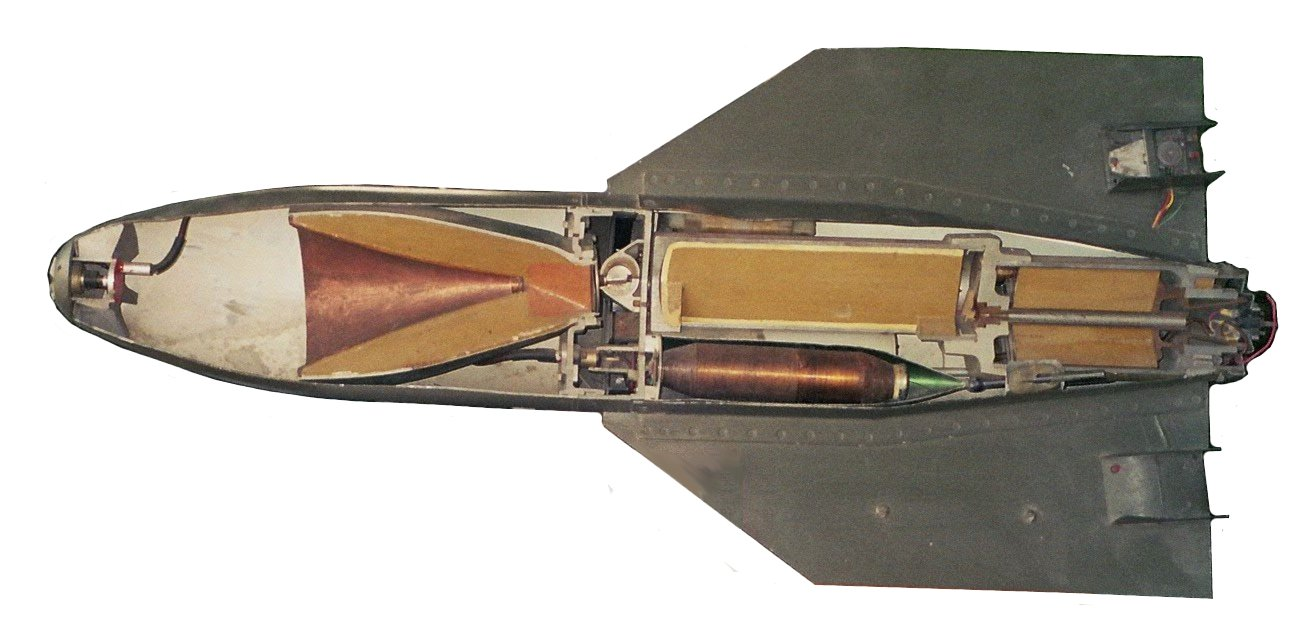
- Cut-away of an early Model 56 ENTAC missile
- Type: Anti-tank missile
- Place of origin: France

Service history
- In service: 1957
- Used by: (see below)

Production history
- Designed: 1950s
- Manufacturer: DTAT & Aerospatiale
- Produced: 1957–1974
- No. built: 140,000

Specifications
- Mass: 12.2 kg
- Length: 820 mm
- Diameter: 152 mm
- Wingspan: 375 mm
- Warhead: 4 kg HE shaped charge capable of piercing 650 mm of steel armor
- Detonation mechanism: nose fuse
- Engine: combination solid booster and sustainer
- Operational range: 400 m - 2 km
- Maximum speed: 100 m/s
- Guidance system: MCLOS wire
- Steering system: trailing edge wing spoilers
- Launch platform: individual

External image
- DTAT/Aerospatiale ENTAC
- Manufacture's Fact Sheet

ENTAC ("Engin Téléguidé Anti-Char") or MGM-32A was a French MCLOS wire-guided anti-tank missile. Developed in the early 1950s, the weapon entered service with the French Army in 1957. Production ended in 1974 after approximately 140,000 had been built.

== Development ==
The missile was developed by the French Government agency - DTAT (Direction Technique des Armements Terrestres) at the same time as the private industry SS.10. Development time for the ENTAC was longer than the SS.10, so it did not enter service until 1957. It proved to be a great improvement over the SS.10, which had entered production five years earlier. Once fully developed and tested, production of the ENTAC was given to the firm of Aerospatiale. The ENTAC was designed to be a man-portable weapon or operated from a small vehicle like the Jeep, replacing the Nord SS.10 in French service.

== Design ==
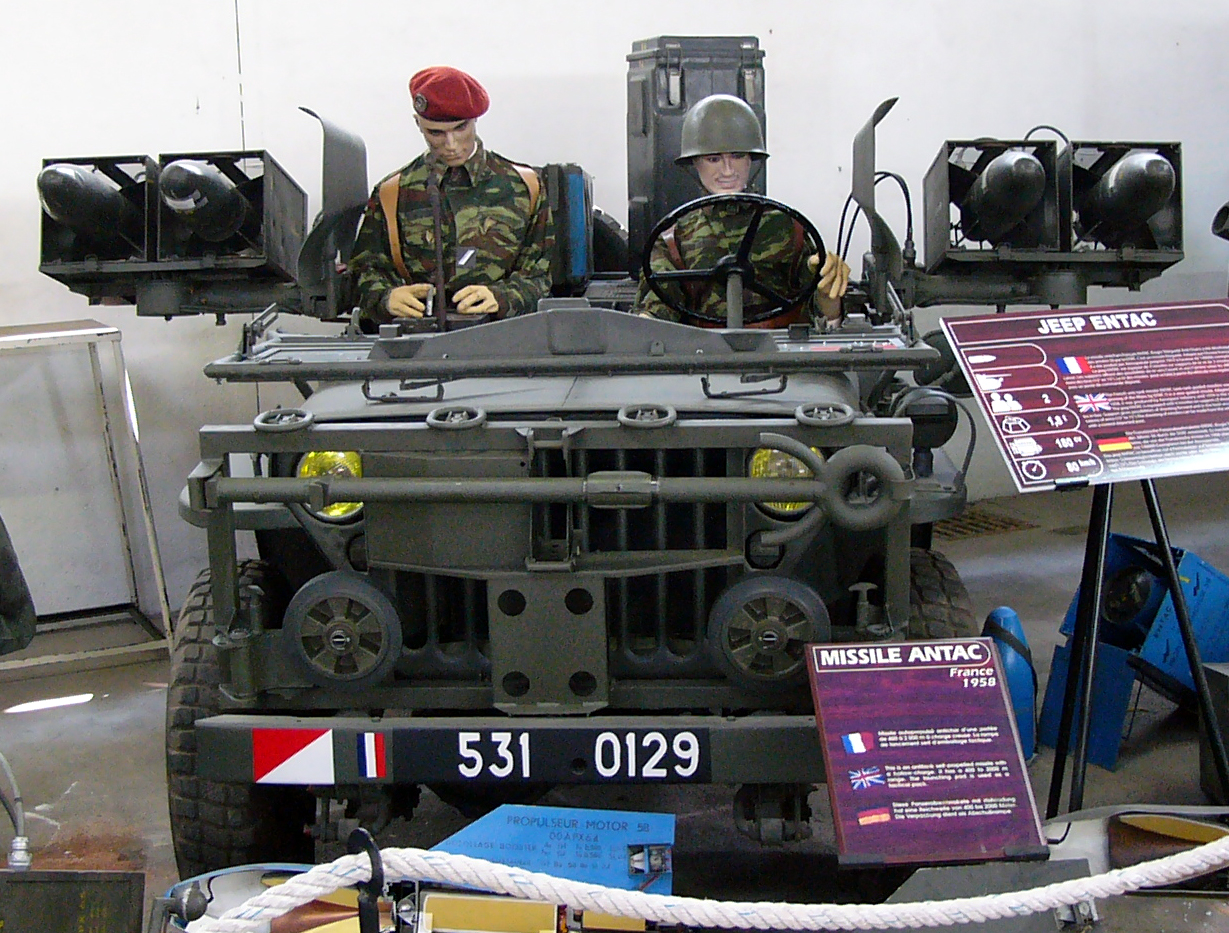
French Hotchkiss M201 with four ENTAC missiles

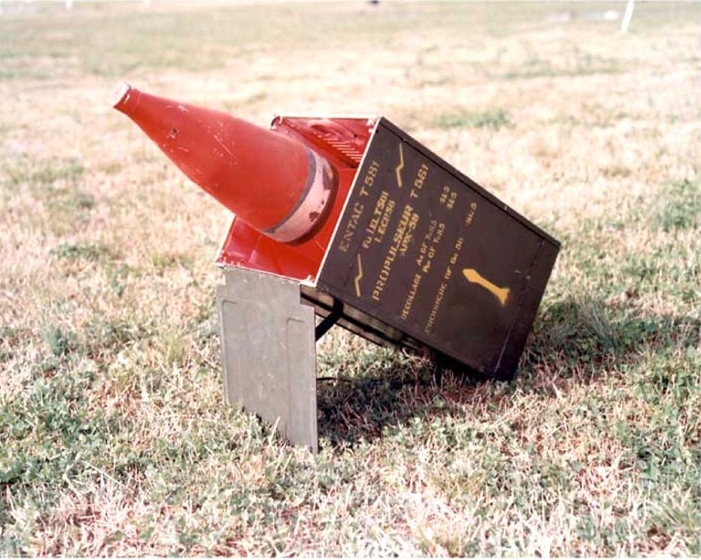
ENTAC Model 58 missile at the US Redstone testing facility on 29 March 1961

The missile is launched from a simple metal box, which is connected to an operator station. An individual operator station can control up to 10 launcher boxes. The operator manually steers the missile by means of a small joystick. These course corrections are transmitted to the missile via a thin set of wires that trail behind the missile - see MCLOS. Like many early ATGMs, the missile had a large minimum range (see 9M14 Malyutka) due to the time it took to get up to flight speed and come under operator control.

== Operational history ==
=== Australia ===
Used from 1964 until 1985.

=== France ===
The missile first entered service in 1957. The ENTAC may have been used by France in small numbers during the 1960s and 1970s on peacekeeping operations.

=== India ===
ENTAC missiles entered service in 1968 after being ordered a year prior. They were used by 12 GUARDS(IND)most effectively against Pakistani tanks during the 1971 war.

=== Iran ===
Ordered in 1966 and delivered from 1966-1969. It remained in service after the 1979 Iranian revolution and was used against Iraqi tanks during the 1980-88 war.

=== Israel ===
Entered service in 1963 after being ordered the year before. It is likely that they were used during the 1967 Six-Day War against Arab tanks.

=== Lebanon ===
Ordered in 1966 and entered service in 1967. These were deployed during the Lebanese Civil War and was used in street fighting, particularly during the early 1980s.

=== South Africa ===
French-made missiles were in the inventory, alongside locally manufactured licence-built missiles. Having acquired some 500 examples by 1969, expeditionary units of the South African Defence Force first deployed ENTACs against People's Armed Forces for the Liberation of Angola (FAPLA) and Cuban military advisers during Operation Savannah. The system was often mounted on unarmoured Land Rovers. South African servicemen destroyed at least one FAPLA mortar position with their missiles in September 1975. Two Angolan T-54/55 tanks were also eliminated by ENTAC crews, working in concert with Eland and Ratel-90 armoured cars, during Operation Askari, 1984.

=== United States ===
The US army purchased the Model 58 ENTAC with an improved warhead to replace the Nord SS.10 (or MGM-21A). It was designed to be an interim weapon, used as the BGM-71 TOW was being developed. The first missiles were deployed in 1963, that year the missile received the US designation MGM-32A. In US service the missile was based on the M151 Jeep and issued to the Anti-tank Platoon of the Heavy Weapons Company. In Korea (7th ID @ 1st CAV) it replaced the Scorpion tracked AT vehicle, a 90MM SP Gun which could not climb the hilly terrain as easily as the Jeep. Using extended cables missiles could be fired from defilade. The missile was phased out between 1968 and 1969, being replaced with the more advanced BGM-71 TOW. It was used in the Vietnam War against fortified infantry positions, but not enemy tanks. It was fired by the 14th Infantry Regiment, amongst others.

== Models ==
- ENTAC / MGM-32A

== Operators ==
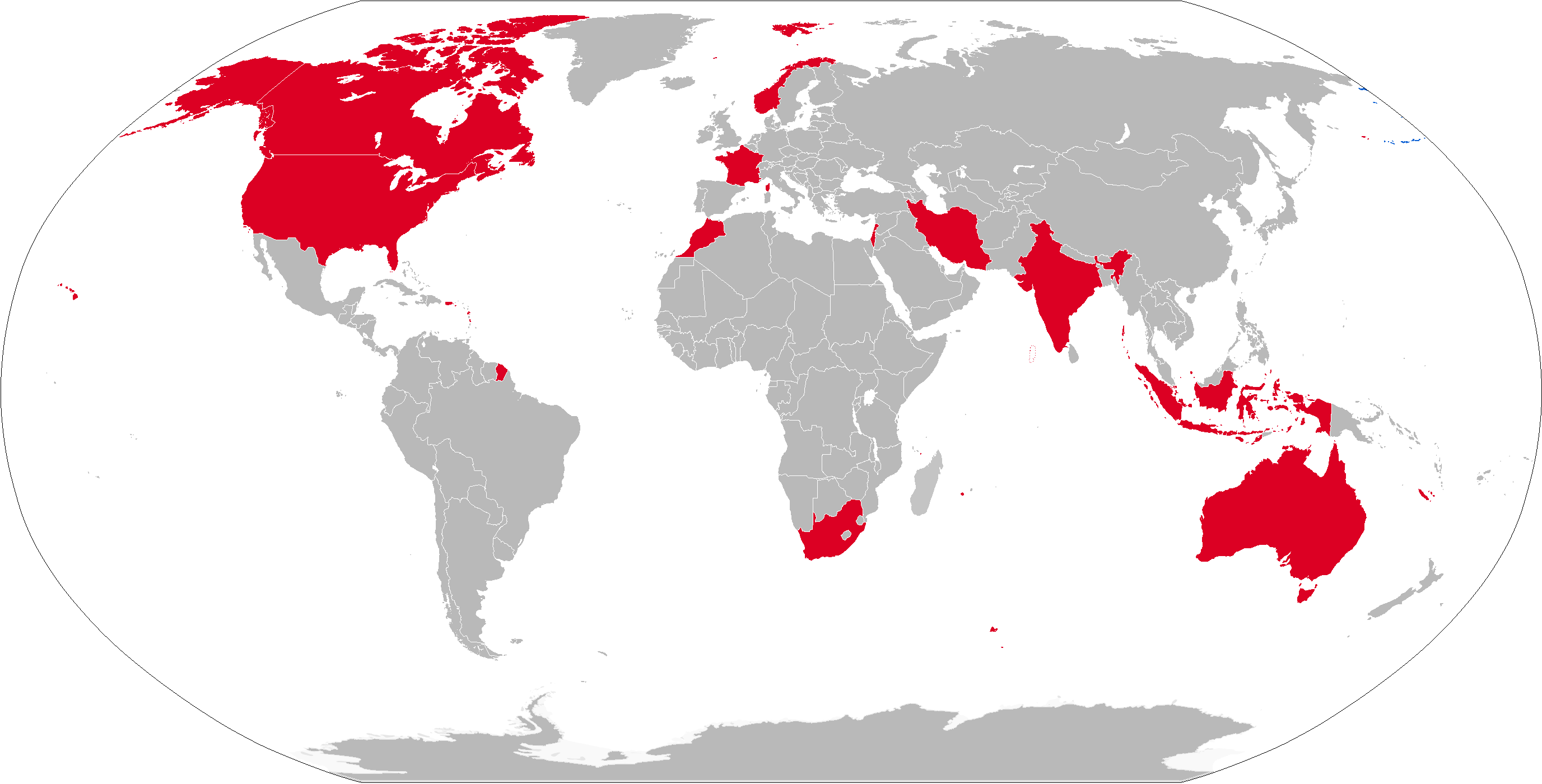
Map with former ENTAC operators in red

=== Former operators ===
- Australia - Around 500 ordered in 1962 and delivered from 1963-64. Served from 1964–1982, after which it was replaced by the MILAN.
- Belgium - Around 2,500 ordered in 1961 and delivered from 1961-66 for the AMX-VCI tank destroyer variant.
- Canada - Ordered in 1959 and delivered from 1960-1963. Around 2,000 delivered.
- France - First adopted in 1957.
- India - Around 2,000 ordered in 1967 and delivered from 1968-71. Replaced by the MILAN from 1982.
- Iran - Around 2,000 ordered in 1966 and delivered from 1966-69.
- Indonesia - Around 500 ordered in 1962 and delivered from 1963-64. Now retired.
- Israel - Around 1,000 ordered in 1962 and delivered from 1963-64.
- Lebanon - Around 200 acquired in 1967 after being ordered in 1966.
- Morocco - Around 500 ordered in 1972 and delivered from 1973 to 1974. Supplanted by BGM-71 TOW from around 1977.
- Norway - Around 1,000 ordered in 1965 and acquired from 1966-1968.
- South Africa - Around 500 acquired by 1969. Supplemented by MILAN from 1975 and eventually eased out of service.
- United States - Acquired as the MGM-32A in 1963. Replaced by the BGM-71 TOW between 1968 and 1969 and transferred to National Guard units before being retired completely by 30 September 1972.
- UNITA - Presumably acquired from South African stockpiles.
