= Wire-guided missile =

Missile guided by command via wired connection

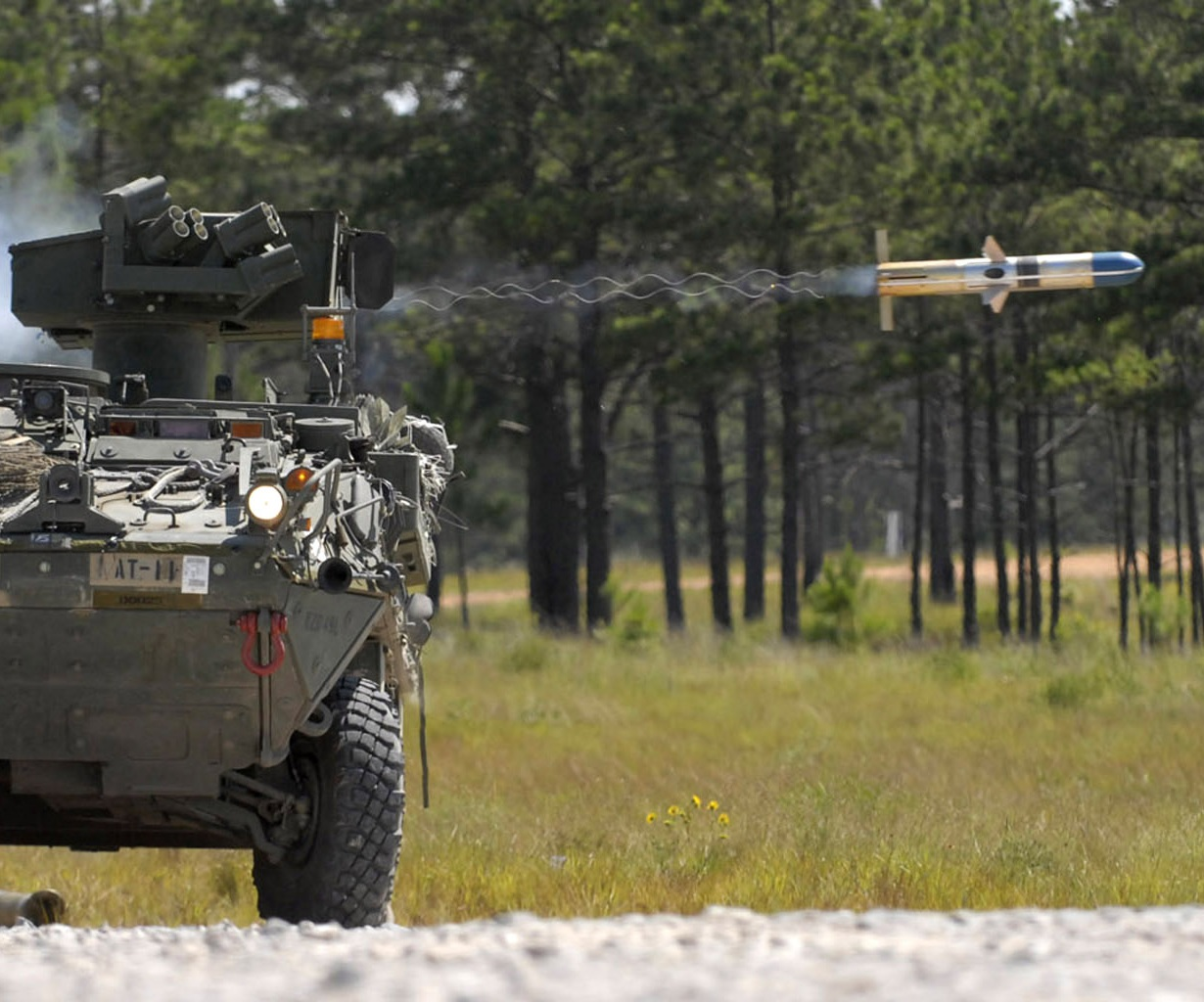
A TOW missile being fired from an M1134 ATGM vehicle, showing the two guidance wires (the wavy lines between the missile and the launcher)

A wire-guided missile is a missile that is guided by signals sent to it via thin wires connected between the missile and its launch platform using command guidance. As the missile flies, the wires are reeled out behind it. This guidance system is most commonly used in anti-tank missiles, where its ability to be used in areas of limited line-of-sight make it useful, while the range limit imposed by the length of the wire is not a serious concern.

The longest range wire-guided missiles in current use are limited to about 8 km (5.0 mi).

== History ==
Electrical wire guidance dates back to the early 20th century with an early example being the Lay Torpedo. A prototype ground-based electrical wire-guided torpedo was built by the Germans during World War II.

The pair of deployed German guided air-delivered ordnance designs, the Fritz X and Henschel Hs 293, both used the Kehl-Strassburg radio guidance system for control. However, because the British proved to be able to develop countermeasures to interfere with the Germans' use of the Kehl-Strassburg ordnance guidance system, rushed projects were started in 1944 in order to develop alternatives. The first system to be modified in this fashion was the Henschel Hs 293 anti-ship missile. Other examples included the X-4 missile.

The X-4 influenced other military thinkers after the war. By the early 1950s a number of experimental systems had been developed (for example, Malkara missile), leading to their widespread deployment in the late 1950s and early 1960s. Large numbers of Israeli tanks were destroyed using wire-guided AT-3 Sagger missiles during the Yom Kippur War of 1973. Wire guidance has remained the main system for most smaller weapons although newer systems such as laser beam riding have come into use in anti-aircraft and some anti-tank use roles (such as the US Hellfire missile and the Russian 9M133 Kornet).

Some torpedoes can be wire-guided, such as the U.S. Mk 48 Advanced Capability (ADCAP) torpedo, Russian UGST torpedo, or the Swedish Torped 613, which is guided by an insulated wire.

== Timeline ==
This is a timeline of notable early wire-guided missiles.

- 1945 X-4 missile in production in Germany.
- 1955 SS.10 enters service with the French army.
- 1956 Vickers Vigilant enters service with the British army and SS.11 with the French army.
- 1957 ENTAC enters service with the French army and the Cobra with the West German army.
- 1958 Malkara missile an Australian missile enters service with the British.
- 1960 3M6 Shmel enters service in the Soviet Union.
- 1960 Swingfire enters service in the United Kingdom.
- 1963 9M14 Malyutka enters service in the Soviet Union.
- 1970 BGM-71 TOW enters service with the US Army.
- 1970 9K111 Fagot enters service in the Soviet Union.
- 1972 MILAN is accepted for service with the French Army.
- 1974 9M113 Konkurs enters service in the Soviet Union.
- 1974/75 M47 Dragon enters service with the US Army.
- 1979 9K115 Metis enters service in the Soviet Union.

== See also ==
- Guided missile
- Missile guidance
- Semi automatic command line of sight
- Manual command line of sight
- Fiber optic drone
