= SS.11 =

French anti-tank missile

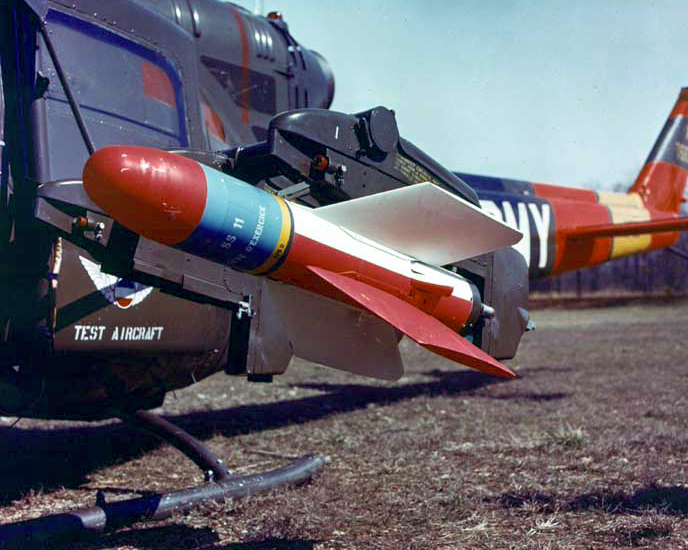
- SS.11 at the U.S. Army Redstone testing ground
- Type: MCLOS wire-guided anti-tank missile
- Place of origin: France

Production history
- Designer: Nord Aviation
- Designed: 1953
- Produced: 1956 – mid 1980s
- No. built: 180,000

Specifications
- Mass: 30 kg (66 lb)
- Length: 1,190 mm (3 ft 11 in)
- Diameter: 165 mm (6.5 in)
- Wingspan: 500 mm (1 ft 8 in)
- Effective firing range: 500–3,000 m (1,600–9,800 ft)
- Warhead: Type 140AC anti-armour
- Warhead weight: 6.8 kg (15 lb)
- Maximum speed: 190 m/s (620 ft/s)
- Guidance system: Manual command to line of sight

The SS.11 is a French manual command to line of sight wire-guided anti-tank missile manufactured by Nord Aviation. It is also available in the air-to-ground version, AS.11, which featured a stabilized sighting system. The AS.11 was also known as the AGM-22 in American service. It is among the earliest guided anti-tank missiles, entering service with the French Army in 1956 and remaining in service into the 1980s. It also formed the basis for the larger and longer-ranged SS.12/AS.12 series.

The missile was guided manually by comparing the location of the target to flares on the back of the missile and using a small joystick to adjust its flight. The original manual guidance system was replaced in 1967 to produce the Harpon version, which used SACLOS guidance using an infrared homing sensor tracking the original flares. This greatly eased the operation of the system, the operator simply had to keep the sights pointed at the target and the missile would automatically fly along the line of sight.

Production of the SS.11 and later SS.12/AS.12 series missiles ceased some time in the 1980s, by which time over 170,000 had been sold. The price of the SS.11 in the late 1960s was stated at approximately $1,900 U.S. dollars.

== History ==
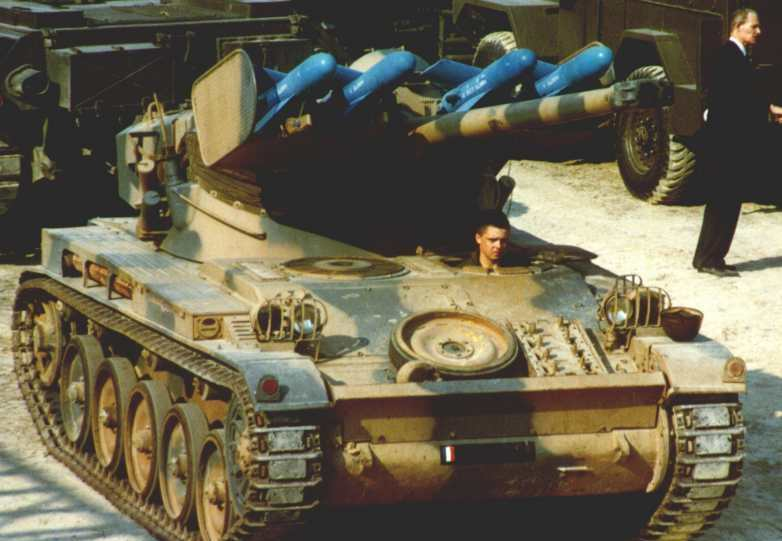
SS.11 anti-tank missile-launcher version of the French AMX-13 tank

The first combat use of the SS.11 was in 1956 by the French Air Force, fired from a Dassault MD 311 light twin-engine transport, as a method of attacking fortified caves located in steep mountain gorges during the Algerian war. The combat experiment proved extremely successful and became standard on other French Air Force MD 311s stationed in the Algerian war theater. From this early combat experience in Algeria with fixed wing aircraft firing the SS.11, the French Army took note and introduced the world's first specialized combat helicopter firing antitank missiles, based on the Aérospatiale Alouette II and later the Aérospatiale Alouette III that fired both the earlier surface-to-surface SS.11 and the AS.11 developed for air-to-surface firing from aircraft, both of which saw extensive combat in that conflict from 1958 to 1962.

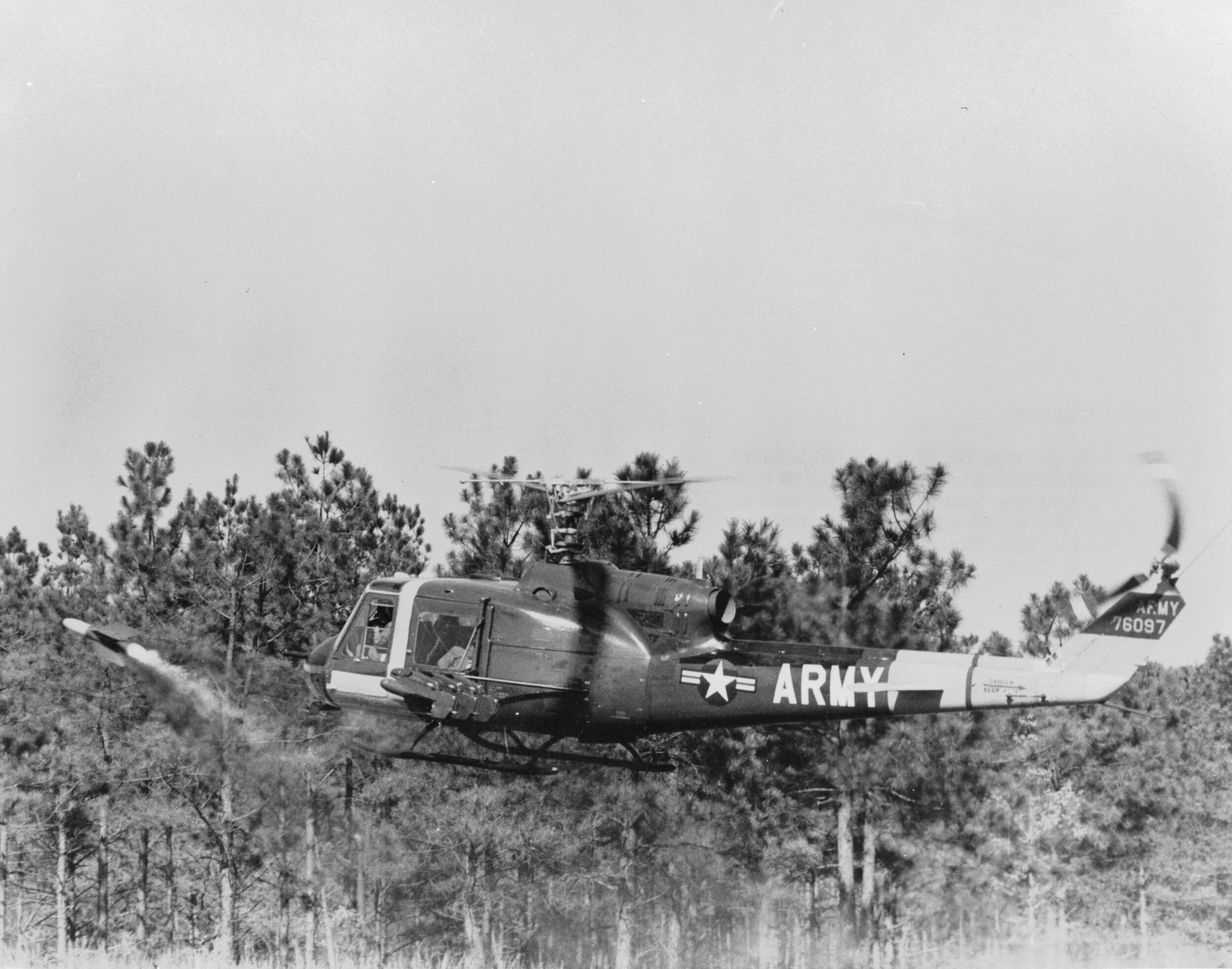
The SS.11 was integrated with the UH-1B Huey with the US Army and even saw limited combat use in Vietnam.

After the cancellation of the SSM-A-23 Dart in 1958, the United States began evaluating the SS.11, and accepted it into service in 1961 as the AGM-22A. The missile was deployed from UH-1B Huey helicopters using either the XM11 or M22 armament subsystems. In U.S. Army service, the SS.11 was used mainly to develop tactics employing antitank helicopters and to train future helicopter crews. In September 1966, 12 U.S. Army UH-1B helicopters belonging to a special unit, fitted with the XM-58 stabilized sight arrived in South Vietnam. One month later, they fired AGM-22s in combat. In May 1972 in response to the North Vietnamese armor used in the Easter Offensive six UH-1s equipped with AGM-22s were deployed in Quang Tri Province. The system was rated moderately effective against tanks, but was extensively used against bunkers and fortified structures. All units were withdrawn to the U.S. by 31 October 1972.

During the Arab-Israeli Six-Day War in 1967, the Israeli Army was equipped with a large number of SS.11s supplied by France. SS.11s were used during the battle of Abu-Ageila.

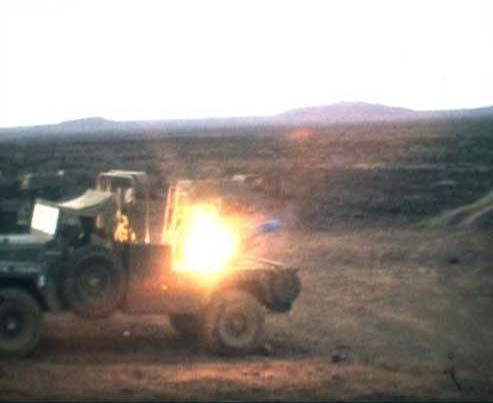
Shooting a missile from a SS.11 VLRA French in 1971.

In 1966, the French Navy did an evaluation of the SS.11(M) and SS.12(M) from the fast patrol boat La Combattante. In 1966, the Libyan Navy ordered three Vosper Thornycroft fast patrol boats (the Sebha, Sirte and Susa). Delivered in 1968, these were the first naval vessels to be armed with the SS.11(M) and AS.12(M) being armed with four on each side of the vessel's bridge; the Libyan fast patrol boats proved that this was a very low-cost way to give long-range heavy firepower to small naval vessels. Other navies soon followed Libya and bought the SS.12(M) and SS.11(M) for their light naval vessels; among them Brunei, Ethiopia, France, Greece, Ivory Coast, Malaysia, Senegal, and Tunisia. NORD also developed a ten-missile trainable launcher for either the SS.11(M) or SS.12(M), which was sold in numbers due to its extremely cost-effective firepower for both light and medium size naval craft.

During the Falklands War, both the British Army and the British Royal Marines used Westland Scout helicopters armed with the SS.11. On 14 June 1982, two Army and two Marine Scouts attacked Argentine positions on the south-west outskirts of Port Stanley. Of the ten missiles fired, nine hit their targets and one was lost due to a command wire breaking.

== Development ==
Development of an improved version of the SS.10 (Nord-5203) began in 1953 as the Nord-5210. The missile was intended as a heavy version of the man-portable SS.10 for use from vehicles, ships and helicopters. The missile entered service with the French army as the designation SS.11. It was used as the first helicopter-mounted anti-tank missile in the world (on Alouette IIs).

From 1962, a "B" model of the missile was produced, which replaced some of the original electronics with solid state components. The transistorization improved response time and handling, which reduced the tendency to over-correct during flight. This was the version used for the development of an infantry version, in which the operator carried three warheads and had a "waist belt fire-control," and three other men carried the missile minus its warhead.

One of the most unusual uses of the SS.11 was that of probably the smallest anti-shipping missile in the world, with the Swedish Marines employing it in the anti-landing craft role for decades, until it was replaced by a specialized version of the AGM-114 Hellfire. It was also used by the Finnish coastal artillery for covering narrow channels in the archipelago, being replaced in this role by the Israeli SPIKE ER (Rannikko-Ohjus 06).

== Description ==
A variety of warheads are available for the missile:

- 140AC hollow-charge: 600 mm versus RHA
- 140AP02 blast-fragmentation: 10 mm steel plate
- 140AP59 anti personnel
- 140CCN anti-shipping

On launch, the SNPE rocket booster, with two outlets on the side of the missile body, burns for 1.2 seconds, after which the Sophie sustainer engine, with single outlet in the rear of the missile body burns for 20 seconds.

Unlike the earlier SS.10, which steered similarly to an airplane with small flight controls called "spoilers" located on the missiles wings, the SS.11 is steered in flight by a unique system developed by NORD for France's first air-to-air missile, the AA.20, called TVC (thrust vectoring control) in which four small vanes are located around the sustainer's exhaust, which under command momentarily push into the sustainer's thrust causing the missile to move in the direction commanded. Since the missile spins slowly in flight by having the four swept wings slightly offset, a gyroscope is needed to determine the missile's relative orientation to the ground, that is, up, down and right, left. Unlike the earlier spoiler flight control, TVC is a far more precise method of controlling a missile in flight. TVC has been copied by other missile designs, including the Russians with their 9M14 Malyutka (NATO name: AT-3 Sagger) and the Euromissile HOT and MILAN developed by joint venture of the French and Germans.

Due to the manual nature of the guidance, called MCLOS, where the operator had to first gain control of the missile and bring it into his line of sight with the target, engagements of targets at short range were poor, but beyond 500 meters accuracy was good to excellent for a well trained operator. In 1967 (by which time NORD had been merged with Aerospatiale), a version of the SS.11, called Harpon, was developed with a much improved guidance system called SACLOS in which the missile is automatically tracked in flight and brought to the gunner's line of sight. This guidance system drastically increases the SS.11 accuracy, especially at engagement ranges of less than 500 meters.

== Models ==
- SS.11/AGM-22: Surface-to-surface wire-guided anti-tank missile.
  - SS.11A1 XAGM-22A
  - SS.11B1 XAGM-22B: Much improved with transistors
  - SS.11B1 (training) XATM-22B
- AS.11: Air-to-surface missile.
- SS.11M: Maritime surface-to-surface wire-guided anti-ship missile.
- HARPON: SS.11 version with SACLOS guidance replacing MCLOS. Entered production in 1967

== Operators ==
- Abu Dhabi
- Argentina
- Bahrain
- Belgium
- Brazil
- Brunei
- Canada
- Denmark
- Ethiopia
- Finland - SS 11 B 1, known as Rannikko-ohjus 63 (RO-63).
- France
- Germany
- Greece
- India
- Indonesia
- Iraq
- Israel
- Italy
- Ivory Coast
- Lebanon
- Libya
- Malaysia - aboard RMN Pendekar-class fast patrol boats (now retired)
- Netherlands
- Norway
- Peru
- Portugal
- Saudi Arabia
- Senegal
- Syria
- South Africa
- Spain - aboard army Aérospatiale Alouette III and navy Sikorsky SH-3/AB-212 ASW helicopters
- Sweden - coastal defense against landing craft (Robot 52)
- Switzerland
- Tunisia
- United Kingdom
- Uganda
- United States
- Venezuela

== See also ==
- Aerospatiale SS.12/AS.12, a later derivative of the Nord SS.11
- Raketenjagdpanzer 1, Germany ATGM carrier AFV of 1961
