= Anti-tank guided missile =

Guided missile for combat against armored targets

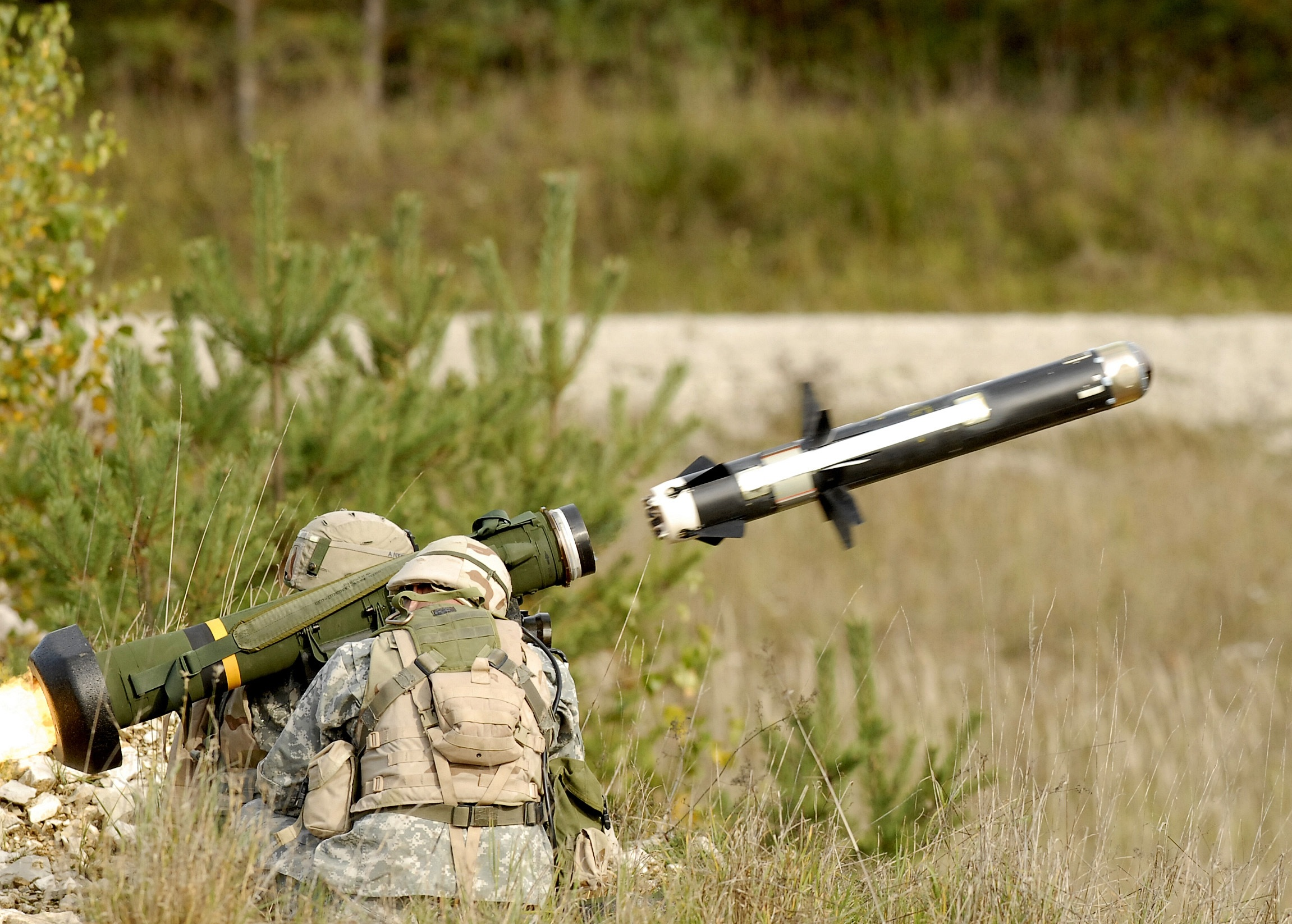
FGM-148 Javelin anti-tank missile of the United States Army

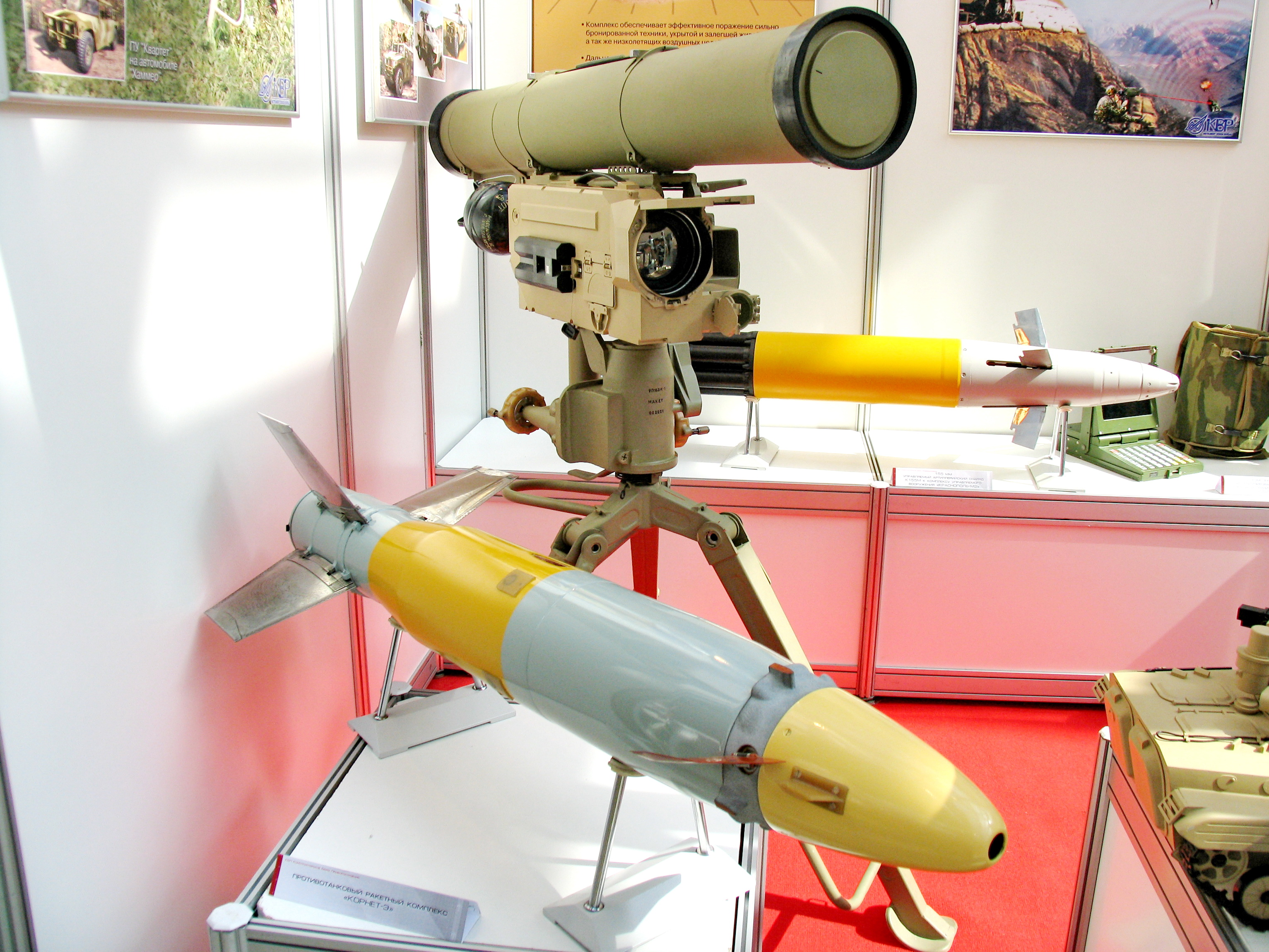
The 9M133 Kornet tripod-mounted ATGM of the Russian Ground Forces

An anti-tank guided missile (ATGM), anti-tank missile, anti-tank guided weapon (ATGW) or anti-armor guided weapon is a guided missile primarily designed to hit and destroy heavily armored military vehicles. ATGMs range in size from shoulder-launched weapons, which can be transported by a single soldier, to larger tripod-mounted weapons, which require a squad or team to transport and fire, to vehicle and aircraft mounted missile systems.

Earlier man-portable anti-tank weapons, like anti-tank rifles and magnetic anti-tank mines, generally had very short range, sometimes on the order of metres or tens of metres. Rocket-propelled high-explosive anti-tank (HEAT) systems appeared in World War II and extended range to the order of hundreds of metres, but accuracy was low and hitting targets at these ranges was largely a matter of luck. It was the combination of rocket propulsion and remote wire guidance that made the ATGM much more effective than these earlier weapons, and gave light infantry real capability on the battlefield against post-war tank designs. The introduction of semi-automatic guidance in the 1960s further improved the performance of ATGMs.

As of 2016, ATGMs were used by over 130 countries and many non-state actors around the world. Post-Cold-War main battle tanks (MBTs) using composite and reactive armors have proven to be resistant to smaller ATGMs.

== History ==
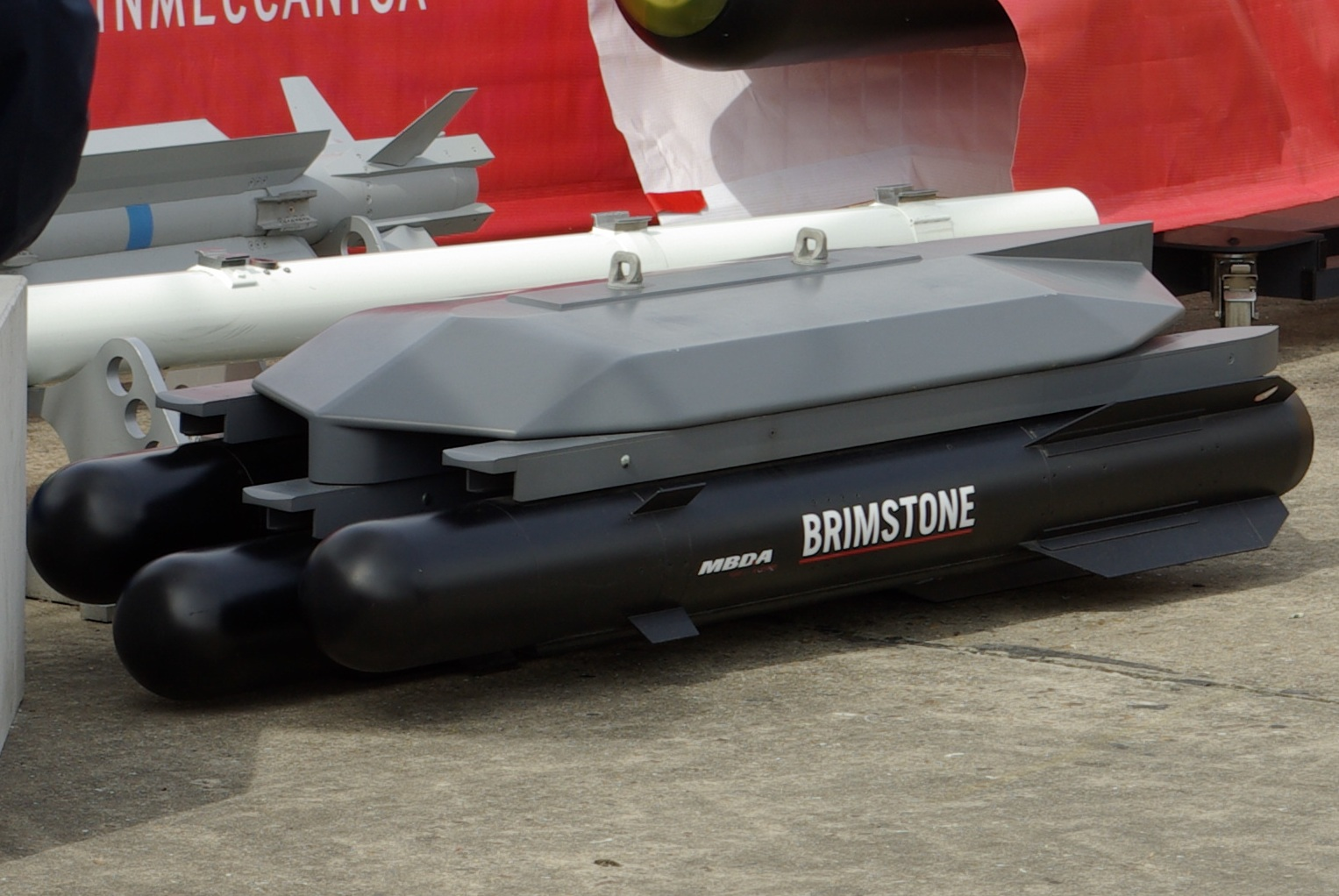
The Brimstone missile is a fire-and-forget missile of the RAF

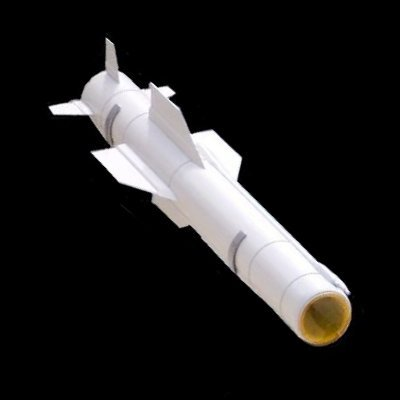
PARS 3 LR fire-and-forget missile of the German Army

=== World War II ===
Germany developed a design for a wire-guided anti tank missile derived from the Ruhrstahl X-4 air to air missile concept in the closing years of World War II. Known as the X-7, it was probably never used in combat and allegedly had serious guidance to target issues. It never entered service, though a few were produced.

=== Early Cold War: first generation ATGMs ===
First-generation ATGMs use a type of command guidance termed manual command to line of sight (MCLOS). This requires continuous input from an operator using a joystick or similar control system to steer the missile to a target. One disadvantage of this is that an operator must keep the sight's reticle cross hairs on a target and then steer the missile into the cross hairs, i.e., the line-of-sight. To do this, an operator must be well trained (spending many hours on a simulator) and must remain stationary and in view of a target during the flight time of the missile. Because of this, the operator is vulnerable while guiding the missile. In addition to the low kill probability, other problems with first generation ATGMs include slow missile speed, high minimum effective range, and an inability to use top attack missiles.

The first system to become operational and to see combat was the French Nord SS.10 during the early 1950s. It entered service in the French Army in 1955. It was also the first anti-tank missile used by the US Army and Israel Defense Forces. The Malkara missile (named from an Aboriginal Australian word for "shield") was another of the earliest ATGMs. It was jointly developed by Australia and the United Kingdom between 1951 and 1954, and was in service from 1958 until gradually replaced by the Vickers Vigilant missile in the late 1960s. It was intended to be light enough to deploy with airborne forces, yet powerful enough to knock out any tank then in service. It used a 26 kilograms (57 lb) high-explosive squash head (HESH) warhead. Other early first generation ATGMs include the West German Cobra and the Soviet 9M14 Malyutka.

In 2012, first-generation systems were described as obsolete due to low hit probability, a limited ability to penetrate modern armour, and other issues. Still, many countries maintain significant stockpiles. Approximately, first generation ATGMs have an effective range of 1500m and the ability to penetrate 500mm of rolled homogeneous armor.

=== Late Cold War: second generation ATGMs ===
Second-generation semi-automatically command guided to line-of-sight, or semi-automatic command to line of sight (SACLOS) missiles require an operator to only keep the sights on the target until impact. Automatic guidance commands are sent to the missile through wires or radio, or the missile relies on laser marking or a TV camera view from the nose of the missile. Examples are the Russian 9M133 Kornet, Israeli LAHAT, the NLOS version of Spike, and the American Hellfire I missiles. The operator must remain stationary during the missile's flight. The most widely used ATGM of all time, the American BGM-71 TOW, with hundreds of thousands of missiles built, is a second-generation system.

Second generation ATGMs are significantly easier to use than first generation systems, and accuracy rates may exceed 90%. Generally they have an effective range of between 2,500 and 5,500 meters and penetration of up to 900 mm of armor. Cost is around $10,000 USD per missile.

=== Post Cold War: third generation ATGMs and later ===
Third-generation "fire-and-forget" missiles rely on a laser, electro-optical imager (IIR) seeker or a W band radar seeker in the nose of the missile. Once the target is identified, the missile needs no further guidance during flight; it is "fire-and-forget", and the missile operator is free to retreat. However, fire-and-forget missiles are more subject to electronic countermeasures than MCLOS and SACLOS missiles. Examples include the German PARS 3 LR and the Israeli Spike.

Most modern ATGMs have shaped charge HEAT warheads, designed specifically for penetrating tank armor. Tandem-charge missiles attempt to defeat explosive reactive armour (ERA): the small initial charge sets off the ERA while the follow-up main charge attempts to penetrate the main armor. Top-attack weapons such as the US Javelin, the Swedish Bill and the Indian Nag and MPATGM are designed to strike vehicles from above, where their armor is usually much weaker. Third generation systems and beyond are generally much more expensive than second generation systems.

=== Fourth generation ATGMs ===
SANT missile fired from Mi-24

Fourth generation fire-and-forget anti tank guided missiles have larger range and rely on a combination of seeker for guidance. Examples include India's SANT, which has a stand-off range of 15 to 20 km (9 to 12 mi), uses dual seeker configuration of electro-optical thermal imager (EO/IR) and millimeter-wave active radar homing for control and guidance with lock-on before launch and lock-on after launch capabilities.

=== Fifth generation ATGMs ===
Some ATGMs, notably the French Akeron MP and the latest variants of the Israeli Spike (such as the Spike LR2 and ER2), have been called "5th generation" by their manufacturers and marketed as such. They appear to have the following additional or amplified attributes:

- passive dual-band seeker (TV and uncooled IR);
- multipurpose tandem warhead;
- smokeless propellant;
- less collateral damage;
- possible counter-active protection system (CAPS) capability;
- man in the loop technology;
- emphasis on targets other than tanks;
- other updates such as artificial intelligence for the missile.

== Countermeasures ==
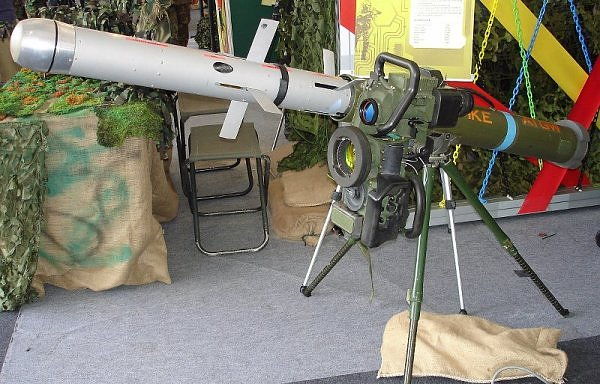
Spike missile, capable of making a top attack flight profile

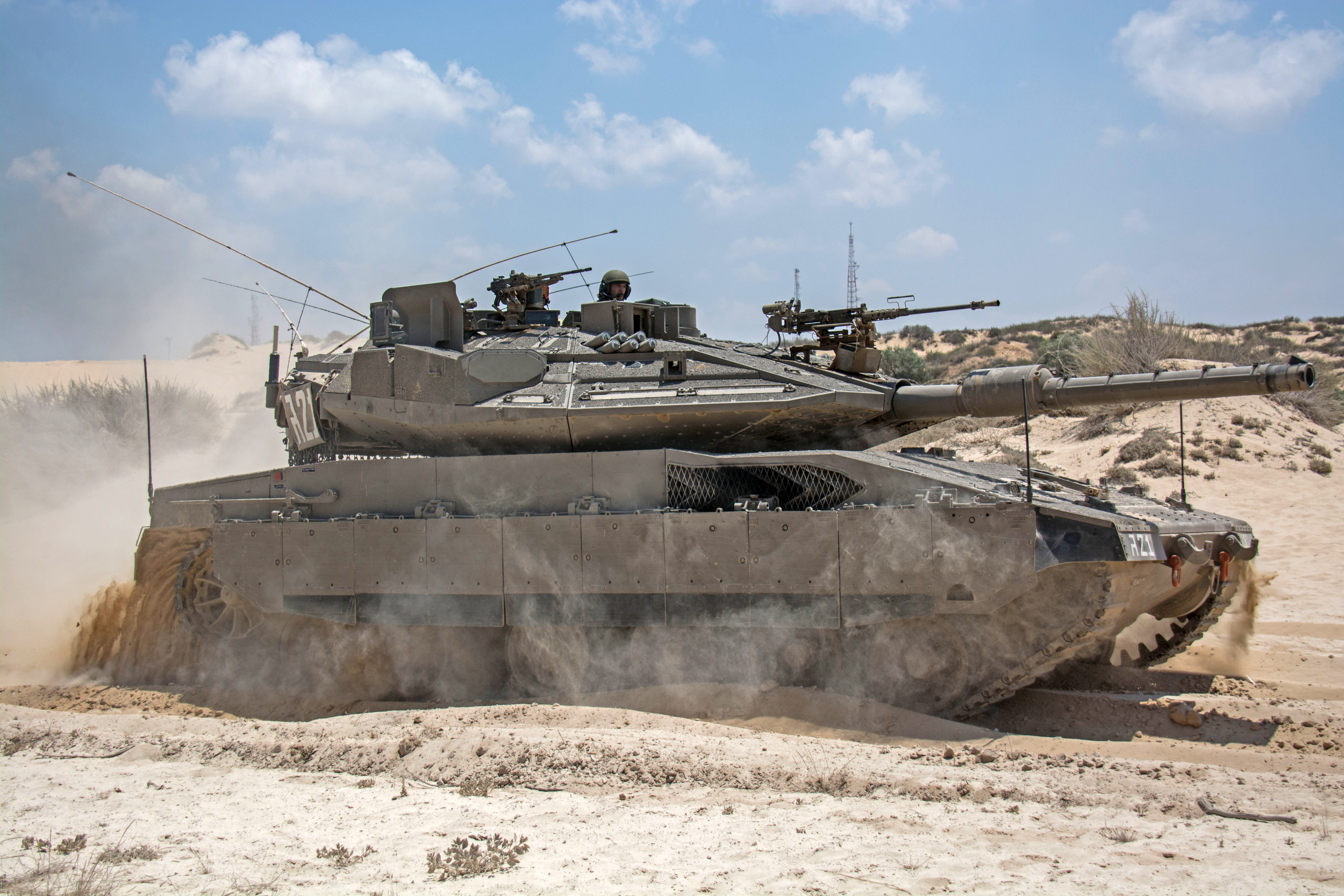
Merkava Mk 4m with the Trophy APS during Operation Protective Edge

Countermeasures against ATGMs include newer armors such as spaced, perforated, composite or explosive reactive armor, jammers like the Russian Shtora, active protection systems (APS) like the Israeli Trophy and the Russian Arena, and other methods.

=== Newer armor ===
Armor systems have continued in development alongside ATGMs, and the most recent generations of armor are specifically tested to be effective against ATGM strikes, either by deforming the missile warhead or fusing to prevent proper detonation (such as in slat armor) or using some form of reactive armor to 'attack' the missile upon impact, disrupting the shaped charge that makes the warhead effective. Both come with the downside of significant weight and bulk. Reactive armor works best when a vehicle is specifically designed with the system integrated and while developments continue to make armor lighter, any vehicle that includes such a system necessitates a powerful engine and often will still be relatively slow. Inclusion of such armor in older vehicles as a part of a re-design is possible, as in the numerous types derived from the T-72. Slat armor is lighter and as such can be added to many vehicles after construction but still adds both bulk and weight. Particularly for vehicles that are designed to be transported by cargo aircraft, slat armor has to be fitted in the field after deployment. Either approach can never offer complete coverage over the vehicle, leaving tracks or wheels particularly vulnerable to attack.

=== Jamming ===
Jamming is potentially an effective countermeasure to specific missiles that are radar guided, however, as a general purpose defense, it is of no use against unguided anti-tank weapons, and as such it is almost never the only defense. If jamming is used continually, it can be extremely difficult for a missile to acquire the target, locking on to the much larger return from the jammer, with the operator unlikely noticing the difference without a radar screen to see the return. However, any missile that has a backup tracking system can defeat jamming.

=== Active ===
Active protection systems show a great deal of promise, both in counteracting ATGMs and unguided weapons. Compared to armor systems, they are very lightweight, can be fitted to almost any vehicle with the internal space for the control system and could, in the future, be a near-perfect defense against any missiles. The weaknesses of the systems include potential developments in missile design such as radar or IR decoys, which would drastically reduce their chance to intercept a missile, as well as technical challenges such as dealing with multiple missiles at once and designing a system that can cover a vehicle from any angle of attack. While these may be answered and allow for lightweight, highly maneuverable vehicles that are strongly defended against missiles and rockets that are extremely well suited for urban and guerrilla warfare, such a system is unlikely to be as effective against kinetic energy projectiles, making it a poor choice for fighting against tanks. As kinetic energy projectiles move faster than guided missiles, this often means that the sensors attached to an active protection system can not keep up.

=== Other ===
Traditionally, before "fire-and-forget" ATGMs were used, the most effective countermeasure was to open fire at the location where the missile was fired from, to either kill the operator or force them to take cover, thus sending the missile off course. Smoke screens can also be deployed from an MBT's smoke discharger, and used to obscure an ATGM operator's line of sight. Other improvised methods used by the Israel Defense Forces to defeat the Saggers involved firing in front of the tank to create dust. While fire-and-forget missiles have definitive advantages in terms of guidance and operator safety, and include abilities such as top attack mode, older missiles continue in use, both in the front line armies of less developed countries, and in reserve service the world over, due to their lower cost or existing stockpiles of less advanced weapons.

== See also ==
- List of anti-tank missiles
- List of gun-launched missiles
- List of man-portable anti-tank systems
- List of missiles
- List of grenade launchers
- List of rocket launchers
- Guided Multipurpose Munition
