= Manual command to line of sight =

Method for guiding guided missiles

Manual command to line of sight (MCLOS or MACLOS) is a method for guiding guided missiles.

With an MCLOS missile, the operator must track the missile and the target simultaneously and guide the missile to the target. Typically the missile is steered with a joystick, and its path is observed through a periscope-type telescopic sight. The missiles are usually equipped with a magnesium flare in the base that automatically ignites on launch and allows the gunner to visually track the fast-moving missile in a manner similar in concept to tracer ammunition.

MCLOS requires considerable training and practice to master, since even a minor disruption in the gunner's concentration would likely cause a miss. These guidance systems have marginal accuracy on tank-sized targets, even with perfect line-of-sight by the gunner, due to erratic flight paths requiring timely manual corrections. As demonstrated by the Israeli Army under fire from Soviet-armed Arab states, responding to the distinctive smoke puff of a missile launch with rapid manoeuvres and immediate counter-fire minimizes their accuracy, as very few anti-tank guided missile (ATGM) gunners maintain their concentration on a fast-moving tank for the entire flight time of the missile while under suppressing fire.

MCLOS guidance today has mostly been replaced by the easier-to-use semi-automatic command to line of sight (SACLOS), which allows the gunner to merely track the target with an optical sight (which guides the missile), rather than being forced to both visually track the target and fly the missile manually. The Vickers Vigilant attempted to solve this by using a "velocity control" method with an on-board gyroscope, rather than simpler "acceleration control".

== Accuracy ==
The accuracy achieved by MCLOS missiles is hard to put a firm figure on, since it is highly dependent on the skill of the operator and any distractions the operator has to contend with (such as being fired upon). Actual figures from combat operations suggest that it is much lower than SACLOS guided missiles.

- Six-Day War 1967 – AT-1 Snapper – limited use, only one tank kill is attributed with a hit probability of less than 25%.
- Vietnam War 1972 – fired by American troops, the French SS.11 – about 10% compared with over 50% for the SACLOS BGM-71 TOW.
- Yom Kippur War 1973 – AT-3 Sagger – between 25% at the start in well trained Egyptian hands and 2% at the end in less well trained Syrian hands once the threat was understood by Israeli tank crews.

== MCLOS missiles and guided bombs ==
- AGM-12 Bullpup
- Azon
- Fritz X
- Henschel Hs 117, Hs 293
- Ruhrstahl X-4
- Wasserfall
- SS.11
- ENTAC
- Malkara
- Blowpipe missile
- 3M6 Shmel
- 9M14 Malyutka
- Vickers Vigilant
- Saab Rb 05
- SSM-A-23 Dart
- Swingfire (early models)

== See also ==
- Television guidance
- Index of aviation articles
- List of established military terms
