= List of anti-tank missiles =

This is a list of anti-tank guided missiles developed by different countries.

== Argentina ==
- Mathogo

== Australia ==
- Malkara

== Belarus ==
- Shershen

== Brazil ==
- MSS-1.2
- FOG-MPM

== Canada ==
- Eryx

== China ==
- CM-501G
- PA02-MA
- PA01-GA
- TS-01
- HJ-73
- HJ-8
- HJ-9
- CM-502KG
- HJ-11
- HJ-10
- BA-9
- BA-7
- AR-1
- AKD-10
- Type 98 anti-tank rocket
- Type 78/65
- AFT-10
- HJ-12

== France ==
- ENTAC
- Eryx
- SS.10
- SS.11
- MILAN
- HOT
- ACRA
- Polyphem
- TRIGAT LR
- Akeron MP

== Germany ==
- Cobra
- Cobra 2000
- HOT
- Mamba
- MILAN
- SMAT (Cancelled)
- PARS 3

== India ==
- DRDO Anti Tank Missile
- Amogha missile
- Nag missile
- HELINA /Dhruvastra
- SANT
- MPATGM
- SAMHO cannon launched anti tank guided missile
- Jasmine anti tank missile - VEM technologies

== Iran ==
- RAAD
- Tosan
- Dehlavieh/9M133 Kornet
- Dehlavieh-2
- Saeghe
- Toophan
- Sadid-1
- Sadid-345
- Almas-1
- Almas-2
- Almas-3
- Ghaem-114
- Ghaem-1
- Ghaem-5
- Ghaem-9
- Akhgar NLOS
- Almas

== Israel ==
- Spike
- Orev (upgraded BGM-71 TOW-2)
- MAPATS
- LAHAT – fired through smoothbore tank gun tubes of Merkava tanks
- Nimrod

== Italy ==
- Mosquito

== Japan ==
- Type 64 MAT
- Type 79 Jyu-MAT
- Type 87 Chu-MAT
- Type 96 MPMS
- Middle-range multi-purpose missile
- Type 01 LMAT

== Jordan ==
- Terminator

== North Korea ==
- Bulsae-1
- Bulsae-2
- Bulsae-3
- Bulsae-4

== South Korea ==
- AT-1K Raybolt

== Pakistan ==
- Barq
- Baktar Shikan
- Baktar Shikan (Air launched Variant)

== Poland ==
- Pirat (missile)
- MOSKIT (ATGM)

== Serbia ==
- Bumbar
- ALAS

== South Africa ==
- ZT3 Ingwe
- Mokopa

== Soviet Union and Russian Federation ==
- Drakon, used with the IT-1 missile tank that saw very little service.
- Taifun, a prototype missile that never saw production.
- 3M6 Shmel (AT-1 Snapper)
- 3M11 Falanga (AT-2 Swatter)
- 9M14 Malyutka (AT-3 Sagger)
- 9M111 Fagot (AT-4 Spigot)
- 9M112 Kobra (AT-8 Songster) – fired through smoothbore tank gun tubes of T-64 and T-72 tanks
- 9M113 Konkurs (AT-5 Spandrel)
- 9K114 Shturm (AT-6 Spiral) – Can be air-launched
- 9K115 Metis (AT-7 Saxhorn)
- 9K115-2 Metis-M (AT-13 Saxhorn-2)
- 9K116-1 Bastion (AT-10 Stabber) – fired through rifled tank gun tubes of T-55 tank
- 9K118 Sheksna (AT-12 Swinger) – fired through smoothbore tank gun tubes of T-62 tank
- 9M119 Svir / 9M119M Refleks (AT-11 Sniper) - fired through smoothbore tank gun tubes of T-64, T-72, T-80, T-84, T-90 tanks
- 9M120 Ataka (AT-9 Spiral-2) – Can be air-launched
- 9K121 Vikhr (AT-16 Scallion) – air-launched, sometimes confused with AT-9
- 9M123 Khrizantema (AT-15 Springer)
- 9M133 Kornet (AT-14 Spriggan)
- 9M133M Kornet-M
- Hermes-A

== Spain ==
- C-90
- C-100

== Sweden ==
- Bantam
- RBS 56 BILL
- RBS 56B BILL 2
- NLAW

== Switzerland ==
- Cobra

== Turkey ==
- UMTAS (160mm long range anti-tank missile)
- OMTAS (160mm medium range anti-tank missile)
- KARAOK (125mm man-portable short-range anti-tank missile)
- TANOK (120mm gun launched anti-tank missile)
- Cirit (70mm anti-armor missile)

== United Kingdom ==
- Malkara
- NLAW
- Swingfire
- Brimstone (air-launched)
- Vickers Vigilant

== United States ==
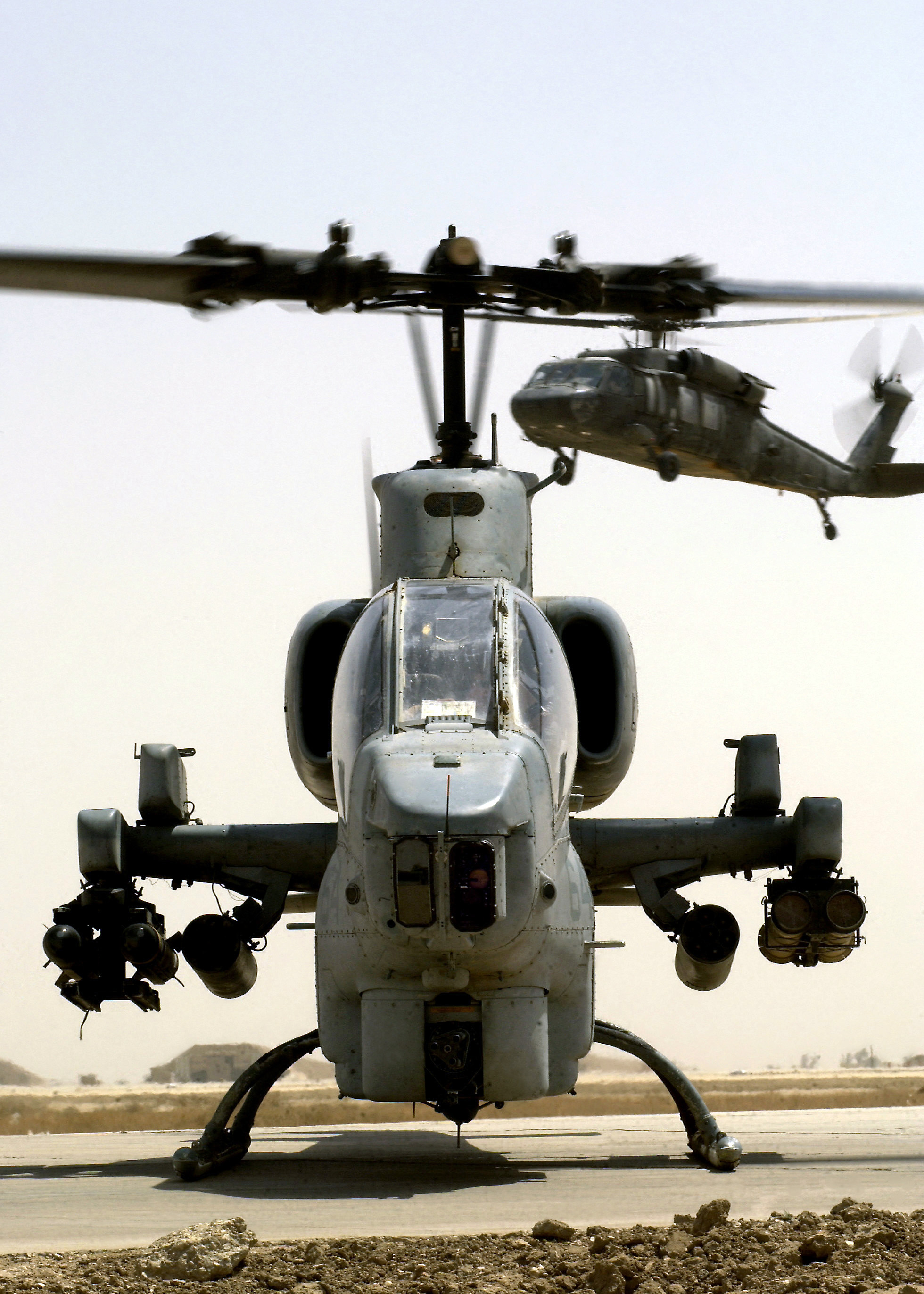
AH-1W with Hellfire (left) and BGM-71 TOW missiles (right)

- M47 Dragon (no longer in service)
- Javelin (in service)
- SRAW (no longer in service)
- BGM-71 TOW (in service)
- AGM-114 Hellfire (in service)
- MGM-166 (canceled)

== Ukraine ==
- RK-3 Corsar
- Skif (ATGM)
- Stuhna-P

== See also ==
- List of missiles
- List of MANPATS (man-portable anti-tank systems)
- List of rocket launchers
- Shoulder-launched missile weapon
