= SMAT =

SMAT may refer to:

- Small molecule anti-genomic therapeutics
- Santa Maria Area Transit
- Science Math Aptitude Test
- The School of Mission Aviation Technology, located at Ionia County Airport in Michigan
- Sub-munition anti-tank or SMAT, a 1990s German prototype air-to-ground anti-tank missile
