= HJ-10 =

Chinese anti-tank missile

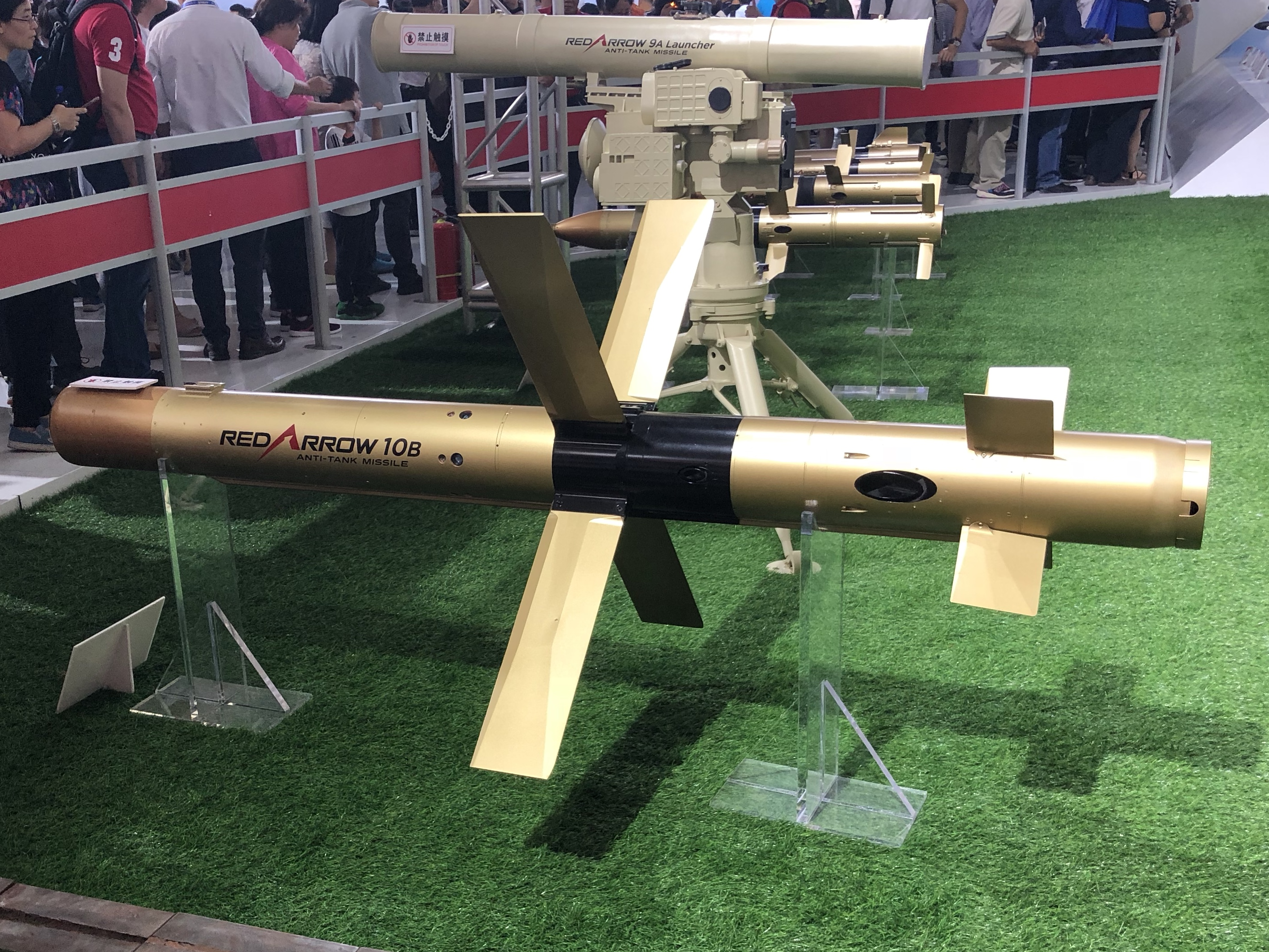
- Type: Non-line-of-sight anti-tank, anti-helicopter and surface-to-surface missile
- Place of origin: People's Republic of China

Service history
- In service: 2011–present
- Used by: See Operators

Production history
- Designer: Xi'an Institute of Modern Control Technology of the China North Industries Group Corporation
- Designed: 1989–2006
- Manufacturer: Norinco
- Produced: 2011–present

Specifications
- Mass: 150 kg (330 lb)
- Length: 1,850 mm (6.07 ft)
- Diameter: 165 mm (6.5 in)
- Warhead: 48 kg (106 lb) of high-explosive anti-tank (HEAT) or High-Explosive Fragmentation (HE-Frag)
- Operational range: 10 km (6.2 mi); 25 km (16 mi) (extended range)
- Maximum speed: 150 m/s (340 mph) (cruise); 230 m/s (510 mph) (attack)
- Guidance system: fiber-optic wire-guided missile (AFT-10) with TV and infrared homing seekers
- Launch platform: See Launch platforms

HJ-10 or HongJian-10 (Chinese: 红箭-10; pinyin: Hóng Jiàn-Shí; lit. 'Red Arrow-10'), military designation: AFT-10, is a Chinese vehicle-mounted, surface-launched, non-line-of-sight (NLOS), heavy anti-tank missile developed by the Xi'an Institute of Modern Control Technology of the China North Industries Group Corporation (Norinco).

== History ==
The HJ-10 missile system began preliminary development in 1989, led by Zou Ruping (Chinese: 邹汝平). The fiber-optic missile prototype was demonstrated to the People's Liberation Army Ground Force (PLAGF) in 1998, but did not attract any interest from the military. The project was restarted in 2006 for PLAGF service certification. The HJ-10 missile system was certified in 2011 and entered production in the same year.

In 2014, the HJ-10 (AFT-10) long-range anti-tank vehicle participated in the Peace Mission 2014 joint military exercise, organized by the Shanghai Cooperation Organization (SCO). This was HJ-10's first public appearance.

In 2015, the HJ-10 system was observed in deployment at the PLA Ground Force corps-level fire support unit. In 2017, the HJ-10 was issued to the lower-echelon brigade-level fire support unit. It's observed that the HJ-10 is issued to the long-range anti-tank company, under the fire support battalion of the heavy combined arms brigade. In each anti-tank missile company, there are 9 launch vehicles, one command vehicle, and several ammunition vehicles.

== Design ==
The HJ-10 (AFT-10) missile system can be mounted on various platforms. In the 2014 Peace Mission exercise, it was mounted on the ZBD-04A chassis. On the ZBD-04A chassis, eight missiles and a retractable sensor mast are mounted, with sensors including a thermal camera, TV camera, and a laser range finder. A millimeter-wave radar system is mounted at the front-right corner of the vehicle to improve all-weather operation capability. Inside the vehicle, a dual-seat, dual-screen control station allows two operators to fire and control two separate missiles in quick succession under 10 seconds. Other vehicle platform of the missile system include the Type 08 (VN1) chassis, Type 05 amphibious armored vehicle chassis, CTM-133 truck chassis, and CTL181A assault vehicle chassis.

The HJ-10 (AFT-10) missile with launcher weighs 150 kg (330 lb), has a warhead of 43 kg (95 lb), a length of 1,850 mm (6.07 ft), a width of 165 mm (6.5 in), a cruise speed of 150 m/s (340 mph), and an attack speed of 230 m/s (510 mph), powered by a solid-rocket booster and a micro turbojet engine. The missile has a maximum range of 10 km (6.2 mi), with the extended-range version offering 25 km (16 mi).

The HJ-10 (AFT-10) has a tandem high-explosive anti-tank (HEAT) warhead that may penetrate 1,400 mm (55 in) of conventional steel armour protected by explosive reactive armour. It also has a high-explosive fragmentation warhead that can be field swapped for engaging low-flying aircraft. The missile operates in a non-line-of-sight (NLOS) manner, with the missile transmitting a live feed via an optical fiber from the combined television and infrared tracking sensors to the operators, who could lock the engagement targets prior- or post-launch. The missile sensor can track various targets such as tanks, helicopters, and surface vessels.

The HJ-10 system is conceptually similar to the American NETFIRES program. The missile is roughly analogous to Israel's Spike-ER, Serbia's ALAS and North Korea's Bulsae-4. The HJ-10 should not be confused with the AKD-10 air-to-surface missile, which is called Blue Arrow-10 for export and is similar in size and weight class to the American AGM-114 Hellfire.

== Launch platforms ==
- ZBD-04A AT: Eight AFT-10 missiles with sensors mounted on ZBD-04A chassis.
- ZBD-05 AT: Twelve AFT-10 missiles with sensors mounted on ZBD-05 chassis.
- ZBL-08/VN1 AT: Eight AFT-10 missiles with sensors mounted on Type 08 (VN-1) 8x8 chassis.
- CTM-133 AT: Eight AFT-10 missiles with sensors mounted on CTM-133 truck chassis.
- CTL-181A AT: Four AFT-10 missiles with sensors mounted on CTL-181A assault vehicle chassis.

== Operators ==
- China
  - People's Liberation Army Ground Force — approximately 200 ZBD-04A ATGM Carrier in service as of 2020. Unknown number of other platforms.

== Specfications ==
The AFT-10 (Chinese: 反坦克导弹-10; pinyin: Fǎn tǎnkè dǎodàn-10; lit. 'Anti-tank missile-10') is the surface-to-surface variant in the HJ-10 family, receiving designation of AFT-10. AFT-10 is a fiber-optic wire-guided missile.

HJ-10 missile specifications
| | HJ-10 (AFT-10) |
|---|---|
| Introduction | 2011 |
| System length | |
| Missile length | 1,850 mm (6.07 ft) |
| System weight | 150 kg (330 lb) |
| Missile weight | |
| Missile diameter | 165 mm (6.5 in) |
| Warhead | 48 kg (106 lb) |
| Warhead type | High-explosive anti-tank (HEAT) or High-explosive-fragmentation (HE-Frag) |
| Guidance | Fiber-optics man-in-the-loop command guidance (pre- or post-launch target adjustment) |
| Seeker | Combined television (TV/CCD) and imaging infrared (ImIR) seeker with automatic tracking |
| Flight speed | 150 m/s (Mach 0.44) |
| Attack speed | 239–250 m/s (Mach 0.70 – Mach 0.73) |
| Range | 3–10 km (1.9–6.2 mi), 25 km (16 mi) with extended range version |
| G load | 15G |

== See also ==
- Anti-tank guided missile

Red Arrow Development

- HJ-8 - wire-guided anti-tank missile system
- HJ-9 - laser command guidance anti-tank missile system
- HJ-12 - man-portable infrared-homing anti-tank missile system

Similar weapons

- ALAS (missile) – (Serbia)
- Polyphem – (France, Germany, Italy)
- Spike-ER – (Israel)
- XM501 Non-Line-of-Sight Launch System – (United States)

Related lists

- List of anti-tank guided missiles
- List of missiles
