= CM-501 =

Chinese missile and loitering munition

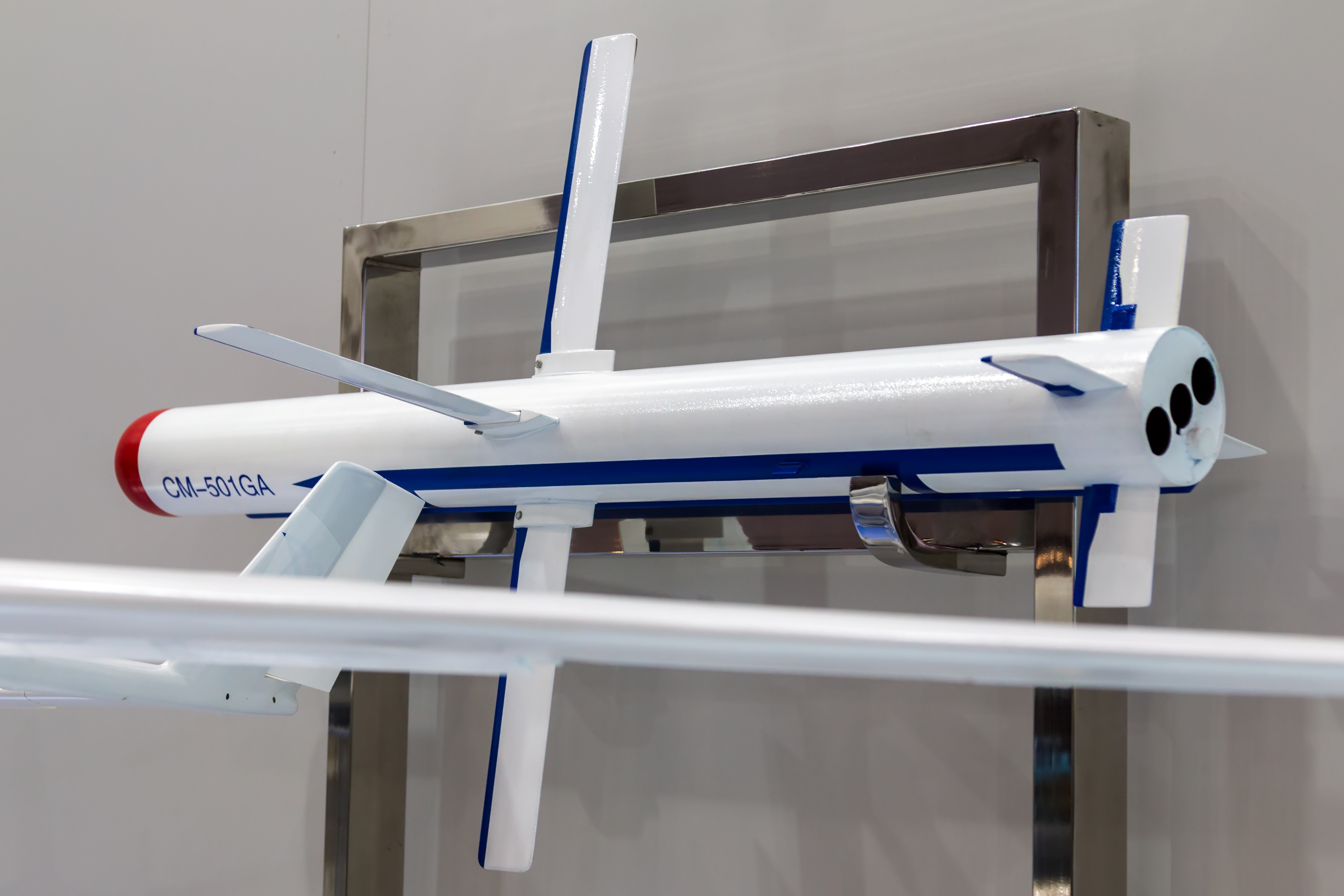
- CM-501GA mockup
- Type: anti-ship, anti-tank, land-attack missile / loitering munition
- Place of origin: China

Service history
- In service: 2019-present
- Used by: People's Liberation Army

Production history
- Manufacturer: China Aerospace Science and Industry Corporation (CASIC)
- Unit cost: depends on models
- Produced: 2010s-present

Specifications
- Mass: CM-501G: 150 kg (330 lb); CM-501GA: 100 kg (220 lb); CM-501X: 170 kg (370 lb); CM-501XA: 100 kg (220 lb); CM-502: 45 kg (99 lb)
- Length: CM-501GA: 2 m (6.6 ft); CM-501X: 3.2 m (10 ft); CM-501XA: 2 m (6.6 ft)
- Warhead: CM-501G: 40 kg (88 lb) HE; CM-501GA: 20 kg (44 lb) HE; CM-501X: 20 kg (44 lb) HE; CM-501XA: 8.5 kg (19 lb) HE; CM-502: 11 kg (24 lb) HE/SAP-HE
- Detonation mechanism: Impact / Proximity / Semi-armor-piercing
- Engine: CM-501G/GA/CM-502: solid-fuel rocket CM-501X/XA: turbojet with rocket booster
- Propellant: solid fuel
- Operational range: CM-501G: 70 km (43 mi); CM-501GA: 40 km (25 mi); CM-501X/XA: 70 km (43 mi); CM-5012: 25 km (16 mi)
- Maximum speed: CM-502: Mach 1.1
- Guidance system: All variant: Datalink + Satellite + INS; CM-501G: Combined IIR, SAL; CM-501GA: Combined IIR, TV; CM-501X/XA: TV / IIR / passive radar / combined IIR with mmW; CM-502: TV/IIR/SAL
- Launch platform: Air-launched, vertical launch system on ground, naval vehicles.

CM-501 is a series of Chinese precision-guided missiles and loitering munitions, first revealed during the 9th Zhuhai Airshow held in November 2012. Developed by China Aerospace Science and Industry Corporation (CASIC), CM-501 can be launched from ground, surface ship, and air platforms upon customers' requests.

== Design ==
=== CM-501G ===
The CM-501G is a non-line-of-sight missile system capable of fire-and-forget launch and man-in-the-loop (HITL) with lock-on-after-launch (LOAL) adjustments. The CM-501G weighs around 150 kg (330 lb) and has a range of more than 70 km (43 mi), and a warhead 40 kg (88 lb). The missile is steered by two sets of cruciform control fins. The CM-501G has a combined imaging infrared (IIR), semi-active laser homing (SAL) seeker head for terminal guidance, and supporting satellite navigation, inertial guidance system (INS) for flight navigation. A two-way data link is fitted, allowing in-flight route update and re-targeting if needed.

The CM-501G launch system is mounted on the Shaanxi SX2190 truck, with two launcher boxes each containing nine missiles in a 3x3 configuration, for a total of 18 missiles. The launchers' elevation and traverse mechanisms are similar to those of Type 89 rocket system. The command vehicle can use other chassis, such as Dongfeng EQ2050. The operator sits in the command vehicle mounted on the same chassis, handling targeting identification, engagement, and re-targeting via a two-way data link. The system also supports 'networked engagement', allowing the missile to be retasked by command posts, forward observers, and all types of friendly units within the data network.

For export customers requesting low-cost options, the modular missile design allows simplification in seeker choice. The imaging infrared seeker head can be replaced by a simple satellite targeting system or semi-active laser homing (SAL) only system. The datalink is also optional, and can be removed to lower the price.

=== CM-501GA ===
The CM-501GA is the lightweight variant of the CM-501G. The new system is mounted on a lightweight CTL-181A Mengshi 6x6 MRAP truck chassis, consisting of one radar command vehicle and one launcher vehicle, with each launch vehicle having a 12-cell, box-shaped launcher unit. The missile weighs 100 kg (220 lb) and has a high-explosive warhead of 20 kg (44 lb), a diameter of 180 mm (7.1 in), a length of 2 m (6.6 ft), and a range of 5–40 km (3.1–24.9 mi).

The CM-501GA is powered by a solid-fuel rocket motor and steered by two sets of cruciform control fins. The seeker is a combined Television (TV)/imaging infrared (IIR) terminal seeker, INS/Satellite guidance for mid-flight guidance, and two-way datalink for target adjustment. The seeker can target fixed structures and slow-moving tanks, ships, and air targets. For the fixed target, the reported CEP is ≤1m.

=== CM-501X/XA ===
The CM-501X and CM-501XA are loitering munitions with a cylindrical seeker head and a square prism body.

The CM-501X has a weight of 170 kg (370 lb), a high-explosive warhead of 20 kg (44 lb), a length of less than 3.2 m (10 ft), a range of 70 km (43 mi), and an endurance of 50 minutes. The navigation guidance is combined INS and satellite, with a modular seeker head option including TV, infrared, passive radar, and a combined infrared imaging (IIR) with millimeter-wave seeker. The propulsion is a turbojet with a rocket booster.

The CM-501XA has a weight of 100 kg (220 lb), a high-explosive warhead of 8.5 kg (19 lb), a length of 2 m (6.6 ft), a cross-section of 230 mm × 230 mm (9.1 in × 9.1 in), a range of 70 km (43 mi), and an endurance of 30 minutes.

The CM-501 loitering munitions are powered by a turbojet.

=== CM-502 ===
The CM-502 is a lightweight variant of the CM-501 series. It can target fixed and slow-moving targets, including structures, armored vehicles, tanks, surface vessels, helicopters, and drones.

The CM-502KG was debuted at the 9th Zhuhai Airshow in November 2012 by CASIC. CM-502KG has a mass of 45 kg (99 lb), a warhead of 11 kg (24 lb), top-attack trajectory, a penetration value of 1,000 mm (39 in), a maximum speed of Mach 1.1, and a range of up to 25 km (16 mi). The missile has four chopped control fins, an imaging seeker, two-way data-links, and fire-and-forget capability. A total of 16 CM-502KG can be mounted on the Z-10 helicopter at once.

== Variant ==
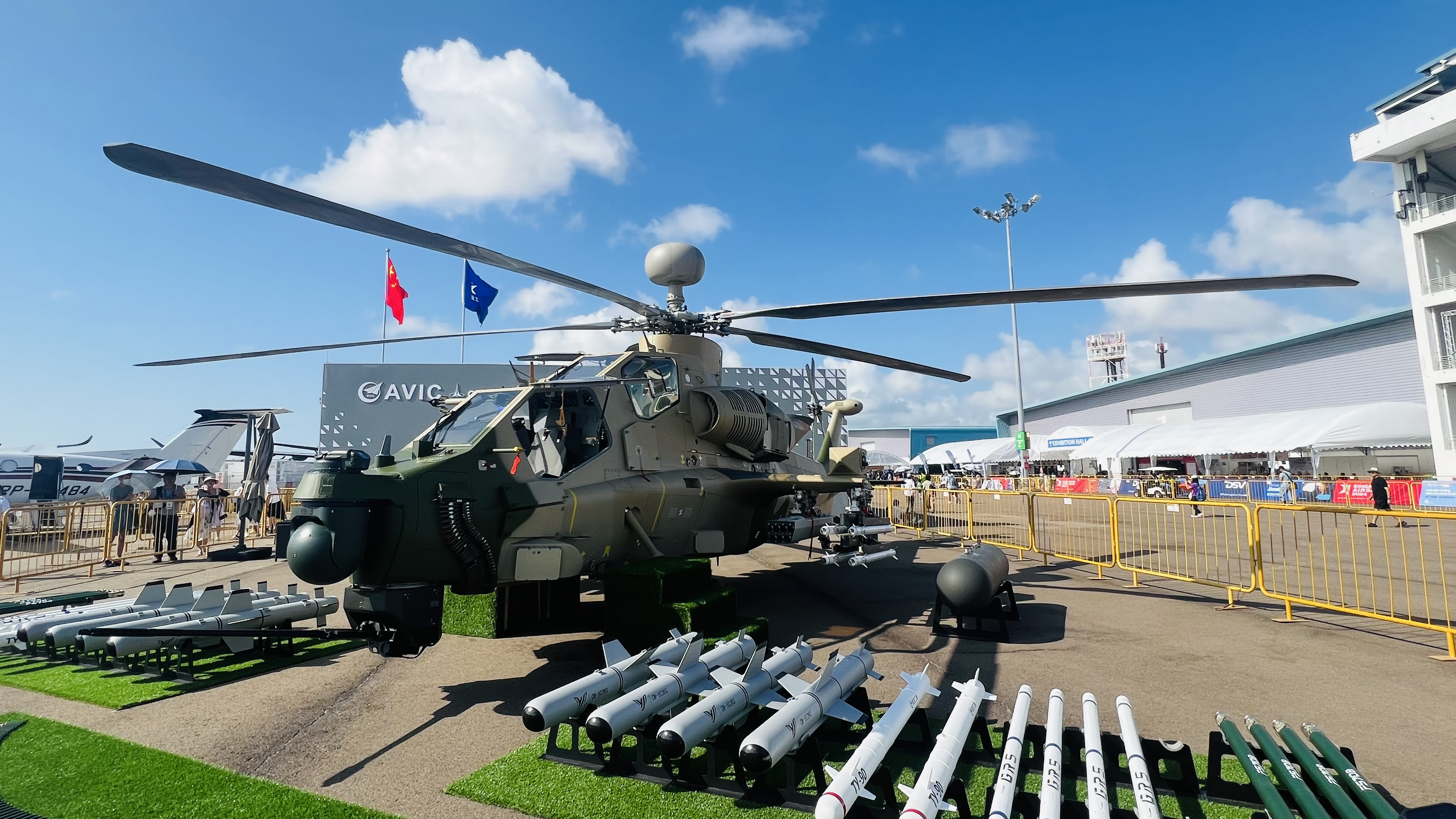
CM-502KG (bottom-center) showcased in front of the Changhe Z-10 helicopter.

CM-501G
None-line-of-sight anti-tank missile. Land-based with 70 km range. Four folding control stabilizing fins.
CM-501GA
None-line-of-sight anti-tank missile. Lighter version mounted on light vehicles, small ships, and helicopters with 40 km range. Four folding rectangle control fins.
CM-501X
Loitering Munition. The control range is 70 km, while the endurance time is 50 minutes.
CM-501XA
Loitering Munition. The suicide drone will stand by in the air after launch, and can engage multiple enemy target autonomously, Control range is 70 km, while the operational time is 30 minutes.
CM-502
None-line-of-sight multipurpose missile. Light version of CM-501GA with 25 km (16 mi) range.
CM-502KG
None-line-of-sight multipurpose air-to-surface missile. Four folding rectangle control fins.
CM-506KG
Air-to-surface guided bomb debuted at Zhuhai Airshow 2012. It's a small-diameter bomb that weighs 150 kg (330 lb) and has a maximum range of 130 km (70 nmi). The default guidance mode is inertial navigation and satellite guidance. Optional seeker heads include TV guidance, IR, millimeter wave radar, and laser designation. Comparable to the GBU-53/B StormBreaker SDB II.

== Operators ==
- China
  - People's Liberation Army Ground Force: CM-501GA, CM-501XA vertical launch system based on CSK-181 chassis; CM-501GA, CM-501X, CM-502 on helictopers.
- Pakistan
  - Pakistan Army: CM-502KG.
  - Pakistan Navy
- Turkmenistan
  - Turkmen Ground Forces: CM-502KG.

== See also ==
- ALAS – (Serbia)
- FOG-MPM – (Brazil)
- MGM-157 EFOGM – (United States)
- XM501 non-line-of-sight launch system – (United States) (Netfires)
- IAI JUMPER – (Israel)
- Type 96 multi-purpose missile system – (Japan)
- AGM-179 – (United States)
- AG-300 – (China)
