= Surface-to-surface missile =

Missile type

A surface-to-surface missile (SSM) is a missile designed to be launched from the ground or the sea and strike targets on land or at sea. They may be fired from hand-held or vehicle mounted devices, from fixed installations, or from a ship. They are often powered by a rocket engine or sometimes fired by an explosive charge, since the launching platform is typically stationary or moving slowly. They usually have fins and/or wings for lift and stability, although hyper-velocity or short-ranged missiles may use body lift or fly a ballistic trajectory. The first operational surface-to-surface missile was the V-1 flying bomb, which was powered by a pulsejet engine.

Contemporary surface-to-surface missiles are usually guided. An unguided surface-to-surface missile is usually referred to as a rocket (for example, an RPG-7 or M72 LAW is an anti-tank rocket), whereas a BGM-71 TOW or AT-2 Swatter is an anti-tank guided missile.

Examples of surface-to-surface missile include the MGM-140 ATACMS and the Scud family of missiles.

== Examples ==
- 3M-54 Kalibr
- 9K720 Iskander
- ALAS
- BGM-109 Tomahawk
- Bina
- BrahMos
- Hermes
- Hyunmoo-3
- KARA Atmaca
- Kh-35
- Long-Range Hypersonic Weapon (LRHW)
- Luz
- Martlet
- MGM-140 ATACMS
- Nimrod
- Nirbhay
- Otomat
- P-800 Oniks
- PARS 3 LR
- Polyphem
- Prahaar
- Pralay
- RBS-15
- Sea Breaker
- Shaurya
- Ure

== Types ==
There are a wide variety of surface-to-surface missiles. They can be categorized by their intended usage, intended target (such as anti-ship), flight profile, and launch platform. These categorizations often overlap. These types of missiles may be launched from fixed silos, road-mobile vehicle, railcar, or naval launch platforms.

Cruise missiles travel at lower speeds and trajectories (often a few meters above ground), always within the atmosphere, and their motor burns during the entire flight. Ballistic missiles travel at higher speeds and trajectories with a short powered flight (boost phase) followed by a period of typically unpowered flight often exiting the atmosphere (midcourse phase), followed by a high speed unpowered terminal re-entry. They are typically classified by range band, from shortest to longest:

- Short-range ballistic missile (SRBM): Range less than 1,000 km.
- Medium-range ballistic missile (MRBM): Range between 1,000 km and 3,000 km.
- Intermediate-range ballistic missile (IRBM): Range between 3,000 km and 5,500 km.
- Intercontinental ballistic missile (ICBM): Range greater than 5,500 km.
