= HJ-8 =

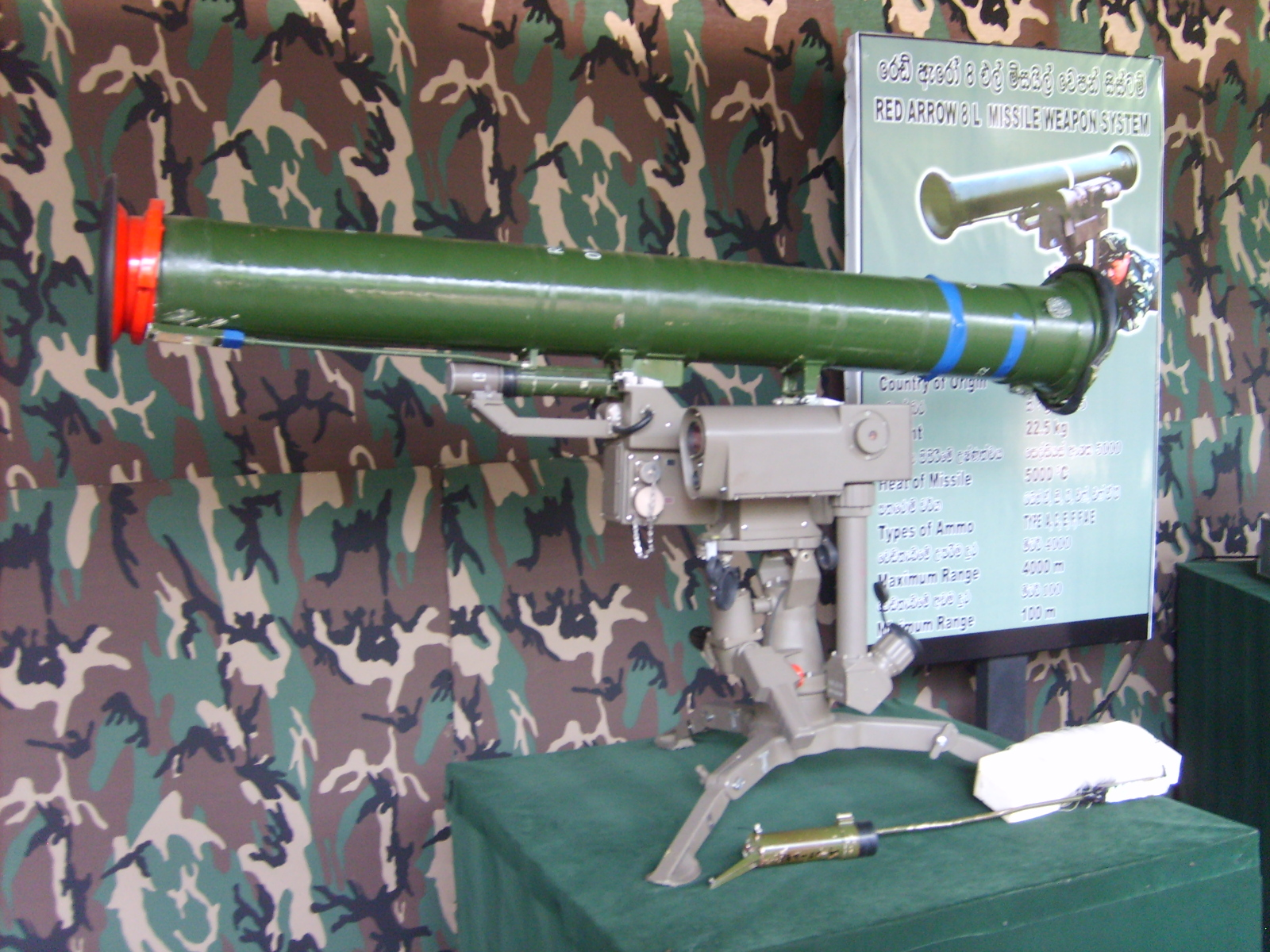
- The HJ-8L on display
- Type: Anti-tank missile
- Place of origin: China

Service history
- In service: 1985–present
- Used by: See Operators
- Wars: Yugoslav Wars; Sri Lankan Civil War; Sudanese conflict in South Kordofan and Blue Nile; Syrian Civil War; War in Iraq (2013-17); India–Pakistan border skirmishes War in Sudan (2023–present); Gaza war

Production history
- Designer: Research Institute 203
- Designed: 1970–1984
- Manufacturer: NORINCO (Factory 282, Factory 5618); GIDS (Pakistan)
- Produced: 1984–present
- Variants: see variants

Specifications
- Mass: 250 kg
- Length: 1,566 mm
- Diameter: 120 mm
- Wingspan: 320 mm
- Effective firing range: 0.1–4 km
- Warhead: HEAT
- Engine: Solid-fuel rocket
- Maximum speed: 220 m/s
- Guidance system: SACLOS wire guidance
- Launch platform: Tripod, vehicle, aircraft

The HJ-8 or Hongjian-8 (Chinese: 红箭-8; pinyin: Hóng Jiàn-8; lit. 'Red Arrow-8') is a second generation tube-launched, optically tracked, wire-guided anti-tank missile system which was originally deployed by the People's Liberation Army in the late 1980s.

== Development ==
In 1970, China's armored corps first proposed to develop a successor to HJ-73 and this was later approved, designated as the AFT-8 or HJ-8. The missile was jointly developed by Research Institute 203 and 282nd Factory, but the program was interrupted by political turmoil. The key designers were Wang Xingzhi (王兴治) and Zhao Jiazheng (赵家铮), who developed the missile. Development was not completed until the early 1980s, after the end of the Cultural Revolution. After receiving state certification, the missile entered mass production in 1984. HJ-8 is an optically tracked, wire guided ATGM.

HJ-8 and its variants are manufactured by NORINCO's Factory 282 (Jiangnan Machine Factory—江南机器厂), Factory 5618 (Hunan South China Photoelectricity Instrument Plant—湖南华南光电仪器厂) of China and Khan Research Laboratories of Pakistan, now by GIDS.

== Design ==
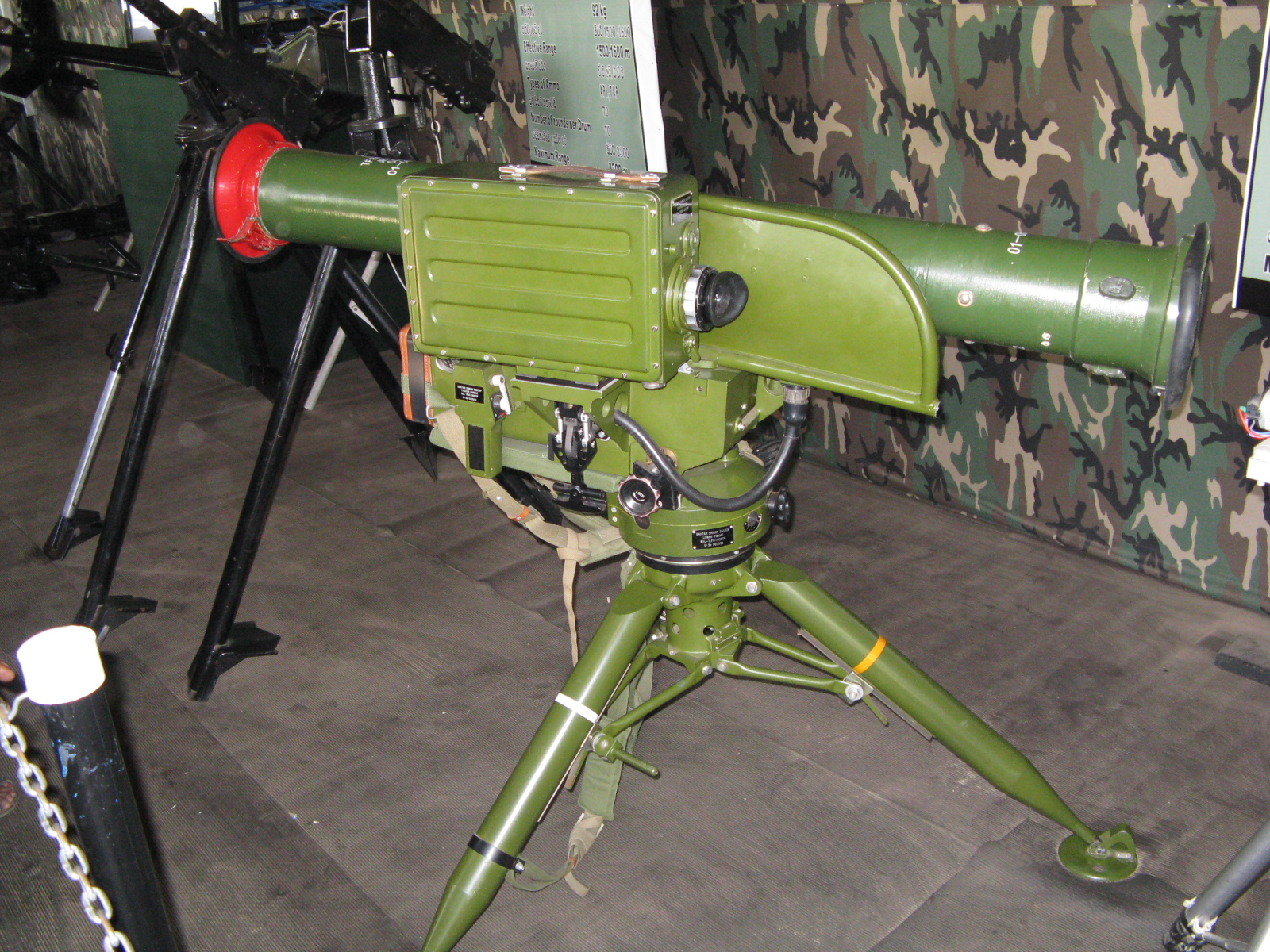
HJ-8 of the Sri Lankan Army.

The HJ-8 series is China's first indigenous anti-tank missile design and it can be considered an equivalent of the US BGM-71 TOW and Franco-German MILAN / Euromissile HOT anti-tank missiles. HJ-8 is a tube-launched, optically tracked and wire-guided missile system armed with a HEAT anti-tank warhead. The HJ-8 is a combination many experts believe of three Western antitank missile systems obtained from nations in the Middle East and Asia that were then examined, reverse engineered and modified: the tripod from the US BGM-71 TOW; the tracker-control unit from the French/German MILAN; and the missile from the UK Swingfire.

There are numerous improved models following the original HJ-8, designated HJ-8A to HJ-8H, each incorporating improved features over the previous model. HJ-8E entered service in mid-1990. The HJ-8E anti-tank missile weighs 24.5 kg, has a range of up to 4,000 m, and can also defeat explosive reactive armour (ERA). It can penetrate 800–1100 mm of RHA at 0° incidence / 180+ mm RHA at 68° incidence.

Designed to be both dependable and accurate, HJ-8 is now the standard anti-tank armament of the Z-9W, Mi-17, and Gazelle (replacing the original Euromissile HOT first carried) helicopter gunships of the PLA.

== Combat use ==
=== Bosnia and Herzegovina ===
The Baktar-Shikan variant of HJ-8 were supplied to Bosnian government forces by Pakistan in early 1993. It was used by Bosniak army forces against Serb forces tanks during the 1993 offensive, helping them destroy Serb tanks.

=== Sri Lanka ===
The Sri Lanka Army acquired HJ-8 from China during the civil conflict against the separatist Liberation Tigers of Tamil Eelam (LTTE). They were mostly used to destroy LTTE structures, including bunkers.

On at least one occasion during the 2009 Battle of Mullaitivu, the Sri Lankan Army used these weapons against fast attack craft of the Sea Tigers, the LTTE's naval wing.

=== Syria ===
Since June 2013, videos showing the use of the HJ-8 by Free Syrian Army rebels against Syrian Arab Army armor have surfaced and have been successful in destroying T-72 tanks.

=== Iraq ===
Since December 2014, videos showing the use of the HJ-8 by the Peshmerga against Islamic State (ISIL) have surfaced. The HJ-8 systems might have been captured from ISIL stockpiles. The HJ-8 may have been responsible for the destruction of an Iraqi Army M1 Abrams tank by the Peshmerga in the Battle Of Altun Kupri.

=== Pakistan ===
The Bhaktar Shikan variant of the HJ-8 made by Pakistan has been used in large numbers against TTP insurgents during Operation Zarb-e-Azb where it was mainly used to destroy hideouts and caves where the insurgents would usually hide. Its use in the Line of Control was reported against Indian Army bunkers and checkposts on the Line of Control during border skirmishes.

=== Gaza Strip ===
On June 24, 2024, Izz Adin al-Qassam Brigades published footage of its forces targeting an Israeli Defence Force Namer APC engineering variant equipped with a CARPET thermobaric demining system using an HJ-8, which directly hit the vehicle from the rear and set off an exterior fire which then spread inside. This is the first documented use of this weapon by Al-Qassam Brigades, although other Chinese weapons have reportedly previously been used in the Strip.

On August 1, 2024, Izz Adin al-Qassam Brigades published a second footage of its operatives targeting an Israeli Namer APC hitting it from the side, successfully bypassing the Trophy APS that was present on the vehicle.

== Variants ==
Launchers:

- HJ-8 – The original version. Claimed to be able to achieve a kill probability of 90%
- HJ-8A – First upgrade of HJ-8 with greater penetration power, slightly larger than HJ-8, with range increased to 4 km.
- HJ-8B – A HJ-8 model specifically developed for helicopters, with greater penetration power and range increased to 5.3 km.
- HJ-8C – Specifically developed to defeat explosive reactive armour with a tandem-charge. From HJ-8C onward, all HJ-8 missiles can be carried by various platforms.
- HJ-8D – Upgraded variant with tandem charge.
- HJ-8E – Upgrade of HJ-8B/C with a new rocket motor with a range of up to 4 km, entered service in mid-1990. Fire-control system (FCS) is highly digitized and includes a thermal imaging system for all-weather day-night capability. The HJ-8E anti-tank missile weighs 24.5 kg, has a range of up to 4,000 m, can also defeat explosive reactive armour (ERA).
- HJ-8F – Variant with an anti bunker warhead.
- HJ-8FAE – Version featuring a thermobaric warhead.
- HJ-8L – A model with reduced overall weight, L meaning "light". Using feedback from the Bosnian War, HJ-8E was designed to meet the need of a lightweight ATGM that is just as capable as heavier models. HJ-8L can accommodate two missiles, one smaller with 3 km range and one larger with 4 km range. New microelectronics are used in the fire-control system and use of composite materials in the launching/storage system reduce weight to 22.5 kg, so that HJ-8L can be carried by a crew of two.
- HJ-8H – Upgraded HJ-8E; adopting the same fire-control system and lightweight launching/storage system of HJ-8L. Uses a new missile, capable of engaging ground targets 6 km away and low speed aerial targets such as helicopters 4 km away.
- HJ-8S – Variant with an anti ship warhead.
- Baktar-Shikan – Baktar-Shikan (Urdu: بکتر شکن "Armour Piercing") is a variant of HJ-8 that has been manufactured under license by Pakistan at Khan Research Laboratories. The missile and launch system can be quickly disassembled into four sub-units, each weighing less than 25 kg, making the system crew-portable. Baktar-Shikan is also mounted on Pakistani armoured personnel carriers (APCs) and a modified air-launched variant is used to arm the AH-1 Cobra helicopter gunships and other helicopters of the Pakistan Army Aviation wing. Baktar-Shikan has been exported to Bangladesh and Malaysia. A multi-launcher station for four Baktar-Shikan tubes was displayed by GIDS in 2016. An optional laser aiming device is also under development to increase accuracy at longer ranges. According to SIPRI, between 1990 and 2024, Pakistan has produced 27,350 Baktar-Shikans.
- HJ-11 (AFT-11): The designation was revealed in 2014, with public display in 2017. The missile is a development of HJ-8 with semi-active laser guidance and laser beam riding. The missile served as a low-cost alternative to the more expensive HJ-12 missile system. It received a new designation HJ-11 and was marketed as a third-generation anti-tank missile by Norinco. Chinese state media reported that missile entered service in 2018.

Mounted Platforms:

- BJ212 HJ-8: HJ-8 launcher mounted on a Beijing BJ212 as a mobile anti-tank platform.
- BJ2020 HJ-8E: HJ-8E launcher mounted on a Beijing BJ2020 as a mobile anti-tank platform.
- CSK-181 AFT-11 Carrier: AFT-11 (HJ-11) launcher mounted on a CSK-181 MRAP assault vehicle.

== Operators ==
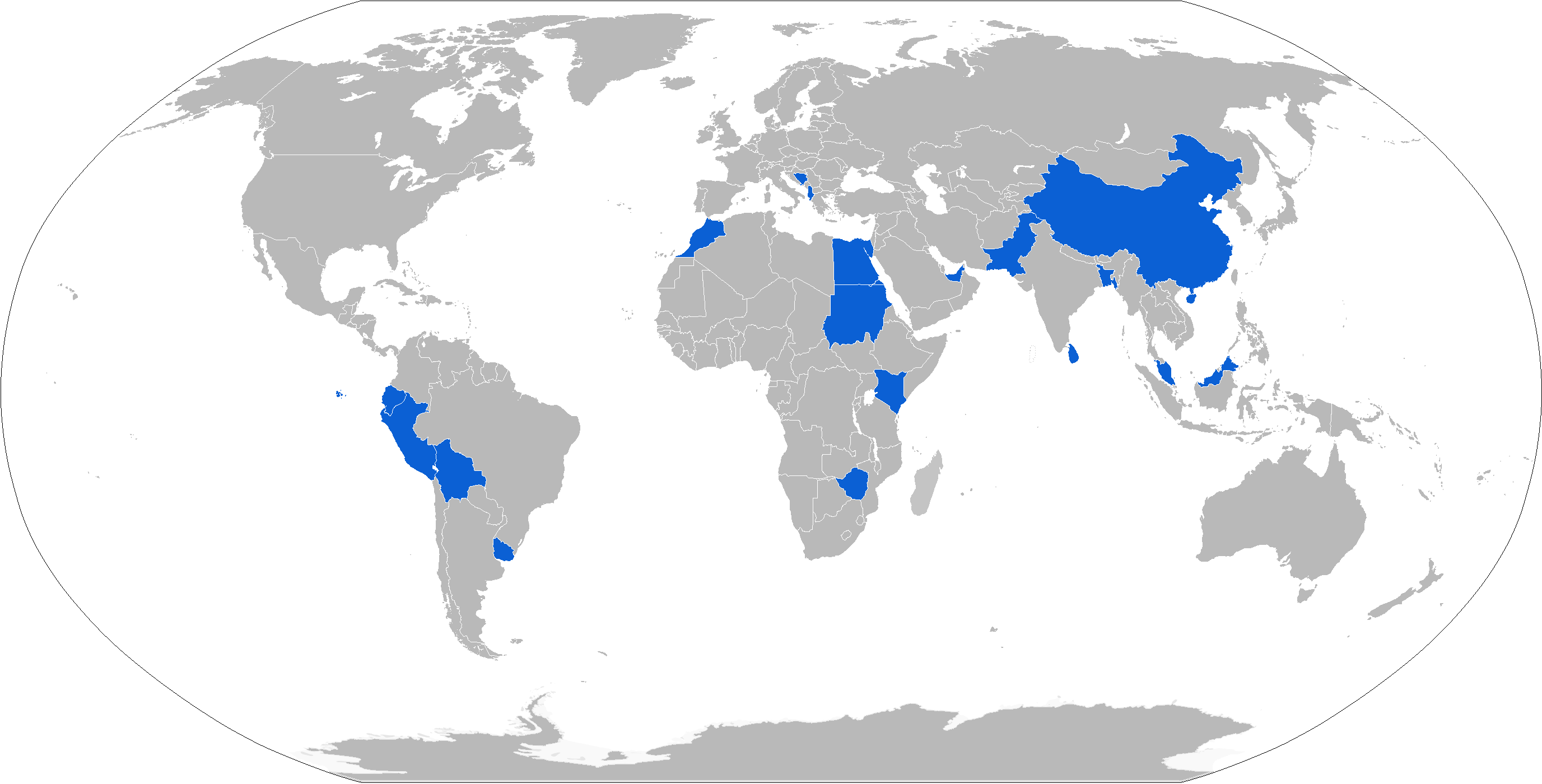
Map with HJ-8 operators in blue

- Albania
- Bangladesh – Ordered in 2000, 114 delivered in 2001. 172 Baktar-Shikan variant delivered from Pakistan in 2004–2005.
- Bolivia: 500 HJ-8s delivered to Bolivia in 2003.
- Bosnia and Herzegovina: Donated by Pakistan during the Yugoslav Wars
- Cameroon: 367
- China: 264
- Egypt
- Ecuador
- Kurdistan: Peshmerga
- Kenya
- Malaysia: 450 in inventory.
- Morocco – HJ-8L: 367
- Pakistan: Produced locally under license as the Baktar-Shikan. According to SIPRI, 26,350 produced between 1990 and 2022.
- Qatar:
- Peru
- Sri Lanka:
- Sudan – Made under license as the Sarib by Military Industries Corporation. Some Chinese-made captured by Sudan People's Liberation Movement-North.
- Syria – Different Syrian insurgent factions in the Syrian civil war. Also captured by the Syrian Army. Externally supplied.
- United Arab Emirates
- Uruguay
- Venezuela
- Zimbabwe

=== Non-State actors ===
- United Wa State Army
- (Palestine) Izz adin Al-Qassam Brigades
- Islamic State

== Gallery ==
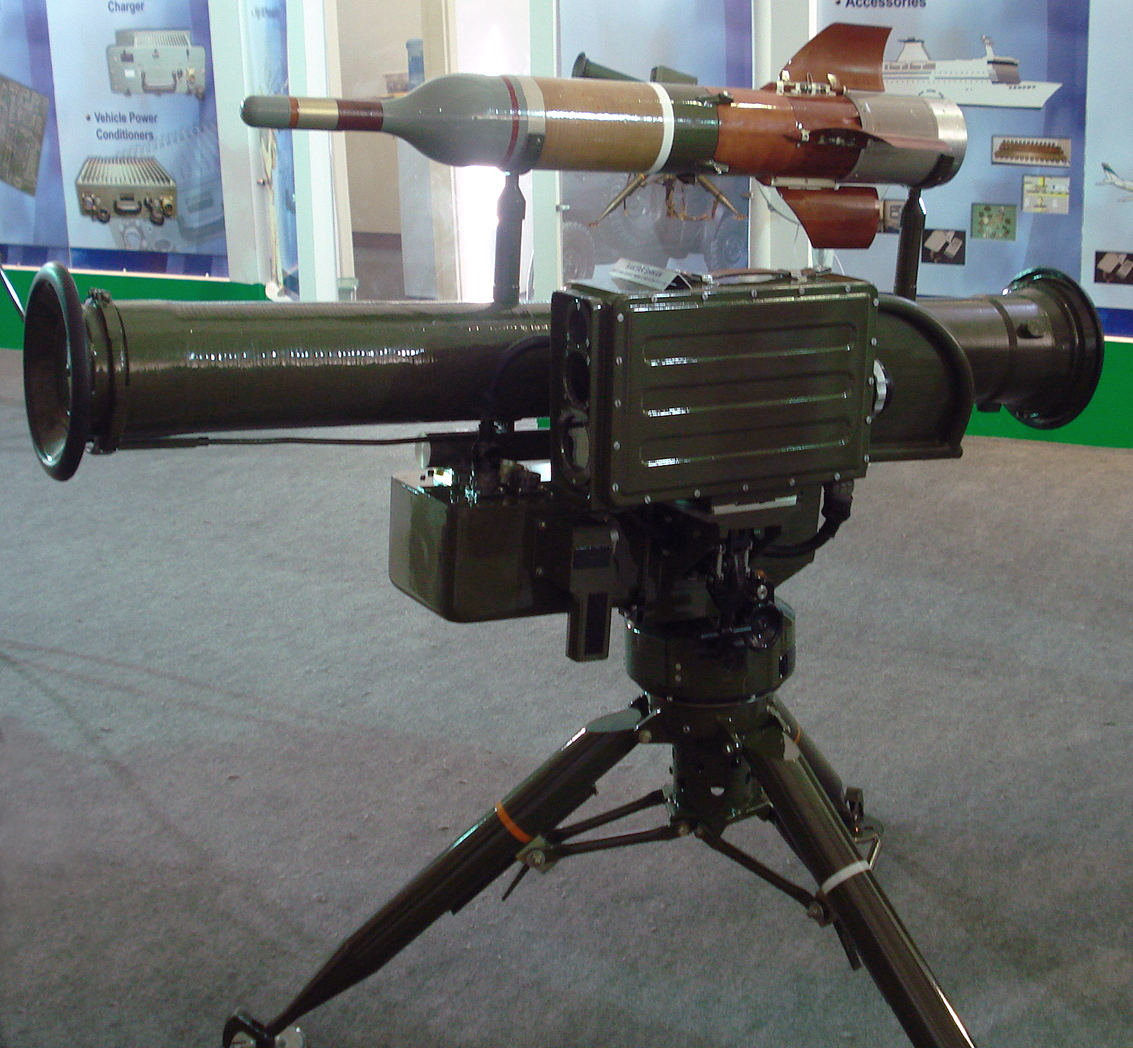
Baktar Shikan on display.

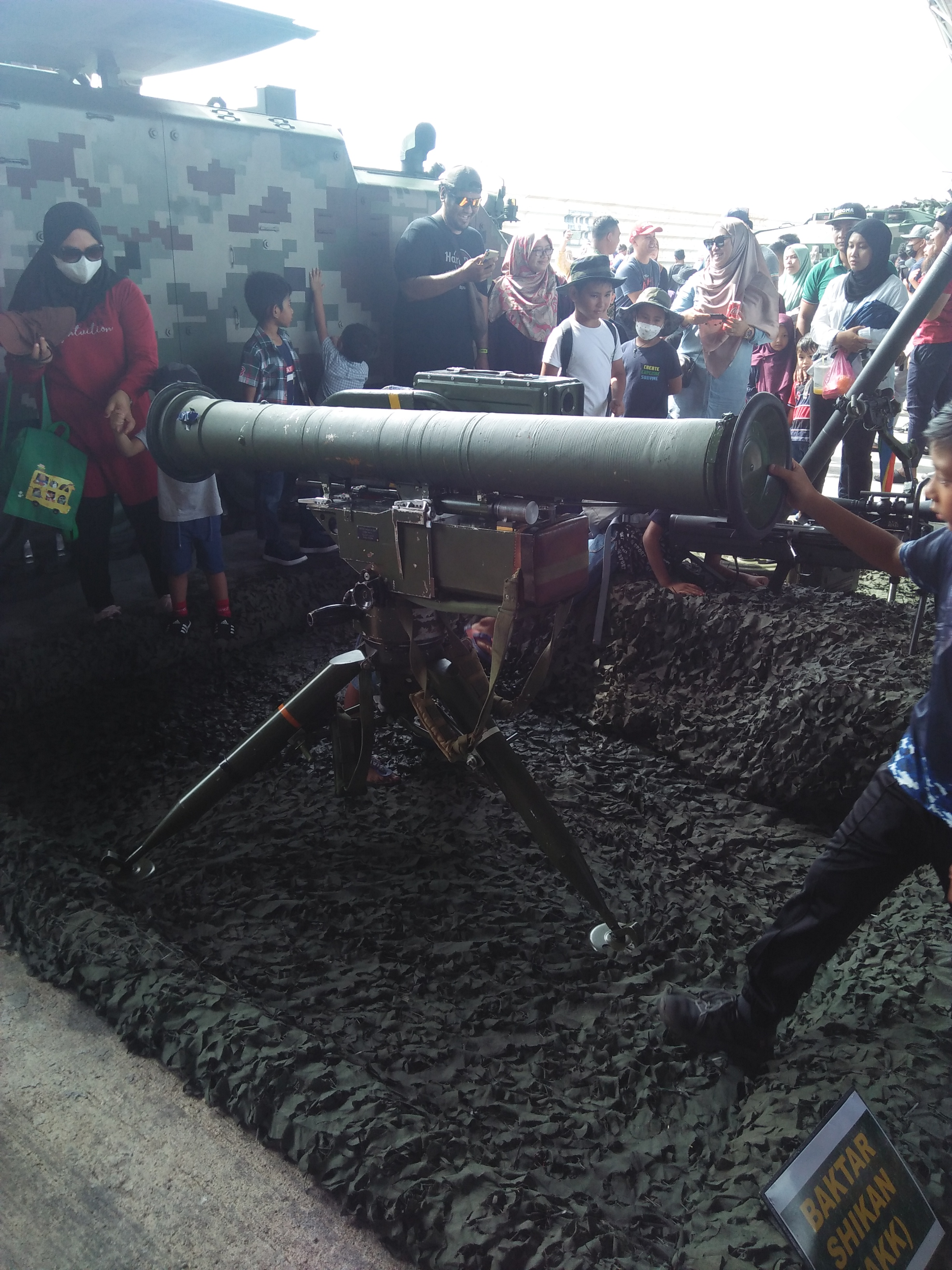
Baktar Shikan of Malaysian Army on display.

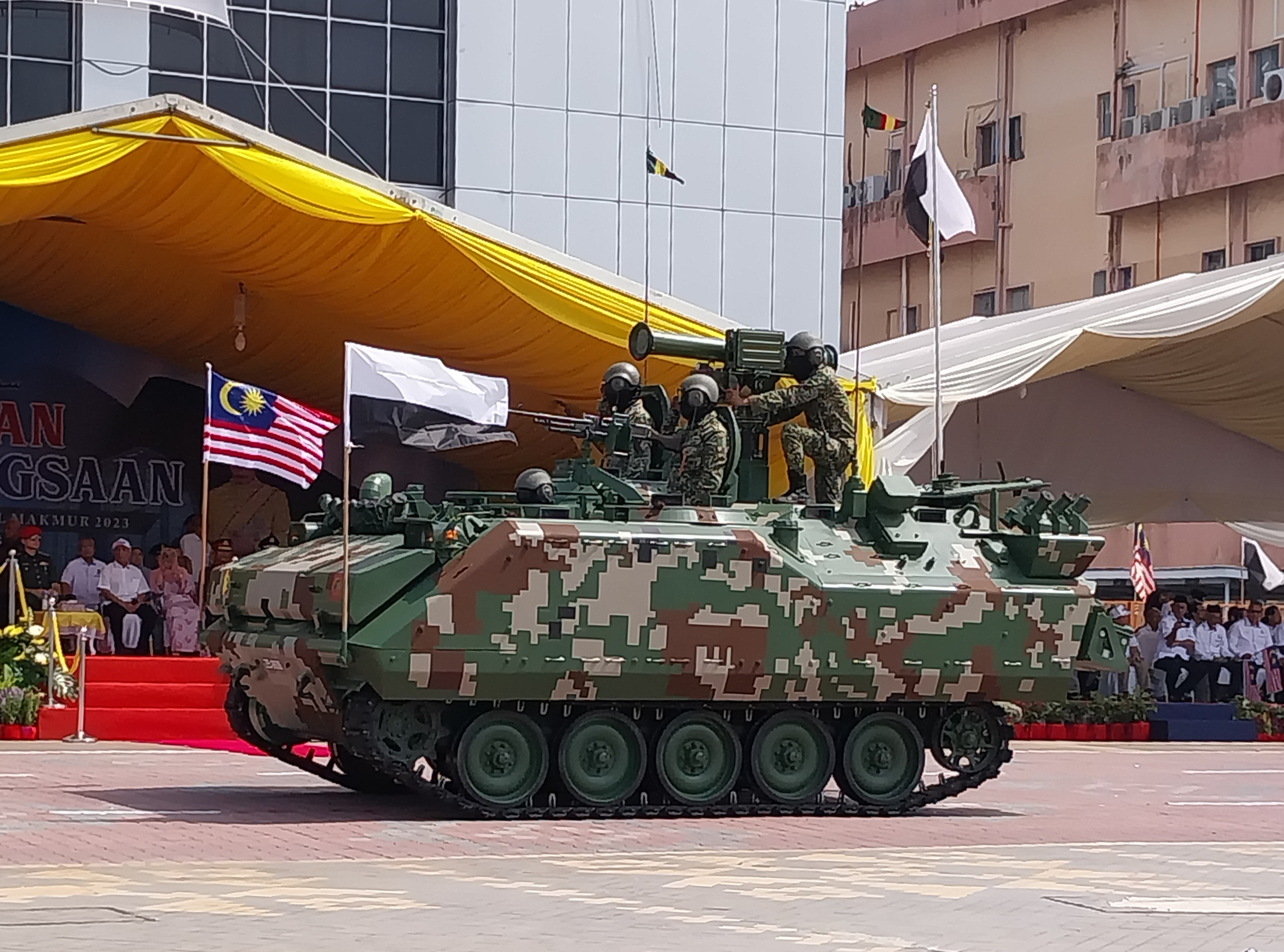
Baktar Shikan mounted on ACV-300 Adnan during parade.

== See also ==
Related development

- HJ-9
- HJ-10
- HJ-12

Similar weapons

- 9K111 Fagot – (Soviet Union)
- 9M113 Konkurs – (Soviet Union)
- BGM-71 TOW – (United States)
- MILAN – (France, West Germany)
- Karaok – (Turkey)

Related lists

- List of anti-tank guided missiles
- List of missiles
