= MGM-157 EFOGM =

Missile formerly used by the US Army

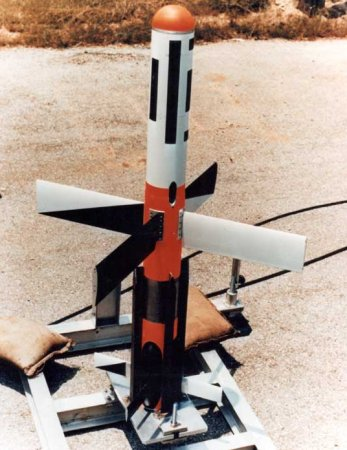
YMGM-157B

The Raytheon MGM-157 EFOGM (Enhanced Fiber Optic Guided Missile) was a long-range enhanced fiber optic guided missile developed by Raytheon for the United States Army during the 1980s and 1990s to test the use of fiber optics in missiles. The missile was launched vertically and manually controlled by an operator on the ground by use of a television camera mounted on the nose. The signals from the camera were carried via a thin wire that unspooled the further up the missile reached. The weapon was primarily designed for anti-tank use, or against low flying helicopters. The EFOGM was cancelled in 2002.

== See also ==
- ALAS – (Serbia)
- CM-501G – (China)
- FOG-MPM – (Brazil)
- XM501 non-line-of-sight launch system – (United States)
- Polyphem – (France, Germany, Italy)
- Type 96 multi-purpose missile system – (Japan)
