= FAW MV3 =

Family of tactical trucks used by the Chinese military

First Automobile Works (FAW) MV3
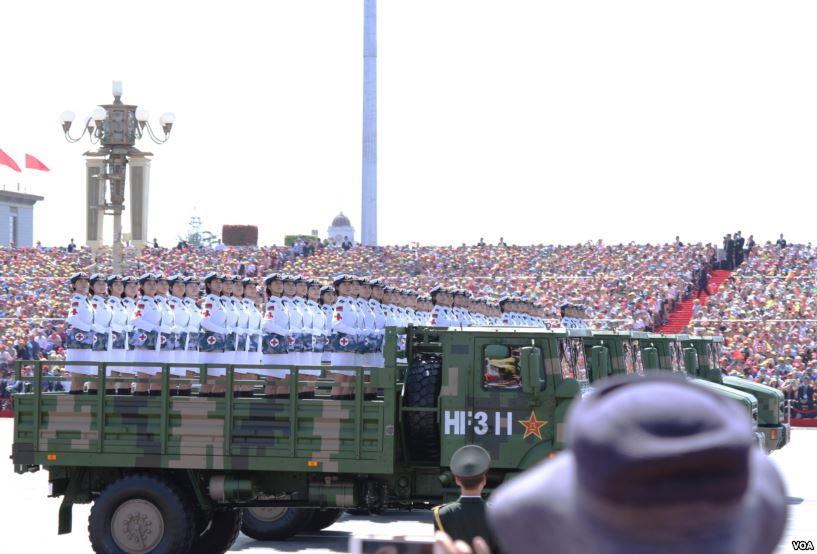
- MV3 (CTM-134) carrying Medical Phalanx at 2015 China Victory Day Parade
- Type: Family of 4×4 and 6×6 tactical trucks with 3.5-ton and 5-ton payload.
- Place of origin: China

Service history
- In service: From 2011
- Used by: People's Liberation Army

Production history
- Manufacturer: FAW Group
- Produced: 2011
- Variants: 6x6

Specifications
- Mass: 5 t (empty); 10 t (max payload)
- Crew: 1+1 / 1+3
- Engine: diesel engine 350 hp (260 kW)
- Payload capacity: 3.5–5 tonnes (3,500–5,000 kg) (cross-country); 7–10 tonnes (7,000–10,000 kg) (road-mobile)
- Suspension: Wheel 6x6
- Operational range: 1000 km
- Maximum speed: 60 mph (97 km/h)

The FAW MV3 is the third generation military truck developed by First Automobile Works (FAW). Since 2011, FAW MV3 is the standardized military truck used widely by the Chinese People's Liberation Army. The utility truck has two configurations, 4x4 and more commonly 6x6, both featuring cross-country mobility. The truck also comes with options on single or double armored cabs. It is the Chinese equivalent of US Army M939 and MTVR.

The development of the MV3 finished in 2011 and won the Army endorsement from a competition in 2011 against three other state-owned military vehicle manufacturing corporation. MV3 will be the next generation universal transport/cargo truck, replacing Dongfeng EQ240/EQ2081 and Dongfeng EQ245/EQ2100.

== Variants ==
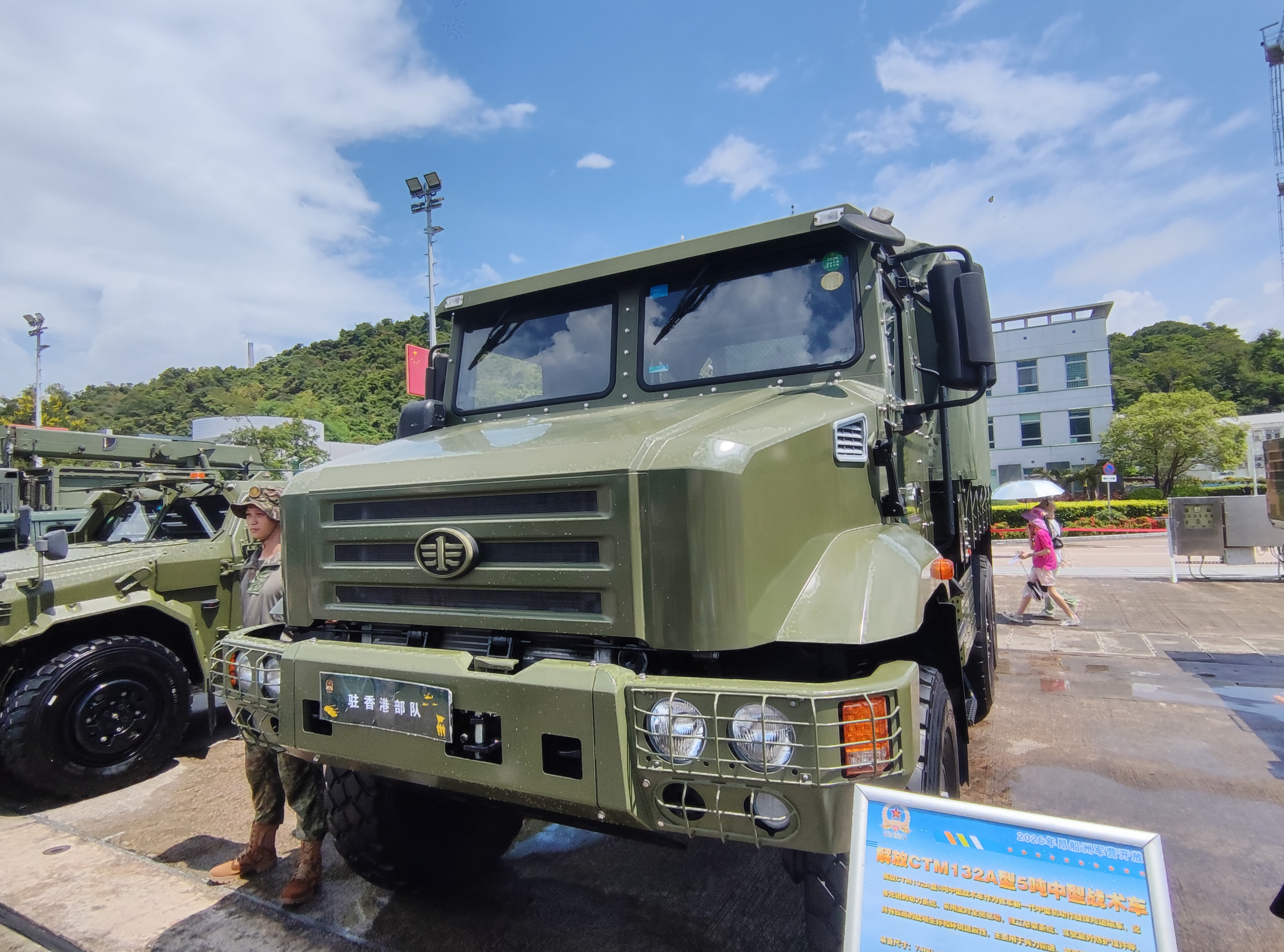
CTM-132A of the PLA Ground Force

CTM-131
Chinese military designation. A 6x6 configuration with double cab. A 5 ton payload capacity.
CTM-132
Chinese military designation. A 6x6 configuration with single cab. A 5 ton payload capacity.
CTM-133
Chinese military designation. A 4x4 configuration with double cab. A 3.5 ton payload capacity.
CTM-134
Chinese military designation. A 4x4 configuration with single cab. A 3.5 ton payload capacity.
PCL-161
A 122 mm truck-mounted howitzer (self-propelled howitzer, SPH) capable of rapid deployment, based on CTM-133 chassis.
PHL-21
Modular multiple launch rocket system based on CTM-133 chassis.
AFT-10 Carrier
Two HJ-10 missiles and electro-optical sensor fitted on CTM-133 chassis.
MV3 MRAP
Border patrol vehicle with reinforced armor and protection against improvised explosive devices (IED).
MV3 Armored Cabin
MV3-based transport vehicle with integrated armored cabin, replacing open-top troop carrier with canvas covers. The cabin features side-facing suspended seats and houses 22 infantry, designed to improve comfort in harsh operating environments.
MV3 All-Terrian Fire Engine
Firefighting modification with off-road capabilities.
