= Bulsae-4 =

North Korean anti-tank guided missile

- Type: Anti-tank guided missile
- Place of origin: North Korea

Service history
- Used by: North Korea; Russia
- Wars: Russo-Ukrainian war

Production history
- Designed: 2010 (combat vehicle); 2018 (missile)
- Manufacturer: North Korea

Specifications
- Operational range: 10–25 km (6.2–15.5 mi)
- Guidance system: Electro-optical seeker combined with command guidance
- Launch platform: Armoured launcher Pickup truck launcher

The Bulsae-4 (Note: Western analysts has called Bulsae-4 as Spike Kim, a mocking nickname for this missile.) (Korean: 불새-4; lit. 'Phoenix-4') is a North Korean anti-tank guided missile.

It is considered to be the "most advanced anti-tank weapon systems in the world", according to North Korean state media.

== Design ==
The Bulsae-4 bears external similarities to Israel's Spike and also possesses technological features similar to United States's FGM-148 Javelin and China's HJ-10. It features non-line-of-sight (NLOS) attack capability, allowing Bulsae-4 to be used from cover. However, it relies on reconnaissance drones to spot targets. Bulsae-4 uses electro-optical seeker combined with command guidance, allowing the missile to be controlled using video signal, optical cable or radio connection. Its range is estimated to be 10–25 km (6.2–15.5 mi).

Bulsae-4 is designed as a module weapon system that can be mounted on a 6x6 armoured vehicle, or a six-tube pickup truck chassis. A shoulder-mounted variant is also under development. The 6x6 wheeled combat vehicle is based on the M-2010 armored personnel carrier, estimated to be 7.65 m (25.1 ft) long and 2.9 m (9 ft 6 in) wide. It can accommodate up to eight missile tubes.

According to North Korea, the Bulsae-4, which is officially called "tactical guided weapon", has sufficient military value to replace multiple rocket launchers. It is planned to be deployed within key military units in the Korean People's Army starting from the first half of 2026.

== History ==
The combat vehicle of Bulsae-4 was introduced in 2010. Around 2018, the missile was introduced. Since then, Bulsae-4 has been displayed in military parades and exhibitions.

=== Mass production ===
It was reported that Bulsae-4 has entered mass production. During an inspection to a munition factory on 3 January 2026, North Korean leader Kim Jong Un ordered to expanded production of Bulsae-4 by 2.5 times.

=== Russian use ===
The Bulsae-4 was reported to be used by Russian forces during Russo-Ukrainian war, as it was retrieved from the battlefield by Ukrainian intelligence in late 2024. In August 2024, it was first spotted in Ukraine, as an image captured from a Ukrainian drone purportedly showed a Bulsae-4 vehicle operating near Kharkiv.

In December 2024, Ukraine claimed to destroy a Bulsae-4 vehicle, with a Ukrainian media outlet (Euromaidan Press) releasing video of the destruction.

== See also ==
- Spike (missile) – (Israel)
- FGM-148 Javelin – (United States)
- HJ-10 – (China)
