= Type 96 multi-purpose missile system =

Japanese anti-tank/anti-landing craft missile

Type 96 MPMS
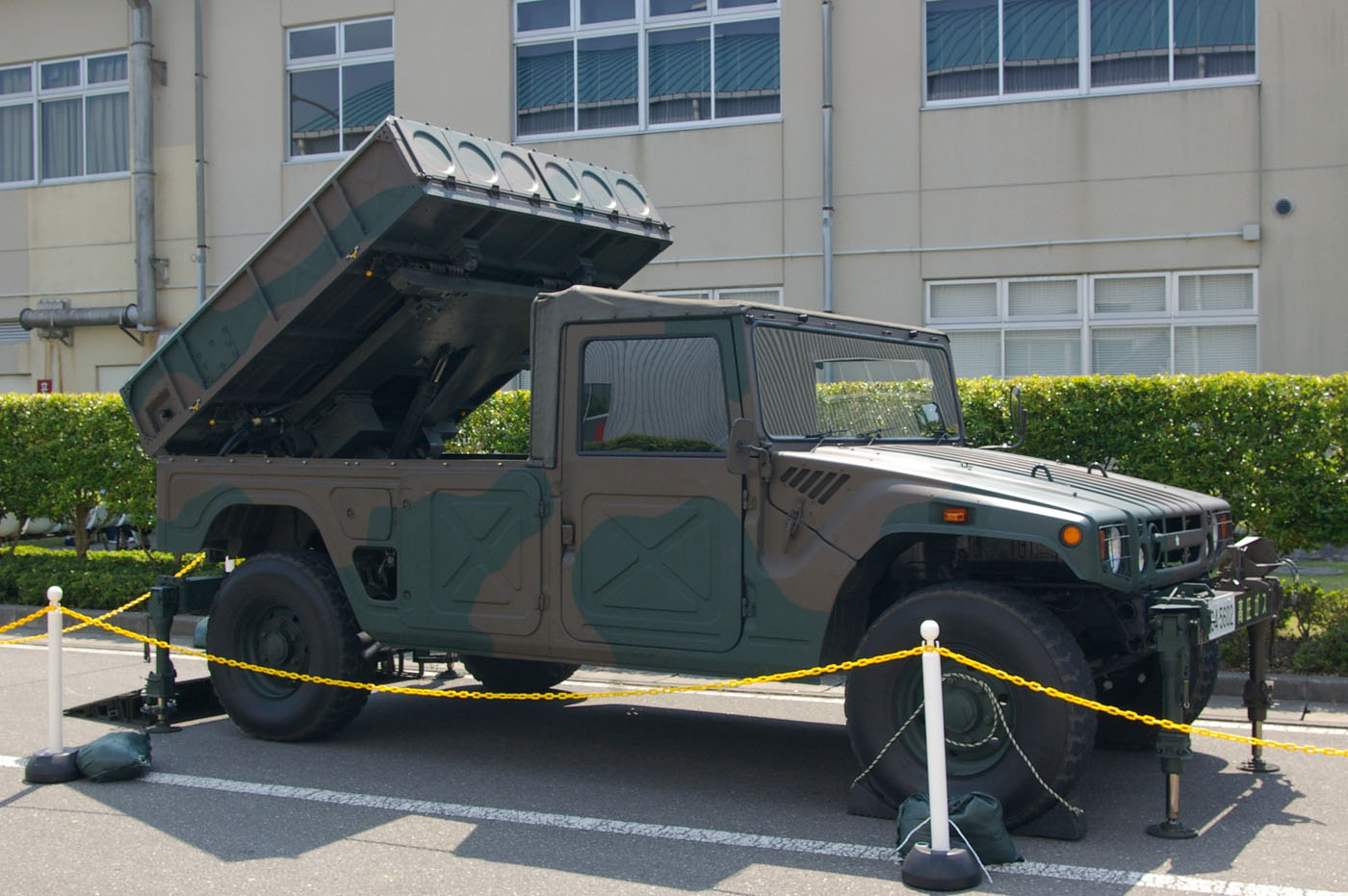
- Type 96 multi-purpose missile system
- Type: Anti-tank/anti-Landing craft missile
- Place of origin: Japan

Service history
- In service: 1996-present
- Used by: Japan

Production history
- Designer: JGSDF Ground Research and Development Command:GRD
- Manufacturer: Kawasaki Heavy Industries
- Unit cost: 2.4 billion yen (2007)

Specifications
- Mass: 60 kg
- Length: about 2.0 m
- Diameter: about 16 cm
- Engine: Solid fuel rocket
- Operational range: >over 10 km / 25 km estimate
- Guidance system: Infrared homing based on optical fibre imaging infrared (IIR)

The Type 96 multi-purpose missile system (96式多目的誘導弾システム) is an anti-tank/landing craft missile used by the JGSDF. It is the first Japanese missile system to use a complete digitally controlled interface.

== History ==
Development of the Type 96 system began in 1986 by the JGSDF Ground Research and Development Command.

== Description ==
The Type 96 missile has a large warhead which can destroy tanks with a direct hit from the top, but it can also be used in an anti-helicopter role. The missile is guided by an operator with an infrared image monitor in the launch vehicle. An optical fibre connects the flying missile's infrared camera and its guidance system. It can also be fired vertically and the fibre-optic cable is paid out from the back of the missile as it flies.

The warhead is unnecessarily large for attacking tanks because it is also designed to destroy landing craft (LCAC). Japanese officers estimate that no tank can survive a direct hit to the weak point of its top armor by the Type 96 multi-purpose missile system. This is a result of the missile striking the tank from the top, which is not so heavily armoured as the front and side sections.

It is designed to destroy remote targets before a landing, such as armoured fighting vehicles or small landing ships. The gunner carries out target selection and acquisition and the automatic tracker locks onto the image of the target. Tracking commands are relayed to the ground station computer, which sends steering command data up the fibre-optic cable to guide the missile. The gunner can also carry out manual tracking.

== Operators ==
- Japan: 37 sets (2012)

== Similar missiles ==
- ALAS – (Serbia)
- CM-501G – (China)
- FOG-MPM – (Brazil)
- MGM-157 EFOGM – (United States)
- XM501 Non-Line-of-Sight Launch System – (United States)
- Polyphem – (France, Germany, Italy)

== See also ==
- Middle range MPM – (Japan)
- Type 64 MAT – (Japan)
- Type 79 Jyu-MAT – (Japan)
- Type 01 LMAT – (Japan)
