= XM501 non-line-of-sight launch system =

Missile launch system

Non-line of sight launch system
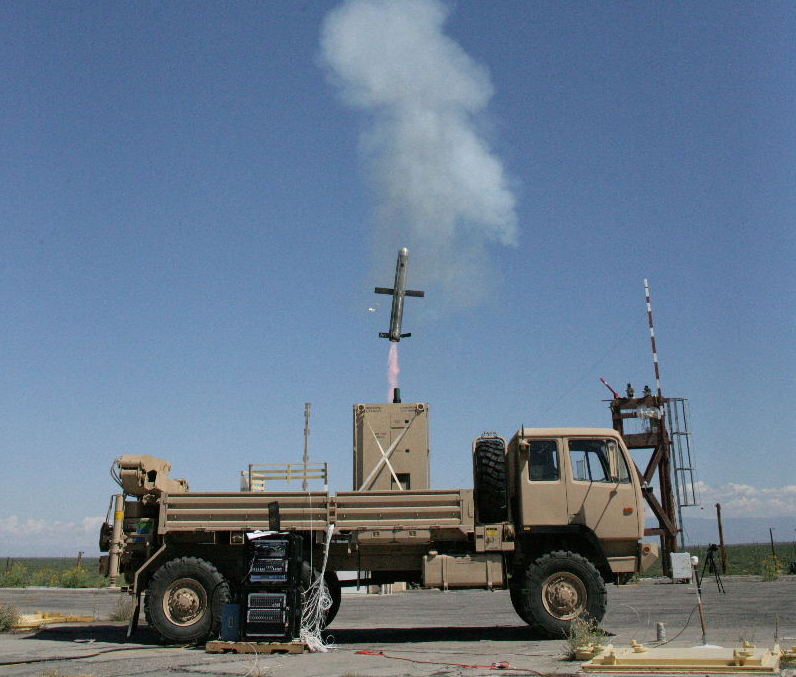
- NLOS missile launching from a CLU on the back of a truck
- Type: Self-contained missile launch system
- Place of origin: United States

Production history
- Designer: Lockheed Martin and Raytheon
- Unit cost: US$500,000 per missile
- Produced: Canceled

Specifications
- Mass: 3,150 lb (1.43 t; 1.58 short tons)
- Length: 45 in (1.1 m)
- Width: 45 in (1.1 m)
- Height: 78 in (2.0 m)
- Launch platform: CLU of 15 canistered missiles on truck, ship or ground

The non-line-of-sight launch system (NLOS-LS) was a self-contained missile launcher system that was under development by NETFIRES LLC, a partnership between Lockheed Martin and Raytheon. Each Container Launch Unit (CLU) holds 15 missiles, and a self-locating networked communications system. CLUs can be linked for coordinated launching, with the missiles fired and controlled remotely via autonomous vertical launch. The weapon is roughly 2 metres tall.

The program was cancelled early 2011. It was being developed for the United States Navy's Littoral Combat Ship, but has been criticised for performance issues. The Griffin missile has been recommended for use instead. NLOS-LS was to be used primarily on the United States Army's Future Combat Systems before it was canceled.

== Concept ==
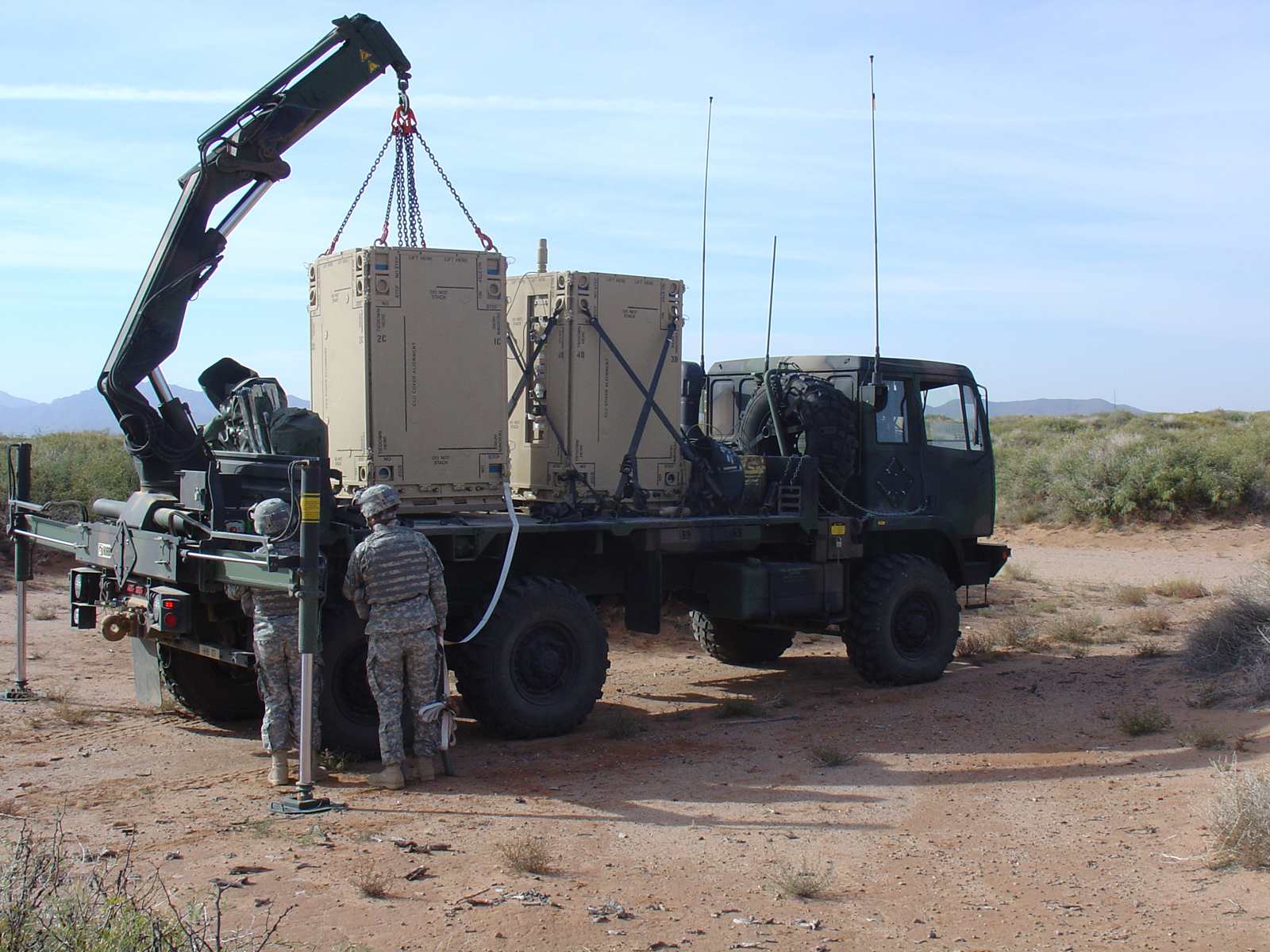
Two NLOS-LS CLUs loaded on a truck

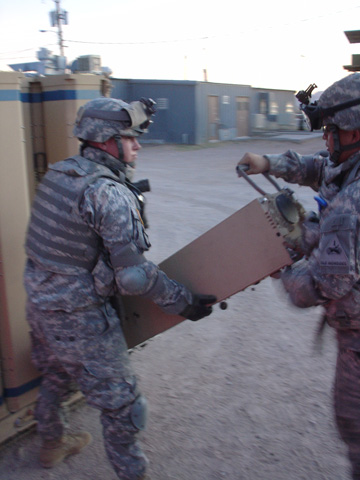
Reloading a single missile

There were to be two types of missile used with NLOS-LS: the precision attack munition (PAM) and the loitering attack munition (LAM). The LAM was originally contracted to Lockheed Martin Missiles and Fire Control, but the contract was terminated after costs rose and tests went poorly, after which, the PAM was the only armament currently being designed for the NLOS-LS.

- Height: 69 in (1,800 mm)
- Length: 11 in (280 mm)
- Width: 11 in (280 mm)

=== Precision attack munition (PAM) ===
Used to attack vehicles, armor, bunkers, and other targets of opportunity. Uses 3 modes of guidance, GPS/INS, semi-active laser homing, and autonomous imaging infrared. Carries a multi-mode warhead effective against several types of targets. It also includes an online library of pictures of targets, so that it can visually identify what it is homing in on.

==== Specifications ====
- Weight: 117 lb (53 kg)
- Diameter: 7 in (180 mm)
- Length: 60 in (1,500 mm)
- Guidance: GPS/INS, imaging infrared, semi-active laser homing.
- Datalink: Networked for in-flight updates, retargeting and images.
- Motor: Variable thrust rocket motor.
- Range: 25 mi (40 km)

=== Loitering attack munition (LAM) ===
A loitering munition designed to fly to a preset area and loiter while autonomously seeking out targets.

- Datalink: networked for in-flight updates, retargeting and images
- Motor: micro turbojet
- Range: 45 mi (72 km) with 30 min loiter time

== Development ==
- November 2002 – First guided flight of precision attack missile.
- December 2005 – Successful loitering attack missile boost test vehicle (BTV) flight test at Eglin Air Force Base, FL.
- April 2007 – Successful test launch of a precision attack missile from a CLU at White Sands Missile Range.
- June 2007 – Successful test of precision attack missile warhead against a fortified bunker.
- November 2008 – Successful first test of precision attack missile fired from container launch unit. Scores hit on T-72 tank.
- May 2009 – Captive flight test clears way for over-water flights to test capability against small boats.
- Feb 2010 – Four out of six missiles fail to hit their targets in a limited user test.
- April 2010 – US Army calls for program to be canceled.
- 3 May 2010 – The U.S. Army removes the system from their website.
- 12 May 2010 – House Armed Services seapower and expeditionary forces subcommittee moves R&D funding to Navy budget.
- 18 May 2010 – Defense Department approved an Army recommendation to cancel the program
- 6 Jan 2011 – DefSec Gates announces end of program.
- 2012 – US Navy was to begin at-sea testing of LCS surface missile module.

== See also ==
The JUMPER missile system from Israel Aerospace Industries uses a similar concept, but with 8 missiles instead of 15 and without the IR seeker.

- ALAS – (Serbia)
- AFT-10 ground launcher – (China)
- FOG-MPM – (Brazil)
- MGM-157 EFOGM – (United States)
- Polyphem – (France, Germany, Italy)
- Type 96 multi-purpose missile system – (Japan)
