= Middle-range multi-purpose missile =

Japanese anti-tank/anti-landing craft missile

Middle-range MPM
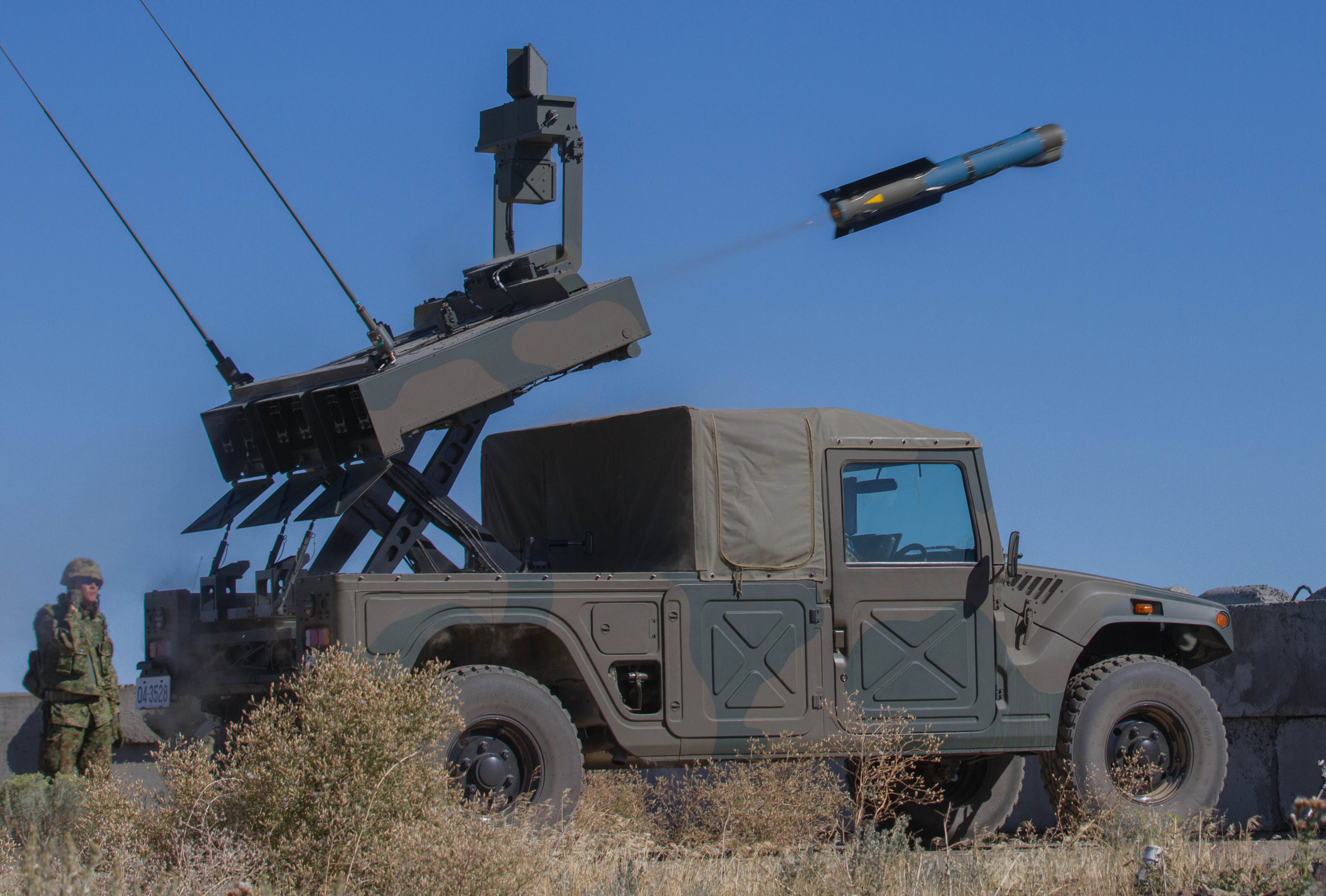
- Middle range multi-purpose missile
- Type: Anti-tank/anti-landing-craft missile
- Place of origin: Japan

Service history
- In service: 2009 - present
- Used by: Japan

Production history
- Designer: JGSDF Ground Research and Development Command:GRD
- Manufacturer: Kawasaki Heavy Industries
- No. built: 104 Sets (2017)

Specifications
- Mass: about 26 kg
- Length: 1.4 m
- Diameter: 14 cm
- Engine: Solid fuel rocket
- Guidance system: Semi-active laser guidance and infrared homing

The middle-range multi-purpose missile (中距離多目的誘導弾) or Chū-MPM (中MPM) is an anti-tank/landing craft missile used by the JGSDF.

== Description ==
The Chū-MPM is smaller and much less expensive than the Type 96 MPMS. As such, it is deployed in greater numbers. The system controls are contained entirely within each vehicle for taking independent action.

The missiles are guided by semi-active laser homing or infrared imaging.

The missiles are 1.4 metres (4 ft 7 in) in length and 0.14 metres (5.5 in) in diameter and weigh 26 kilograms (57 lb) (including the launcher). They are made by Kawasaki Heavy Industries.

== Operators ==
- Japan: 104 sets (2017)

== Gallery ==
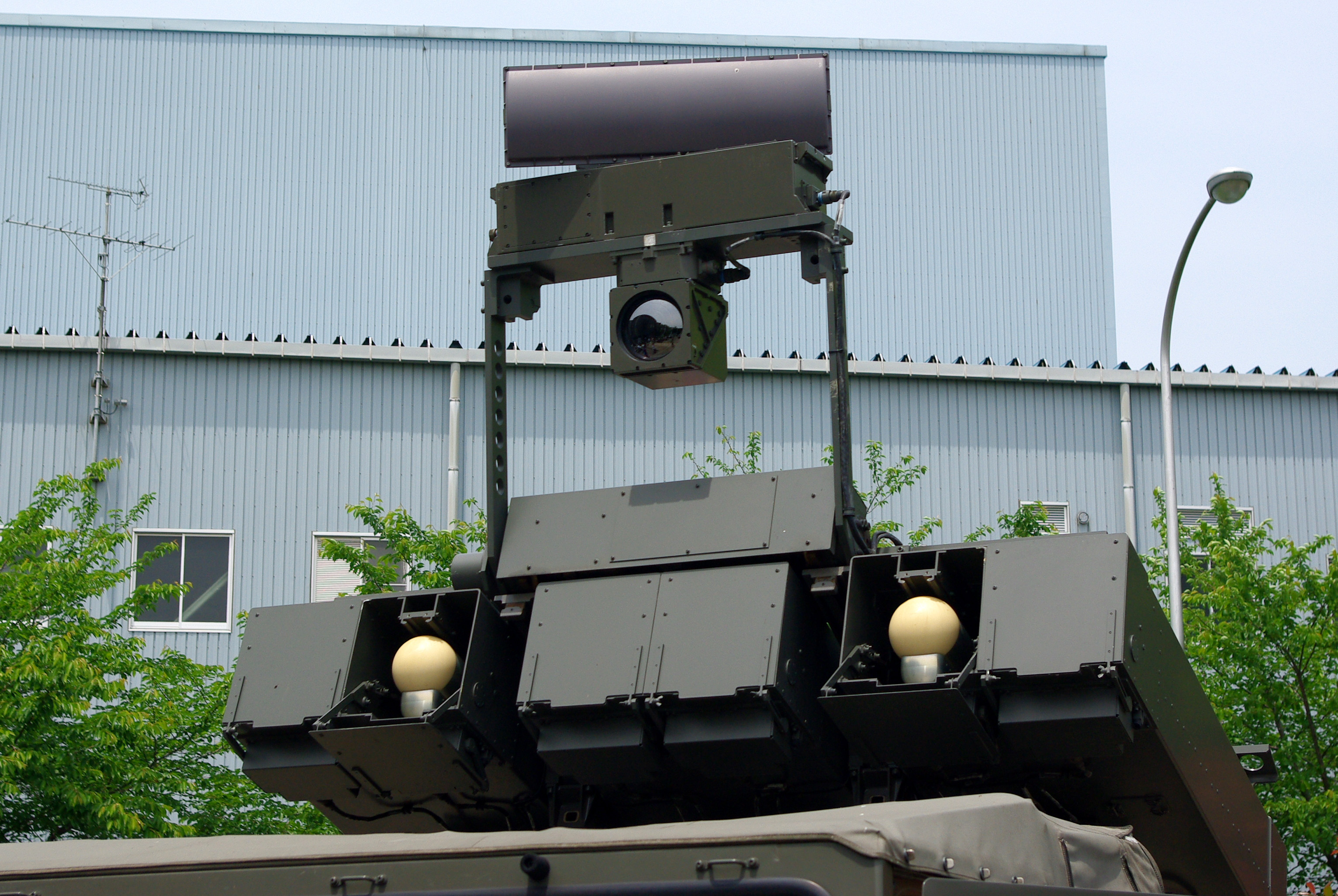
Close up

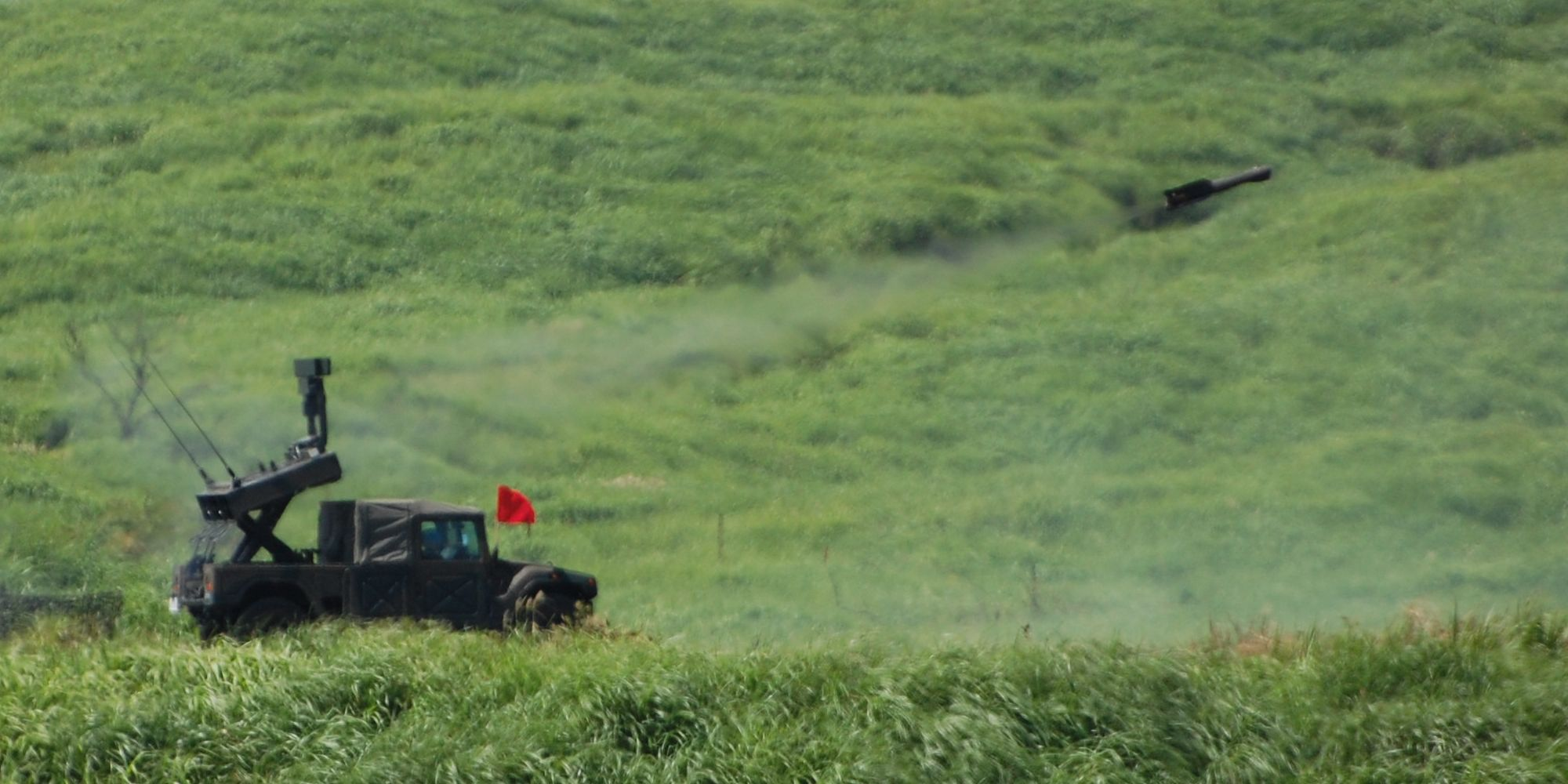
Missile launch

== See also ==
- Type 01 LMAT – (Japan)
- Type 64 MAT – (Japan)
- Type 79 Jyu-MAT – (Japan)
