= Qaem =

Iranian surface-to-air missile and glide bomb

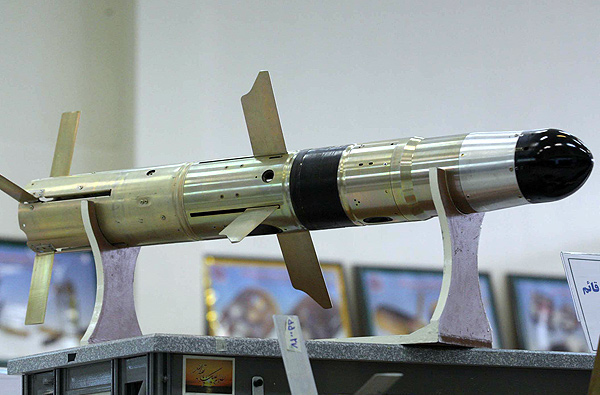
A surface-to-air Qaem missile.

The Qaem (or Ghaem; Persian: قائم, lit. 'upright') refers to two completely distinct Iranian weapons: an air-to-ground glide bomb and a surface-to-air missile. These two weapons are similarly sized and identically named, and are both developed from the Toophan missile, but are separate weapon systems.

== Qaem surface-to-air missile ==
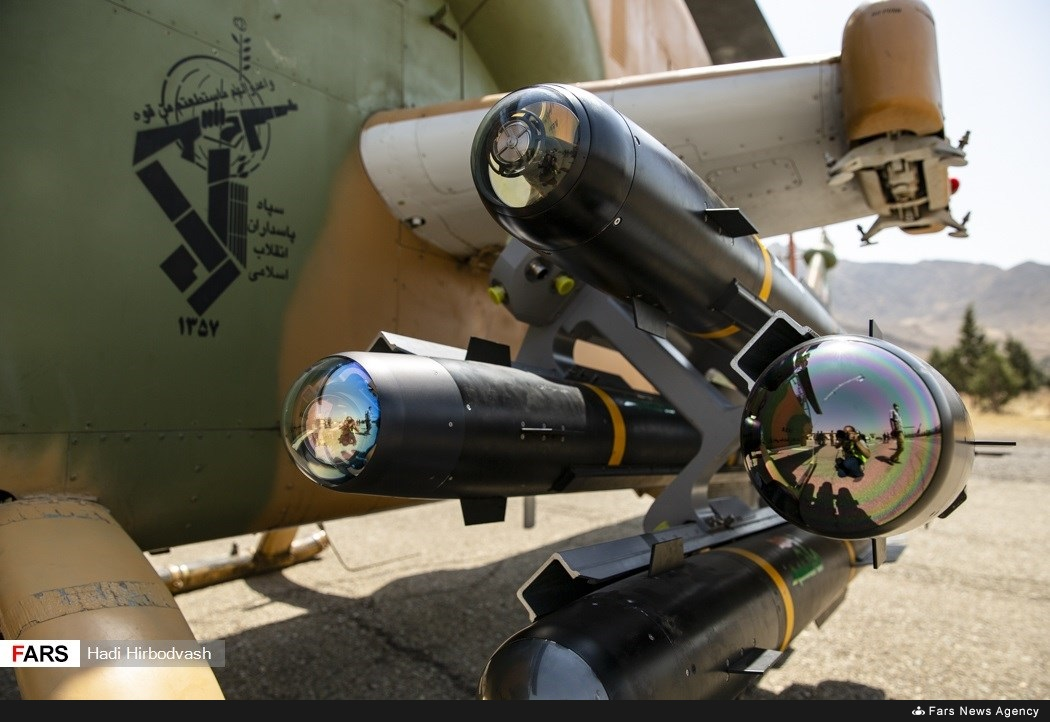
Two Qaem-114 missiles (middle left, middle right) mounted on IAIO Toufan helicopter. Other two missiles are Qassem

This is an Iranian SACLOS beam-riding SHORAD surface-to-air missile. With a range of six kilometers and a maximum altitude of two kilometers, the Qaem is intended for use against UAVs and low flying or stationary helicopters. The Qaem is a development of the Toophan missile, itself an unlicensed copy of the American BGM-71 TOW missile, and entered mass production in 2010.

The Qaem anti-aircraft missile uses a laser guidance system. Iran also produces a variant, the Qaem-M, which adds a proximity fuse. This weapon appears to be designed and manufactured based on the Toophan which is an anti-tank guided missile.

- Ghaem-114 toophan missile comparable of AGM-114

North Korea may operate Qaem-114.

The Islamic Republic of Iran mass-produces these missiles. This type of missile is capable of being fired from the surface as well as from helicopters. This anti-armor missile is capable of destroying low-speed, low-altitude targets. No information has been released about this missile's technical specifications, but according to published photos of it and its physical appearance, it is nearly 120 centimeters long, weighs 18 to 20 kilograms, and has a diameter of about 15 centimetres. Since the Toophan missile has a range of 3,850 meters, this missile will have the same range, too. The vertical anti-helicopter-guided missile can be guided by laser beams and is resistant to electronic warfare and enemy disruption.

== Qaem air-to-ground bomb ==
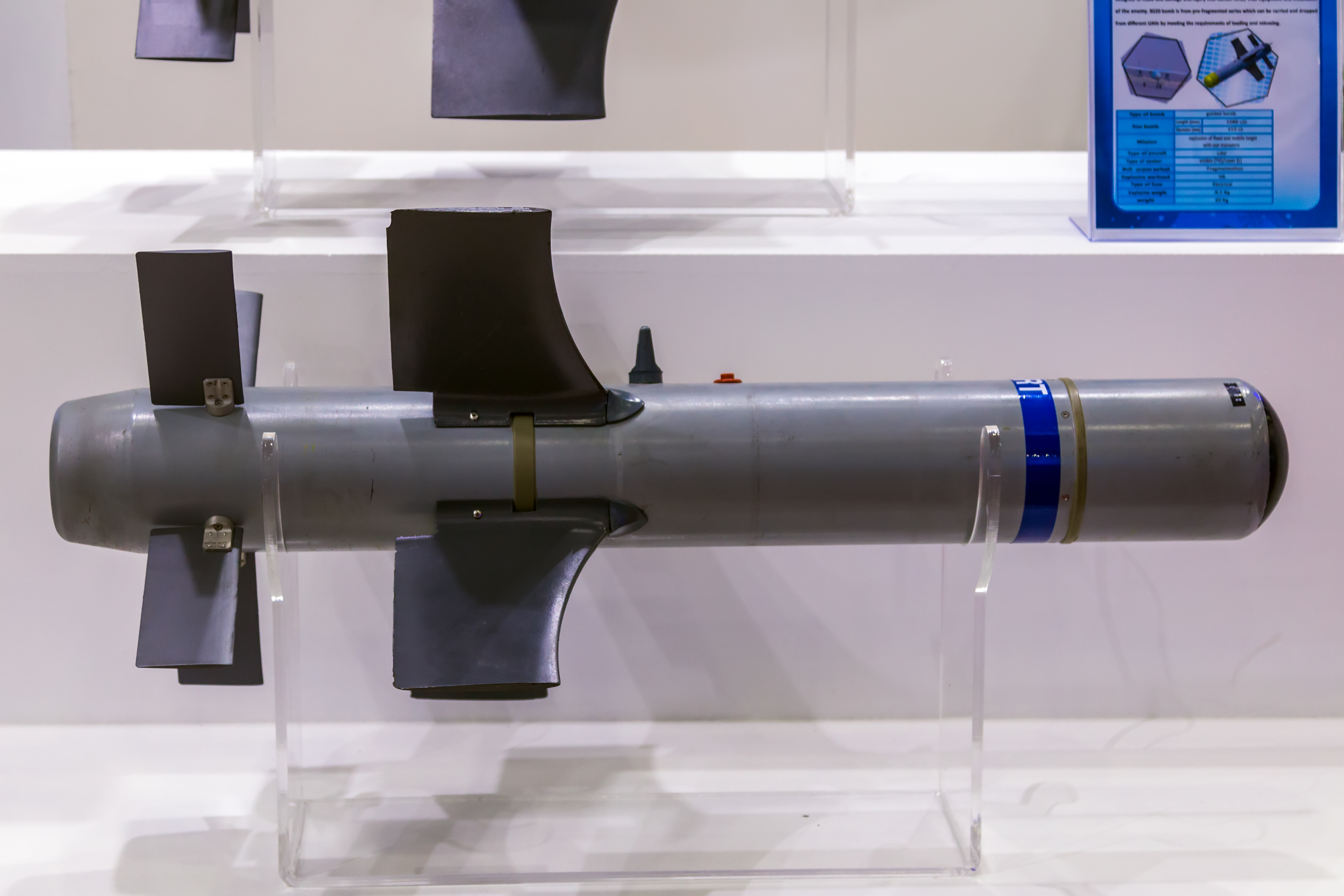
a Qaem air-to-ground munition seen at an arms expo.

A completely unrelated Iranian munition, but also named "Qaem," is carried by Qods Mohajer-6 UAVs and Hamaseh UAVs.

The Qaem is available in four variants: the Qaem 1, with a suspected infrared seeker; a variant simply named Qaem, with suspected laser guidance; a larger variant named Qaem-5, with TV guidance; and an even larger variant named Qaem-9, also with TV guidance.

The Qaem A2G glide bomb is related to the Sadid-345 glide bomb, but has different wings and size.
