= Polyphem =

Canceled European missile project

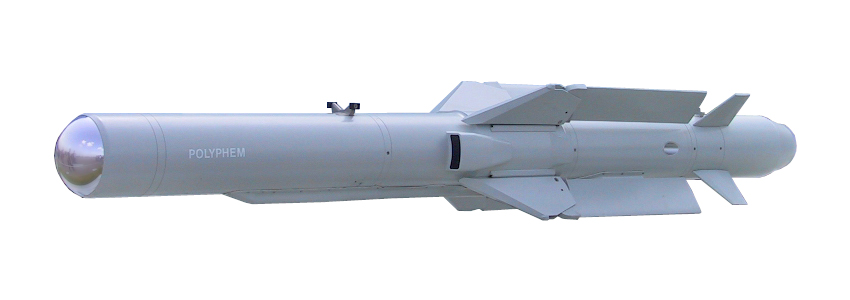
Polyphem-S missile

The Polyphem was a proposed European lightweight fibre-optic wire-guided surface-to-surface missile with a range of 60 km. The project was cancelled in 2003.

== Synopsis ==
Polyphem is the German name of Polyphemus, the cyclops in the Odyssey that got his eye stabbed out by Ulysses.

The Polyphem missile uses a sealed round, a solid propellant booster rocket to launch the missile out of its canister to an initial height, so that the wings and control surfaces can unfold, and a more fuel economic turbojet cruise engine kicks in to propel the missile.

The missile can be programmed to follow a preset course, using GPS or inertial guidance. An infrared seeker can be used to automatically pick a target and for the terminal guidance phase, but it is also possible to transfer the thermal images back to the launching platform via a 200 MBit/s data link provided by an optical fibre, and manually select the target.

The Polyphem program was started in 1994 by Germany, France and Italy. Italy later left the project.

A naval version, called Polyphem-S, was initially selected for the Braunschweig class corvette as anti-ship and land-attack missile, but that has been cancelled.

The Polyphem program as a whole was cancelled in 2003.

The system is roughly comparable to the Serbian ALAS missile.

== Specifications ==
- Speed: 120—180 m/s (around 430—650 km/h)
- Range: up to 60 km
- Altitude: 20 to 600 m above ground (variable)
- Missile mass: around 130 kg
- Length: 2.70 m
- Warhead: up to 20 kg

== See also ==
- ALAS – (Serbia)
- CM-501G – (China)
- FOG-MPM – (Brazil)
- MGM-157 EFOGM – (United States)
- XM501 non-line-of-sight launch system – (United States)
- Type 96 multi-purpose missile system – (Japan)
