= Nimrod (missile) =

Israeli air-to-surface missile

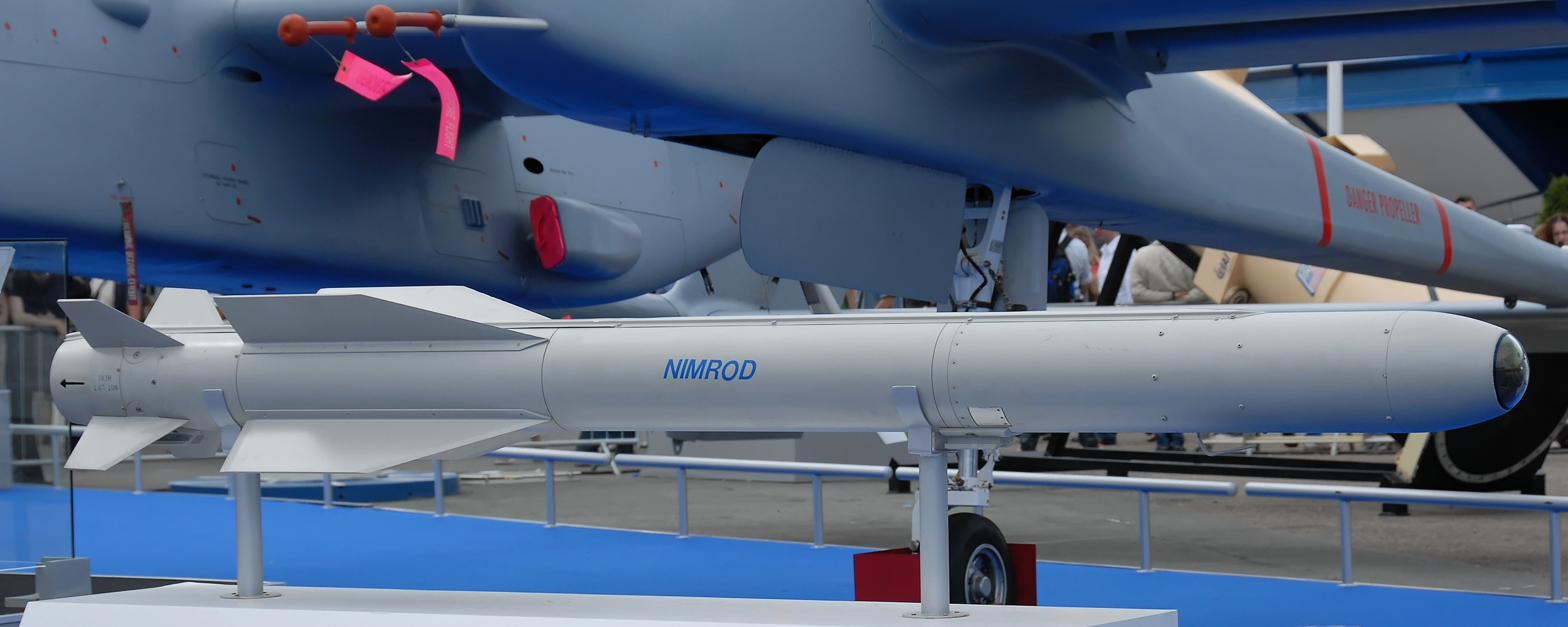
Nimrod missile in Paris Air Show

The Nimrod is a long-range air-to-surface missile developed by Israel Aerospace Industries. While designed for mainly anti-tank warfare, it provides standoff strike ability against a variety of point targets such as armoured personnel carriers (APCs), ships, bunkers, personnel concentrations, and guerrillas.

Nimrod has a semi-active laser guidance system that operates day or night. Its flight trajectory can be set below obscuring cloud layers, while a forward reconnaissance scout team uses a laser designator to direct it from up to 26 km (16 mi).

Nimrod may be installed on a variety of towed launchers, light combat vehicle launchers, helicopters, and fixed-wing aircraft. The primary helicopter launch platform for the Nimrod in the Israel Defense Forces is a modified Sikorsky CH-53 Sea Stallion helicopter. The launching vehicle or aircraft may fire up to 4 Nimrods at once from a single pack.

== Description ==
Nimrod is a long-range semi-active laser-guided anti-tank guided missile (ATGM), developed by the MBT Weapon System Division. It has a solid-propellant rocket and can operate day or night. It can also serve as an anti-ship missile.

Nimrod allows a gunner to pre-select a flight trajectory mode. This can be direct trajectory, high cruise trajectory or low cruise trajectory, the cruise altitude being constant and between 300–1,500 m (980–4,920 ft).

Mid-course guidance is provided by an inertial navigation system, and terminal guidance by a semi-active laser homing seeker. The target can be illuminated either by a ground-based or airborne laser designator.

The gimballed and stabilised seeker head acquires, tracks and homes in on its target using localised proportional navigation. It is said to have a view angle of more than 30°. The seeker has a search area 5 km (3.1 mi) wide and deep. In the terminal flight phase, the weapon adopts a dive angle of approximately 45° to strike an armoured target on the thinner, more vulnerable upper surfaces.

The missile is stored in a sealed canister which also acts as the launcher. Total weight of the missile and canister is 150 kg (330 lb). It has five main sections: seeker, guidance and control, warhead, solid-propellant rocket motor, and servo. It is roll-stabilised in flight. Time to come into action at a launch site is less than 3 minutes; there is no need to survey the site for alignment or levelling, nor does it require a direct line of sight to a target. The weapon can be fired in single-round, ripple, or salvo modes.

== Characteristics ==
- Effective range: 300 - 36,000 meters
- Length: 265 cm
- Diameter: 17 cm
- Body: 18 cm
- Span 40 cm
- Weight: 100 kg
- Speed: ~1000 km/h or Mach 0.8
- Propulsion: Single stage solid-propellant rocket motor
- Guidance: Semi-active laser homing
- Warhead: High-explosive anti-tank (HEAT), fragmentation high explosive (HE), thermobaric, or anti-personnel

== Variants ==
As of 2022, three Nimrod versions exist:

- Nimrod 2 – A dual guidance, laser and Global Positioning System (GPS), homing missile, with a range of 26 km (16 mi), and a mobile launcher. The warhead is 14 kg (31 lb), and the missile supports various warheads for a variety of targets. This missile is well suited to rapid response and for coastal defence.
- Nimrod 3 – An extended variant of Nimrod 2. The missile has a range of 50 km (31 mi) with 50 kg (110 lb) warhead. It supports various warheads for a wide range of targets, and has a mobile launcher.
- Nimrod SR – A short-range (8 km (5.0 mi)) variant that can be fired from ground and airborne platforms.

== Operators ==
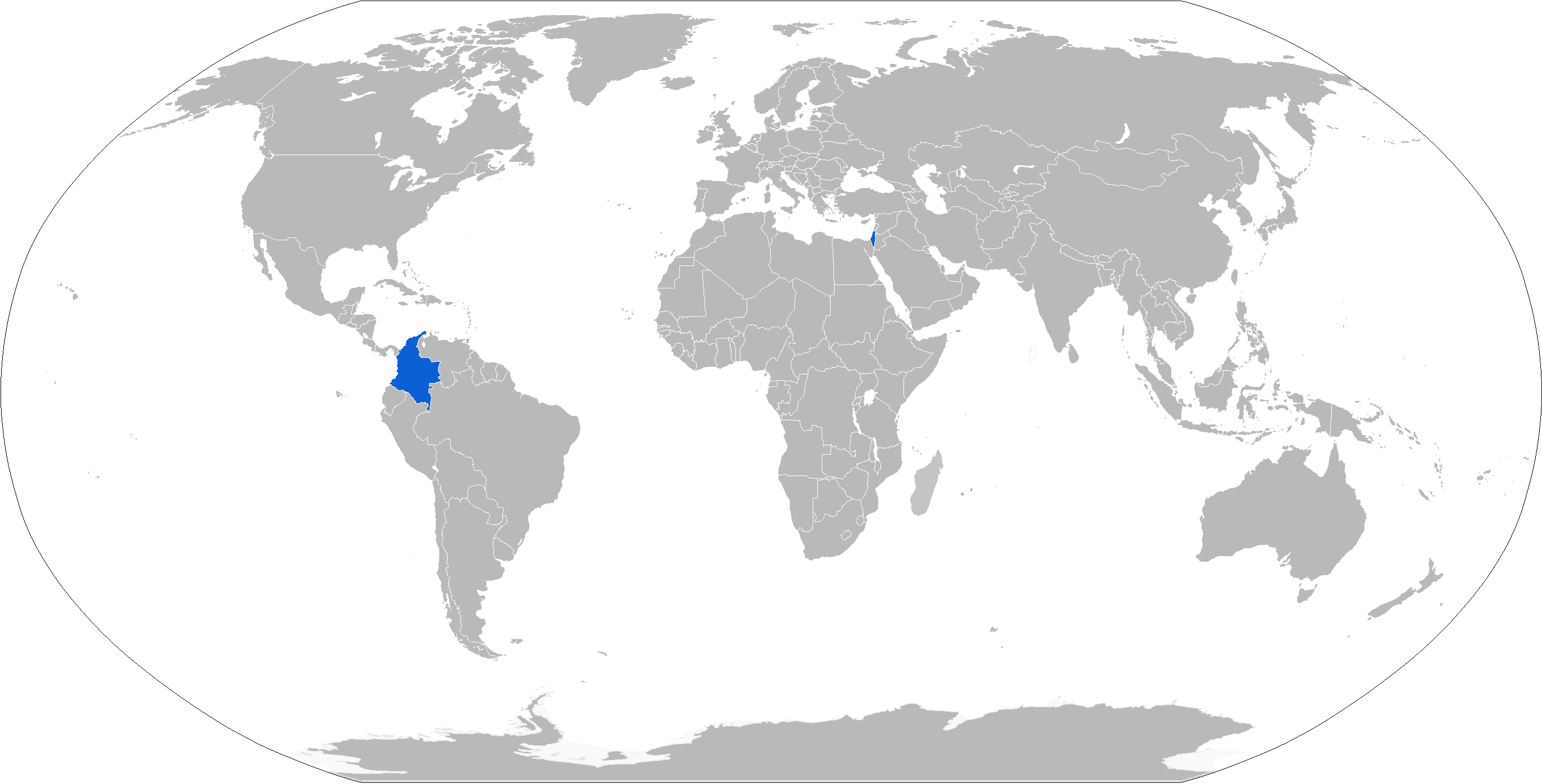
Map with Nimrod operators in blue

=== Current operators ===
- Israel
- Colombia

== Comparable systems ==
- Spike NLOS – (Israel)
- AGM-169 Joint Common Missile – (United States)

== See also ==
- LAHAT, renamed Nimrod-SR for the Latin American market.
