= IAI JUMPER =

Israeli missile launch system

JUMPER
- Type: Self-contained missile launch system
- Place of origin: Israel

Production history
- Designer: Israel Aerospace Industries

Specifications
- Mass: 63 kg (139 lb)
- Length: 1,800 mm (71 in)
- Width: 150 mm (5.9 in)
- Propellant: solid fuel
- Operational range: 50 km (31 mi)
- Launch platform: 8 missiles in a vertical launch hive on truck, ship or ground

The JUMPER (Hebrew: מנתר) is a self-contained missile launcher system that was developed by Israel Aerospace Industries. Each vertical launch hive (VLH) has 8 missiles with an integrated command & control unit.

The JUMPER system requires no operating crew and no special platform. The 1.4 x 1.4m and a height of 2m dimension vertical launch hive can be deployed on a truck, ship or ground. Missile guidance is by GPS or Inertial guidance system for pinpoint accuracy at ranges of up to 50 km (31 mi). An optional laser guidance enhancement will enable the weapon to hit at even higher precision, enable limited 'man in the loop' capability and address moving targets. Each missile is 1800 mm long, has a 150 mm diameter and a weight of 63 kg.

The missile system could receive the location of enemy positions from unmanned air systems in the battlespace; and according to the received data, the JUMPER would launch a number of missiles. The missiles could give a variety of effects including minimal collateral damage. The system can be considered as an example of asymmetric warfare being used on a complex battlefield.

== Specifications ==
Data from Israel Aerospace Industries

- Weight: 63 kg (139 lb)
- Diameter: 150 mm (5.9 in)
- Length: 1,800 mm (71 in)
- Range: 50 km (31 mi)
- Motor: Two-phase rocket motor
- Overall dimensions: 1.4x1.4x2 m (length x width x height)
- Guidance: GPS/INS
- Datalink: Integrated command and control unit
