= Sub-munition anti-tank =

German air-to-ground anti-tank munition

SMAT, or the sub-munition, anti-tank was a project by German weapon manufacturer Diehl BGT around 1994 to develop an autonomously-guided anti-tank weapon that would be launched via missiles in clusters.

The project was sponsored by the Bundesministerium der Verteidigung (BMVg) as one of two guided munitions (SMAT and SMASH). While SMASH was to be used primarily against aircraft shelters, SMAT was to be used against tanks.

The missile was to be launched into an area and the submunitions were to be released overhead. The SMAT would then use either IIR homing or MMV radar homing onto a target. The munition was able to autonomously detect and track its targets and was also able to identify and distinguish between tanks and unarmoured vehicles. The Munition may have used IMX-101 explosive, however more data about its specific features is scarce.

== Testing ==
A full-scale version of SMAT was tested by the Germans by suspending it under the wing of an Alpha Jet to simulate the deployment from a stand-off missile dispenser. The aircraft released the unit at a designated area where the munition, fell downwards, detected, locked onto a target and glided directly into the roof of it, achieving a direct hit.
