= ALAS (missile) =

Serbian multi-purpose surface-to surface missile

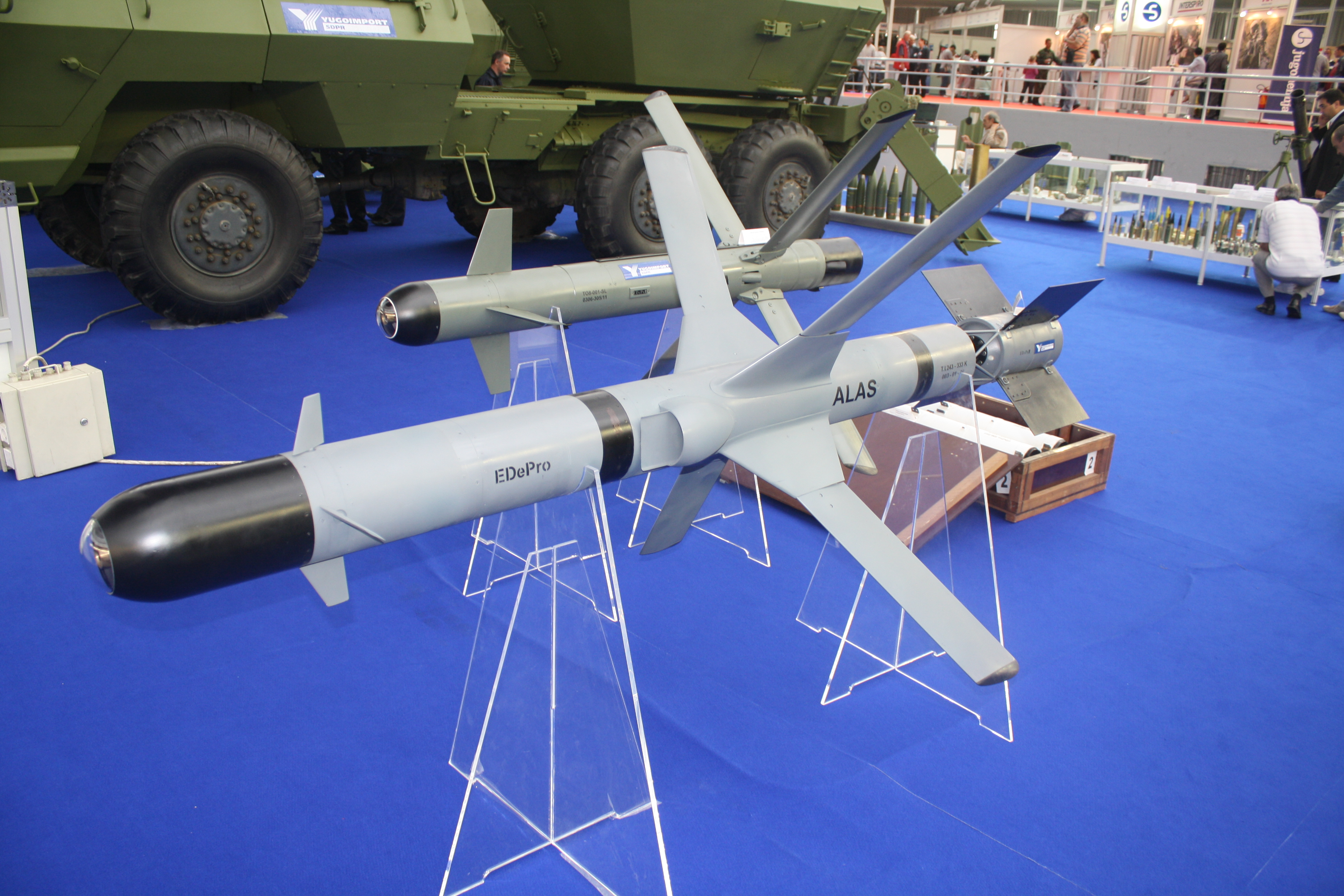
- ALAS missile
- Type: Multi-purpose surface-to surface missile
- Place of origin: Serbia

Production history
- Manufacturer: EDePro, Yugoimport SDPR

Specifications
- Mass: 77 kg
- Length: 2,720 mm
- Diameter: 175 mm × 1,450 mm (wingspan)
- Engine: solid fuel boost phase motor, EDePro TMM-404 single-shaft turbojet
- Maximum speed: 130–150m/s
- Guidance system: optical IR or TV
- Accuracy: less than 1 meter CEP

ALAS (Advanced Light Attack System, Serbian: АЛАС) is a Serbian medium-range multipurpose wire-guided missile developed by Serbian companies EDePro and Yugoimport SDPR. The ALAS missile is developed primarily to engage tanks, armored vehicles, command posts, industrial facilities, and bridges.

== Characteristics ==
ALAS can deliver long-range precision strikes at distances of up to 25 kilometres and features man-in-the-loop control for real-time target discrimination and mid-course updates against high-value or time-sensitive targets. Its sensor suite integrates advanced electro-optical (EO) and infrared (IR) seekers with day/night thermal imaging for high-precision target detection and tracking. A dual communications architecture (via secure fibre-optic cable or radio link as a backup) ensures mission flexibility across varied terrain and in contested electromagnetic environments. Its integrated tandem warhead can penetrate over 1,000 mm of rolled homogenous armour.

Optimized for modular force integration, the system is fielded with Serbian Army artillery units on M-18 Oganj modular self-propelled multiple rocket launchers. Each vehicle can be equipped with 4 to 8 missile containers. It is hot-launched from its container by means of a solid-propellant boost motor.

=== Specifications ===
- Takeoff mass: 77 kg
- Length: 2.72 meters
- Diameter: 175 mm
- Wingspan: 1.45 m
- Warhead weight: 10.5 kg
- Caliber: 175 mm
- Speed: 130–150 m/s (mid-course)
- Altitude: 500 m
- Maximum range: 25 km
- Target detection range: 12 km
- Target recognition range: 10 km
- Tracking and lock-on range: 7 km

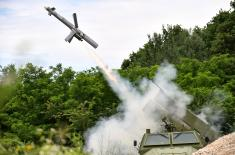
ALAS launched from the M-18 Oganj

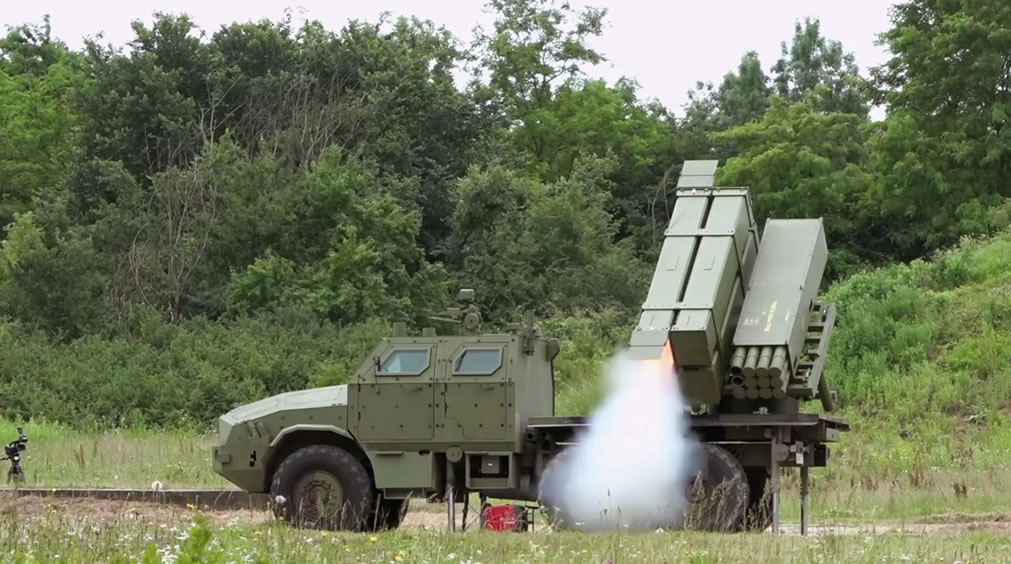
ALAS launchers on the M-18 Oganj

=== Guidance ===
The missile is programmed to follow a preset course around or over any obstructing terrain using electronic terrain maps. The terminal guidance phase uses infrared imaging, making it possible to transfer thermal images back to the launching platform via a 200 MBit/s data link provided by an optical fibre. Thus, it is possible to manually select a target or abort the mission. Missile communication is realized via optical mono mode cable with two channels (communication directions): image transmission and data from missile to ground as well as data transmission from ground station to vehicle.

Firing station comprises a high-performance compact computer for missile guidance, an operator control panel and a high-resolution display. The system uses advanced control and image processing algorithms, electro-optical converters and radio links. The firing station has an optional GPS and north-seeking device. The firing station is used for mission planning before the engagement. The firing station stores a digitized map and displays the map during missile flight. For some applications, a dual monitor system is used. The firing unit can be used as a trainer and simulator without additional hardware.

=== Propulsion ===
During launch, a solid propellant booster accelerates the missile to an initial cruising speed (120–150 m/s). Then the TMM-040 turbojet ignites to take the missile to the target under control of the guidance system and the operator. Missile main engine is a Mongoose 040 turbojet that permits a sub-sonic top speed of around 640–740 km/h (340-400 mph). In launch phase, it uses two assigned propellant boosters; solid propellant booster is positioned on the rear side on the missile body placed after turbojet engine with requirements that thrust vector direction going through missile center of gravity position.

== Operators ==
- Serbia – 60 missiles in service with the Serbian Army, as of 2025.

== See also ==
- AFT-10 Missile Carrier – (China)
- FOG-MPM – (Brazil)
- MGM-157 EFOGM – (United States)
- XM501 non-line-of-sight launch system – (United States)
- Polyphem – (France, Germany, Italy)
