= Karaok =

- Type: Anti-tank missile
- Place of origin: Turkey

Service history
- In service: 2022–present
- Used by: Turkish Army

Production history
- Designer: Roketsan
- Designed: 2016

Specifications
- Mass: <16 kg (35 lb) (tube and missile)
- Length: 110 cm (43 in)
- Diameter: 125 mm (4.9 in)
- Effective firing range: >2,500 m (1.6 mi)
- Warhead: Tandem-charge HEAT
- Guidance system: Infrared homing
- Launch platform: Man-portable launcher

Karaok (Turkish: Black Arrow) is a 125 mm manportable, lightweight, fire-and-forget, short-range anti-tank guided missile (ATGM) in development by Roketsan. It is designed to operate and fire by a single infantry soldier. It is one of the Turkish-made ATGMs, along with the medium-range OMTAS, long-range UMTAS and gun-launched TANOK.

== Design ==
The missile is equipped with a tandem warhead and a new indigenously developed hybrid dual-stage rocket motor designed to enable fire from an enclosed space. Range was initially over 2500 m, weight is less than 16 kg (tube and missile), length is 110 cm. The missile is capable of both direct and top attack. The system is effective at both day or night due to its Imaging Infrared Seeker. The weapon system achieved Initial Operational Capability (IOC) in 2020 and was inducted into the Turkish Army in 2022.

== Operators ==
- Malaysia: 18 launchers and 108 missiles on order. To be mounted on Cendana Auto 4x4.
- Turkey: 330 on order.

== See also ==
- List of rocket launchers
- Akeron MP – (France)
- AT-1K Raybolt – (South Korea)
- FGM-148 Javelin – (United States)
- HJ-12 – (China)
- MPATGM – (India)
- NLAW – (Sweden, United Kingdom)
- Spike (missile) – (Israel)
- Type 01 LMAT – (Japan)
