= OMTAS =

Turkish-made portable fire-and-forget anti-tank missile

OMTAS Medium Range Anti-Tank Missile System
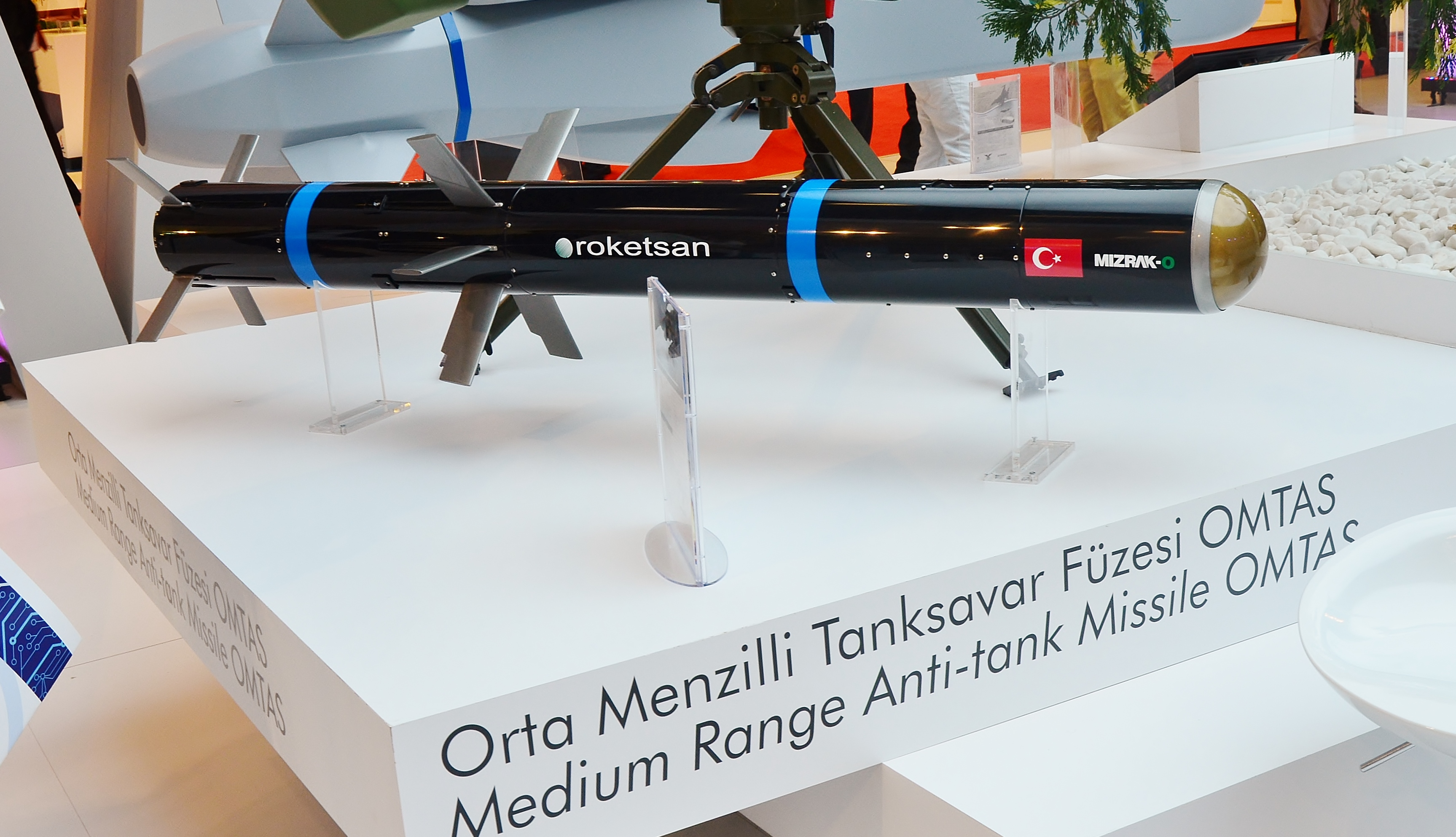
- Type: Anti-tank guided missile
- Place of origin: Turkey

Service history
- In service: 2017–present
- Used by: Turkey

Production history
- Designer: Roketsan
- Manufacturer: Roketsan

Specifications
- Mass: Missile and launch tube: 35 kilograms (77 lb); Tripod platform: 36 kilograms (79 lb)
- Length: 1.8 metres (71 in)
- Diameter: 160 mm
- Effective firing range: 200 – 4,000 m
- Warhead: Tandem-charge HEAT; High explosive blast fragmentation
- Engine: Dual thrust rocket motor
- Guidance system: Fire-and-forget mode: Imaging infrared (IIR) guidance; Fire-and-update mode: RF data link guidance
- Launch platform: Tripod, vehicle, stabilized land platform, remote controlled turret

The OMTAS (Orta Menzilli Tanksavar Sistemi), also known as Mızrak-O, is a Turkish medium range anti-tank guided missile developed by Roketsan. It is one of the Turkish-made ATGMs, along with the short-range Karaok, long-range UMTAS and gun-launched TANOK.

OMTAS is an advanced system with various types of latest technologies, effective against modern armored threats on the battlefield.

== Design ==
OMTAS weapon system is a combination of missile, missile launching platform with fire control unit, carrying cases, and training simulator. It intended to destroy stationary and moving armored targets. Firing can occur from a tripod mount, vehicle, stabilized land platform, or remote controlled turret. The missile has two types of selectable warhead to use, tandem-charge high-explosive anti-tank (HEAT) and high explosive (HE) fragmentation. The tandem HEAT warhead is designed to counter the armor of modern main battle tanks and HE fragmentation warhead to attack infantry positions and light or non-armored vehicles. The system can use a thermographic camera sight.

OMTAS features day and night all-weather abilities, direct attack and top attack modes, switching targets during flight, fire-behind-mask, fire-and-forget, and fire-and-update modes. The impact point on a target can be updated during flight. OMTAS's uncooled imaging infrared (IIR) seeker is supplied by another Turkish defense company Aselsan. Actual armor penetration of the tandem-charge HEAT warhead is still classified but it can be assumed that it is not less than 1000 mm behind explosive reactive armor (ERA) and could be more deadly with its wider 160 mm diameter.

== Replacement ==
OMTAS is likely to replace current 152 mm BGM-71 TOW and 103 mm MILAN in Turkish service. As of 2021, OMTAS is the largest top attack missile developed by a NATO member state.

== Operators ==
Turkey: Turkish Land Forces
Kosovo: Kosovo Security Force

== L-OMTAS ==
The L-OMTAS is a laser-guided variant of the OMTAS medium-range anti-tank guided missile developed by Roketsan. Unlike the baseline OMTAS, which uses an imaging infrared (IIR) seeker, the L-OMTAS employs semi-active laser guidance. This provides an alternative guidance option for engagements where external target designation is available. The missile can be launched from ground-based tripod launchers as well as integrated onto land platforms. It has a reported maximum range of 5.5 km and entered serial production in 2026 for service with the Turkish Armed Forces.

== See also ==
- Akeron MP – (France)
- FGM-148 Javelin – (United States)
- HJ-12 – (China)
- MPATGM – (India)
- AT-1K Raybolt – (South Korea)
- Type 01 LMAT – (Japan)
