= Type 01 LMAT =

Japanese-made portable fire-and-forget anti-tank missile

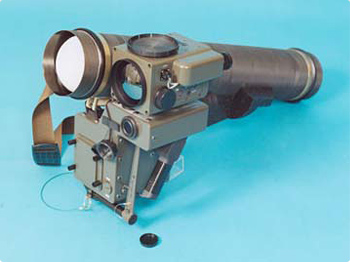
- A Type 01 LMAT launcher on display.
- Type: Manportable fire-and-forget anti-tank missile
- Place of origin: Japan

Service history
- In service: 2001–present
- Used by: Japan

Production history
- Designer: Defense Agency Technical Research and Development Institute
- Designed: 1993
- Manufacturer: Kawasaki Heavy Industries
- Unit cost: $260,000 (reusable Command Launch Unit) (2001)
- Produced: 2001–present

Specifications
- Mass: 11.4 kg missile 17.5 kg system
- Length: 970 mm
- Diameter: 140 mm
- Caliber: 140 mm
- Effective firing range: 4 km
- Sights: Thermographic camera (Uncooled infrared detector)
- Warhead: Tandem-charged HEAT warhead
- Detonation mechanism: Impact force
- Engine: Solid Fuel Rocket
- Guidance system: infrared homing, CCD

The Type 01 LMAT (01式軽対戦車誘導弾, 01-shiki kei-tai-sensha yūdō-dan) is a Japanese man-portable fire-and-forget anti-tank missile. Development began in 1993 at Kawasaki Heavy Industries and was accepted into service in 2001. During development, the missile was designated with the codename XATM-5. Later it was known briefly as the ATM-5.

In the 1st Airborne Brigade, it is used as its main anti-armor weapon.

== History ==
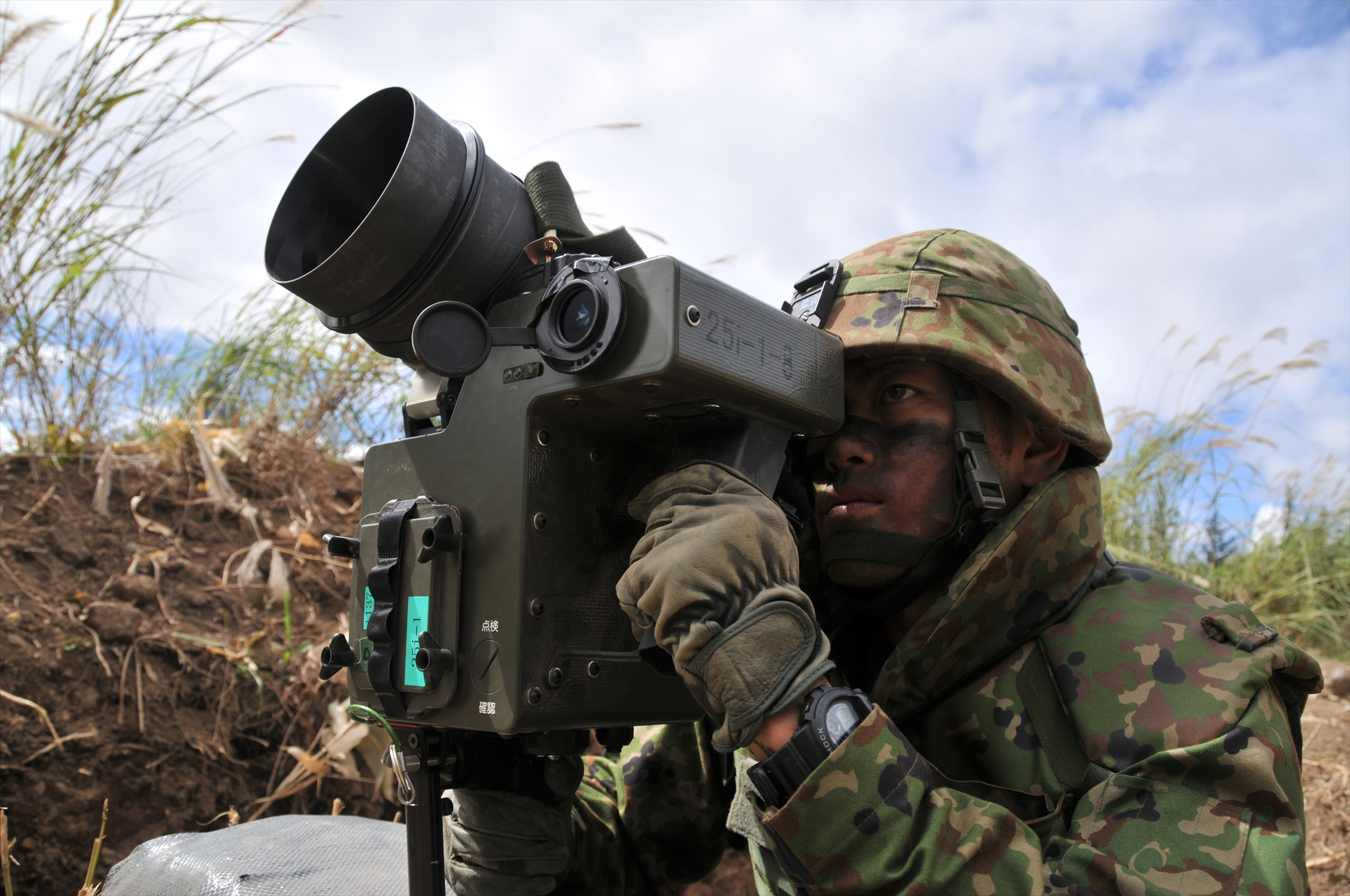
A JGSDF soldier aims the LMAT during a military exercise.

As a replacement was needed for the Sumitomo FT-84 recoilless rifle in front-line service with the Japanese Ground Self-Defense Forces, plans to replace it with an Infrared homing anti-tank missile was commissioned by the Defense Agency's Technical Research and Development Institute. In 1993, Kawasaki Heavy Industries was selected to create the said anti-tank missile system. In trials conducted by the JGSDF, the system was known as the XATM-5. The system was created in the same year with live testing in 1996.

Requirements for the system included portability, usage by a single soldier and design-to-cost technology.

In 2001, after 11 years, it was finally placed into service with the Japanese Ground Self-Defense Forces as the Type 01 LMAT which translates from Japanese to Type 01 light anti-tank guided missile. A report filed by the Ministry of Defense in 2005 called for acquisition of an unknown number of 01 LMAT missile systems among various military items purchased from Kawasaki Heavy Industries for 129,700,000,000 Yen.

=== Design ===
This weapon employs a sophisticated Command Launch Unit (CLU) that is re-loaded for multiple firings. It is not of the disposable (one-shot) type.

The LMAT's missile warhead is tandem HEAT, its two-stage warhead making it effective against ERA protected vehicles.

== Application ==
The Type 01 LMAT, while used for infantry in anti-tank roles, can be mounted on the Komatsu LAV for a mobile anti-tank platform.

== Operators ==
- Japan: 1073 Sets (2010)

== Similar weapons ==
- AT-1K Raybolt – (South Korea)
- FGM-148 Javelin – (United States)
- HJ-12 – (China)
- Akeron MP – (France)
- MPATGM – (India)
- OMTAS – (Turkey)
- Spike-MR/LR – (Israel)

== See also ==
- Type 64 MAT
- Type 79 Jyu-MAT
- Type 87 Chu-MAT
