= UMTAS =

Turkish air-to-surface missile

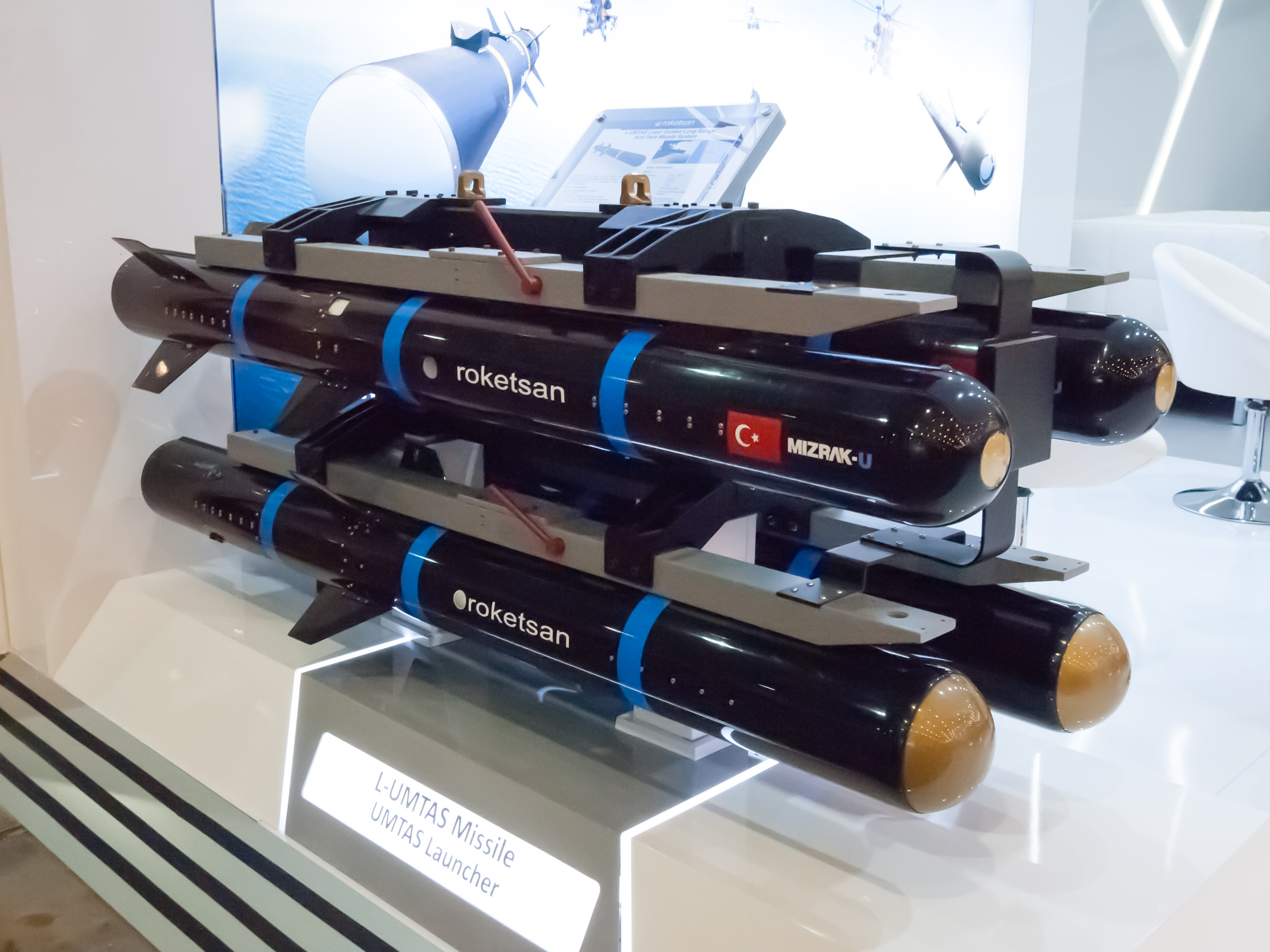
- L-UMTAS (upper) and UMTAS (lower) missiles displayed on helicopter pylon
- Type: Air-to-surface, anti-tank guided missile
- Place of origin: Turkey

Production history
- Designed: 2005-2017
- Manufacturer: Roketsan
- Produced: 2017-current
- Variants: UMTAS; L-UMTAS

Specifications
- Mass: UMTAS/LUMTAS-37.5 kg (83 lb) missile 62 kg (137 lb) launcher UMTAS/LUMTAS-GM-1-41.3 kg (91 lb) missile 25 kg (55 lb) launcher UMTAS-GM-2-60 kg (130 lb) missile 40 kg (88 lb) launcher
- Length: UMTAS/LUMTAS-1.8 m (5 ft 11 in) UMTAS/LUMTAS-GM-1-1.72 m (5 ft 8 in) UMTAS-GM-2-2 m (6 ft 7 in)
- Diameter: UMTAS/LUMTAS-160 mm (6.3 in) UMTAS/LUMTAS-GM-1-160 mm (6.3 in) UMTAS-GM-2-180 mm (7.1 in)
- Warhead: Tandem HEAT / blast-fragmentation / thermobaric
- Detonation mechanism: Impact; Proximity
- Engine: HTPB‐based solid-fuel rocket motor
- Operational range: UMTAS/LUMTAS-500–8,000 m (0.31–4.97 mi) UMTAS/LUMTAS-GM-1-1,000–16,000 m (0.62–9.94 mi) from vehicles, 1,000–32,000 m (0.62–19.88 mi) from aircraft UMTAS-GM-2-1,000–32,000 m (0.62–19.88 mi) from vehicles 1,000–50,000 m (0.62–31.07 mi) from aircraft
- Guidance system: RF data link; Imaging infrared (UMTAS); Semi-active laser (L-UMTAS)
- Launch platform: AH-1W SuperCobra; T129 ATAK; SH-60B Seahawk; TAI Hürkuş; TAI Hürjet; IOMAX Archangel; Mil Mi-8
- References: Janes

External image
- Launch and Warhead test
- Dual-Stage antitank Warhead

UMTAS or Mizrak-U (Uzun Menzilli Tanksavar Sistemi) is a family of modern long range air-to-surface anti-tank guided missile developed by Turkish armor and missile manufacturer Roketsan. It is one of the Turkish-made ATGMs, along with the short-range Karaok, medium-range OMTAS and gun-launched TANOK.

== Background ==
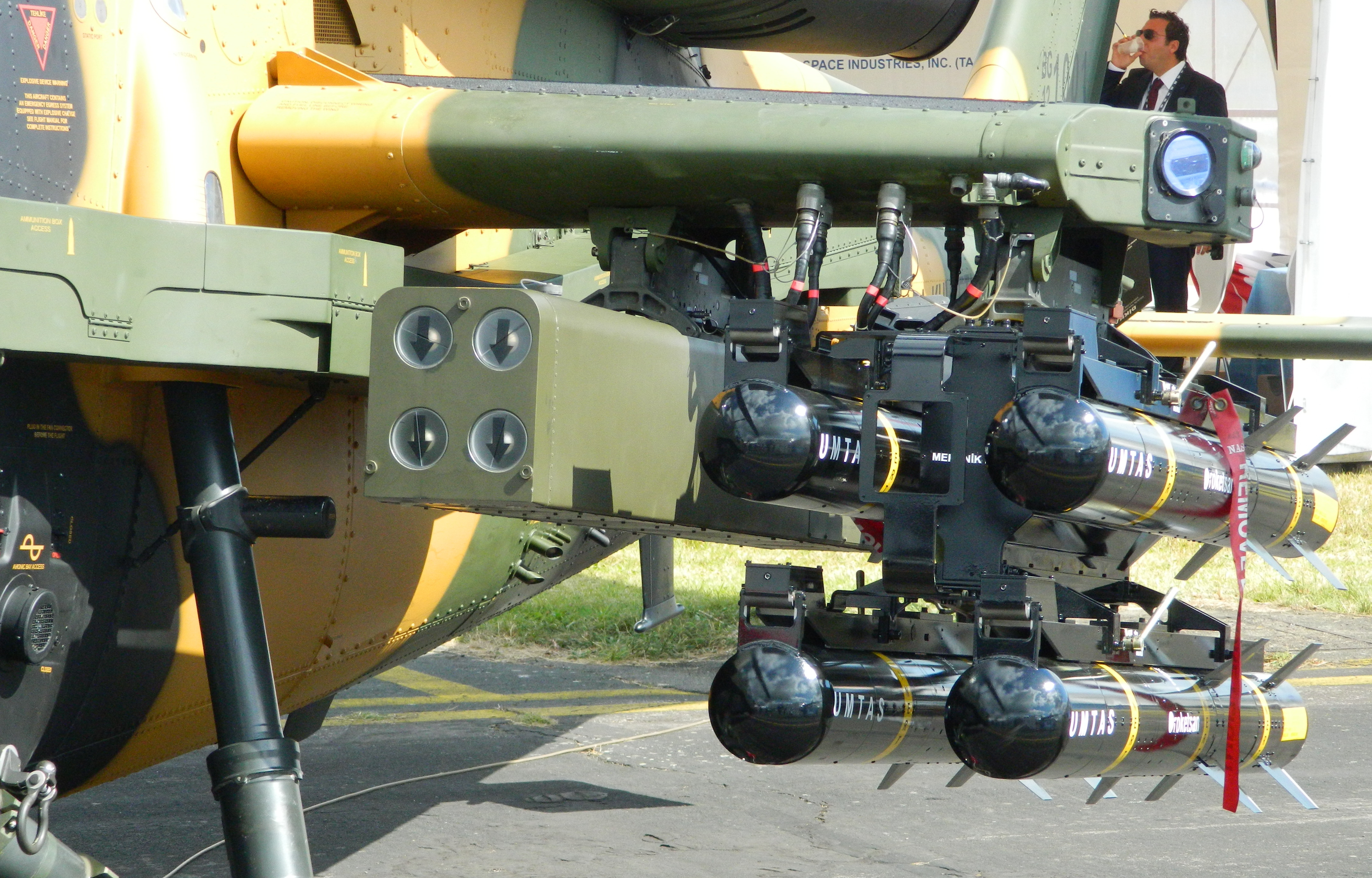
TAI T129 Attack Helicopter armed with UMTAS

The UMTAS program was begun in late 2003 by Turkey's Undersecretariat for Defence Industries (SSM), specifically to provide TAI/AgustaWestland T129 ATAK combat helicopters with an indigenous guided missile. The UMTAS has been designed to engage tanks and heavily armoured vehicles. It can be integrated in various platforms, including helicopters, UAVs, land vehicles, stationary platforms, light assault aircraft, ships.

== Description ==
The UMTAS missile has fire and forget and fire and update infrared guidance with a tandem anti-tank warfare warhead. The laser guided version is marketed as the L-UMTAS.

Abilities:

- Fire behind mask
- Can be used day or night and in adverse weather
- Tandem-charge warhead, effective against reactive armour
- Insensitive munition characteristics against liquid fuel fire and bullet hits
- Communication of seeker image to user and command by user using data-link
- Lock-on before or after launch (L-UMTAS)
- Update of aim point on target (UMTAS)
- Switch targets during flight (UMTAS)
- Direct fire or top attack (UMTAS)
- Fire-and-forget, fire-and-update modes (UMTAS)

== Development ==
Phase 1 (design) began in 2005 and finished in 2008.

Phase 2 (development and qualification) began in 2008 and finished in 2015.

The L-UMTAS and UMTAS version have been integrated and fired successfully from helicopters: a Turkish TAI/AgustaWestland T129 ATAK against land targets, and a US Sikorsky SH-60 Seahawk against sea targets.

A UMTAS was test dropped successfully from a Baykar Bayraktar TB2 unmanned combat aerial vehicle (UCAV). The missile was released at an altitude of 4,900 m (16,000 ft) to hit a 2×2 meter target self laser designated from the drone, from 8 kilometres away. These missile tests may be a step in a related program to use MAM weapons with Bayraktar drones.

The MAM-L smart munition was developed from L-UMTAS.

Serial production has begun with the delivery dates set in 2016.

The Geleceğin Muharebe Sistemi (Future Combat System) version of the missile (UMTAS-GM) was displayed in 2023. UMTAS-GM-1 features dual IIR/SAL seekers in a flat split-design nose with a bidirectional RF datalink in a cylindrical body and an aligned, cruciform fold-out wing and aft fin assembly. It weighs 41.3 kg (91 lb) and can be equipped with an insensitive tandem anti-tank, high-explosive blast fragmentation, or thermobaric warhead. Range is 16 km (9.9 mi) when fired from land vehicles and naval vessels and 20 km (12 mi) from helicopters. UMTAS-GM-2 has the ability to be fired day / night, according to the type of warhead it has. It can be used against main battle tanks, armoured personnel carriers, trucks, all-terrain vehicles, light pillboxes, trenches, buildings, helicopters flying at low altitude.UMTAS-GM-2 also offers the opportunity to shoot from behind the suture by using its propulsion capacity and gliding capability. In this way, the target can be destroyed from safe distances without entering the firing range of enemy elements. With the Hybrid Seeker Head to be located on UMTAS-GM-2, it will be able to provide the user with high-resolution battlefield images at different wavelengths day and night.
