= AT-1K Raybolt =

South Korean anti-tank guided missile

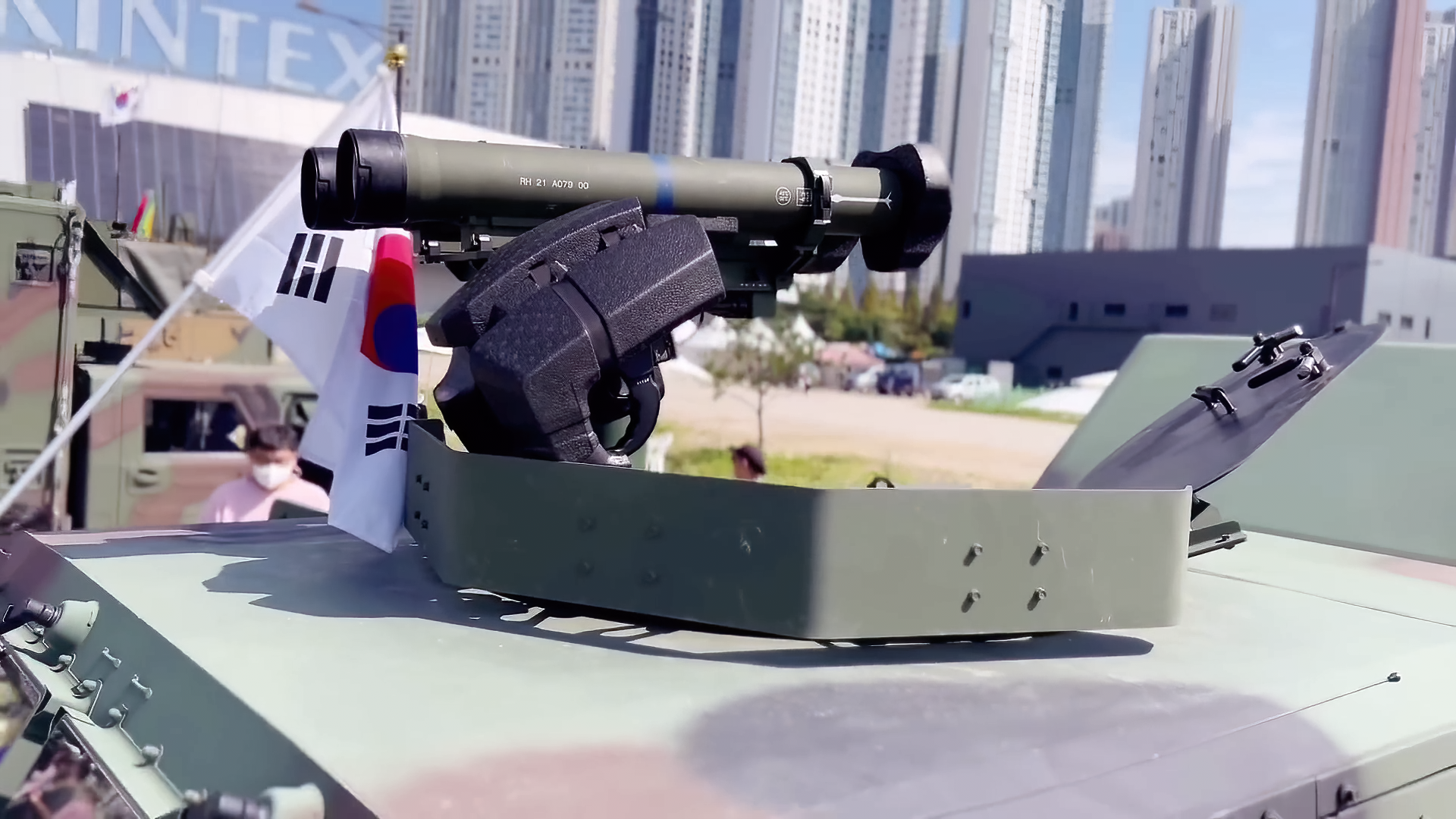
- AT-1K Raybolt launcher mounted on K151C1 light tactical vehicle
- Type: Anti-tank guided missile
- Place of origin: South Korea

Service history
- Used by: See Operators
- Wars: Yemeni Civil War; Second Nagorno-Karabakh War

Production history
- Designer: Agency for Defense Development; Hanwha Defense (launcher); LIG Nex1 (missile)
- Designed: 2007–2015
- Manufacturer: Hanwha Vision (launcher); LIG Defense & Aerospace (missile)
- Produced: 2017–present

Specifications
- Mass: Include launcher: 20 kg (44 lb); Missile: 13 kg (29 lb)
- Crew: 2 (on foot); 1 (vehicle-mounted)
- Maximum firing range: 2,500 m (1.6 mi) – 3,000 m (1.9 mi) (observed)
- Sights: Thermal weapon sight
- Warhead: HEAT
- Detonation mechanism: Contact fuze
- Blast yield: 900 mm (35 in) RHA behind ERA
- Maximum speed: Mach 1.7 (578 m/s; 2,080 km/h)
- Guidance system: Infrared guidance-aided fire-and-forget-
- Launch platform: Man-portable launcher
- Transport: 4×4 K151C1 ATGM Carrier; Rotem KW2 Scorpion Anti-Tank Vehicle

The AT-1K Raybolt (Korean: 현궁 "Hyeon-gung", Hanja: 晛弓) is a South Korean man-portable third-generation anti-tank guided missile manufactured by LIG Defense & Aerospace (LIG D&A). It has fire-and-forget capability using an infrared imaging seeker and has a tandem-warhead to defeat explosive reactive armor. The Raybolt has a top attack and direct attack modes. It is the first ATGM to be built by South Korea and entered mass production in June 2017.

The Raybolt is positioned by its manufacturer as a competitor and peer with the American FGM-148 Javelin and Israeli Spike-MR ATGMs.

The Raybolt was first shown publicly at the Indodefence 2014 exhibition.

== Development ==
Development began in 2007 and began in earnest in 2010, as South Korea's existing anti-tank guided missiles were reaching the end of their 25-year service life. LIG Nex1's priorities during development were world-class performance, weight, export competitiveness through localization of core components, cost-efficiency, and reliability. The development was not completely smooth, and for the first five years there were several failures with "Captive Flight Tests". In a retrospective on the development of the Raybolt, one engineer assessed the greatest challenge as quality assurance. On May 30, 2017, it successfully completed the quality certification test of Raybolt organized by the Defense Acquisition Program Administration (DAPA).

The Raybolt was developed to replace obsolete anti-tank weapons, such as recoilless rifles and TOW missiles. South Korea's 1970s-vintage TOW missiles lacked tandem-warheads and would not be able to destroy modern North Korean tanks equipped with explosive reactive armor (ERA).

The Raybolt is produced by LIG Nex1 (now LIG Defense & Aerospace) in cooperation with South Korea's Agency for Defense Development (ADD), under the auspices of the DAPA. About 95% of the Raybolt is made in South Korea.

The Raybolt underwent successful test evaluations in Saudi Arabia in December 2013 and January 2014. The Raybolt contract is expected to be worth 1 trillion won through till 2023.

== Components ==
The Raybolt's most notable feature is an imaging infrared seeker providing fire-and-forget capability. It also has a tandem-warhead and both direct attack and top attack modes. The Raybolt uses a smokeless propellant and can be fired from within a building. The Raybolt missile and Observation and Launch Unit (OLU) can either be vehicle-mounted or carried as a manpack by two men. There are also discussions to mount the Raybolt on helicopters. The OLU has day/night capability via a thermal sight. The missile uses a soft launch to escape the barrel before activating the main flight motor. It is scheduled to be acquired over the 2018–2022 timeframe.

The Raybolt system weight about 20 kg (44 lb), which its manufacturer describes as lighter than peers. The Raybolt's range is 2.4 or 3 km. The Raybolt's HEAT tandem warhead can penetrate 900 mm of RHA beyond defeating ERA, which is described as "excellent performance" by DAPA.

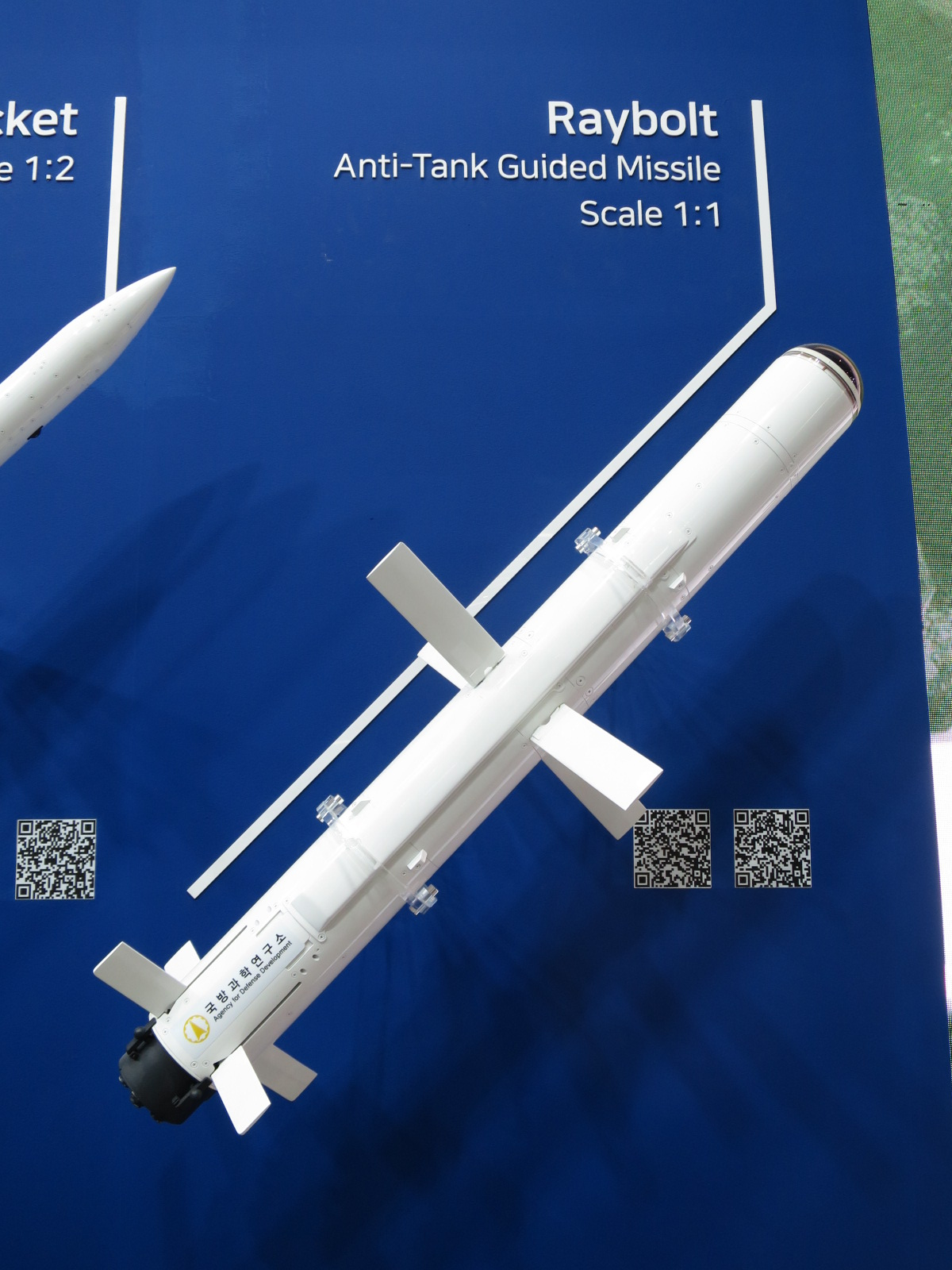
AT-1K missile

The Raybolt has been marketed to India. Park Tae-sik, senior manager at LIG Nex1, also reports interest from South America.

The missile can be carried by a two-man crew or fitted to fire from vehicles. The South Korean Army uses an anti-tank version of the Kia Motors 4×4 Light Tactical Vehicle (LTV) called the K-153C; the roof is equipped with a launcher turret with two missiles ready to fire and four additional missiles carried inside the vehicle.

=== Launch platforms ===
- Man-portable launcher
- 4×4 K151C1 ATGM Carrier
- Rotem KW2 Scorpion Anti-Tank Vehicle

== Combat history ==
The Raybolt was delivered to the Republic of Korea Armed Forces in 2017. It will be used by the Korean Army and the ROK Marine Corps.

In 2018, the Raybolt was used in the Yemeni Civil War by the Royal Saudi Armed Forces against the Houthis.

== Operators ==
AT-1K Raybolt operators

- Azerbaijan
- Philippines
- Saudi Arabia
- South Korea
- United Arab Emirates

=== Future ===
- Indonesia

== See also ==
- Akeron MP – (France)
- FGM-148 Javelin – (United States)
- HJ-12 – (China)
- MPATGM – (India)
- OMTAS – (Turkey)
- Type 01 LMAT – (Japan)
