= GAM-10X =

Chinese air-to-ground missile

- Type: Anti-tank missile Surface-to-surface missile Surface-to-air missile
- Place of origin: China

Service history
- Used by: See Operators
- Wars: 2025 Cambodia–Thailand conflict

Production history
- Produced: 2016–present
- Variants: See: § Variants

Specifications
- Mass: 13 kg (GAM-100)
- Length: 1,200 mm (GAM-100)
- Crew: 1 or 2
- Muzzle velocity: 170 m/s (560 ft/s)
- Effective firing range: 200–2,500 m (GAM-100); 300–4,000 m (GAM-102)
- Sights: Optical sight & thermal imaging
- Detonation mechanism: Contact fuze
- Blast yield: 800 mm (31 in)
- Propellant: Solid-fuel
- Guidance system: Infrared homing
- Launch platform: Man-portable launcher

The GAM-10X is a family of Chinese fire-and-forget infrared homing anti-tank missile exported by Poly Technologies. The missile series was revealed in 2016. The GAM-10X has several variants, including the GAM-100, the GAM-101, and GAM-102.

== Design ==
The GAM-100 is a small, short-range missile with a range of 200–2,500 m (660–8,200 ft), a weight of 13 kg (29 lb), and a length of 1,200 mm (47 in). The missile is designed for shoulder-fired infantry operation, and has a soft-launch mechanism, an infrared (IR) homing seeker, a muzzle velocity of 170 m/s (560 ft/s), a top-attack trajectory, and a penetration value of 800 mm (31 in). The whole system weighs less than 20 kg (44 lb) and is considered a lighter and cheaper alternative to the HJ-12 missile in the PLA inventory.

=== Variants ===
The GAM-100 is used for defeating armored vehicles. This variant is used by infantry for short-range missions.

The GAM-101 is the air-to-ground variant of the GAM-100.

The GAM-102 is a larger version of the GAM-100 for mounting on vehicle platforms. The GAM-102 has an increased penetration value of 1,000 mm (39 in), a range of 4,000 m (13,000 ft), and can be launched via vehicles or a tube-based launch system supported by a tripod.

The GAM-102LR is a variant of GAM-102 with enhanced range. In 2018, an anti-tank system with GAM-102 missiles, optical sensors, and Dongfeng Mengshi chassis was displayed at the Zhuhai Airshow 2018.

== Operational history ==
During 2025 Cambodian-Thai conflict, Thai Forces captured multiple GAM-102s (2016 version), not GAM-102 LR (5th generation) during fighting near Hill 677, (Note: Some Thai media sources report the place as Hill 500.) according to recent reports from the area. It remains unknown if any GAM-102s were actually used in combat during the fighting.

== Operators ==
- Armenia: First shown to the public in a May 2026 military parade.
- Cambodia: Reported by the Thai government that GAM-102s were delivered to Cambodia, according to Chinese confirmation.
- China: Reported to be used by the PLA.
