= TANOK =

Gun-launched anti-tank missile

- Type: Gun-launched anti-tank missile
- Place of origin: Turkey

Service history
- Used by: Turkey

Production history
- Designer: Roketsan
- Designed: 2019
- Manufacturer: Roketsan
- Produced: 2019–present

Specifications
- Mass: 11 kg
- Length: 984 mm
- Diameter: 120 mm
- Warhead: Armour piercing tandem
- Operational range: 1,000 m - 6,000 m
- Guidance system: Semi-active laser homing
- Launch platform: 120 mm guns (including MKE 120 MM 55C tank gun)
- Transport: Tanks, land vehicles

TANOK is a 120 mm gun-launched laser-guided anti-tank missile developed by Roketsan. It is designed to be fired from standard tank guns without requiring modifications and is intended to give tanks a guided anti-armor capability at extended ranges. It is one of the Turkish-made ATGMs, along with the short-range Karaok, medium-range OMTAS and long-range UMTAS.

== Development ==
TANOK was publicly unveiled by Roketsan at the 14th International Defence Industry Fair (IDEF 2019) in Istanbul. It was presented as part of Roketsan's move into tank munitions, expanding beyond missile systems into gun-launched guided weapons.

== Design ==
TANOK is a laser-guided 120 mm anti-tank round that uses semi-active laser guidance to engage stationary or moving targets. The missile follows a coded laser beam projected by a designator mounted on the firing tank or another platform.

The missile supports both direct-attack and top-attack profiles, allowing it to strike armored vehicles from above as well as along a flat trajectory. It is designed for use with standard 120 mm tank guns and was developed for integration with Turkish main battle tanks, including the Altay.

The TANOK missile is guided by a semi-active laser (SAL) seeker, which is cited to provide a high probability of hitting both stationary and moving targets throughout its operational range. It carries a tandem anti-tank warhead and is designed to strike targets using both direct-attack and top-attack profiles; the latter mode is intended to exploit the typically less protected top armor of heavy armored vehicles and fortifications. The missile is primarily designed to be fired from 120 mm tank cannons without requiring modifications, and its soft-launch system also allows it to be deployed from various other land-based and portable platforms.

== Operators ==
- Turkey
