= Fire-and-forget =

Type of missile guidance

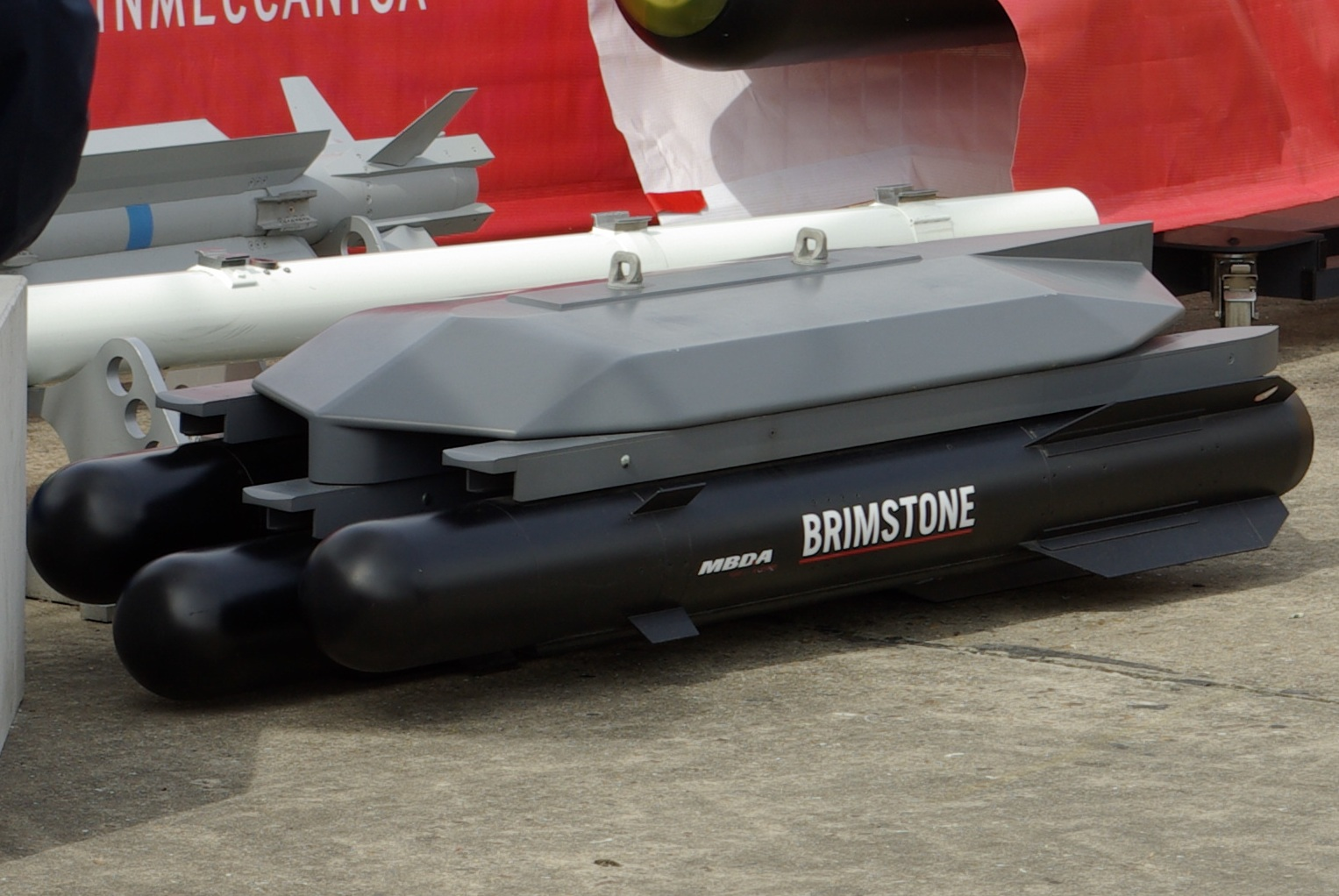
The RAF's Brimstone missile is a fire-and-forget anti-tank missile.

Fire-and-forget is a type of missile guidance which does not require further external intervention after launch such as illumination of the target or wire guidance, and can hit its target without the launcher being in line-of-sight of the target. This is an important property for a guided weapon to have, since a person or vehicle that lingers near the target to guide the missile (using, for instance, a laser designator) is vulnerable to attack and unable to carry out other tasks.

Generally, information about the target is programmed into the missile just prior to launch. This can include coordinates, radar measurements (including velocity), or an infrared image of the target. After it is fired, the missile guides itself by some combination of gyroscopes and accelerometers, GPS, onboard active radar homing, infrared homing optics, and anti-radiation homing. Some systems offer the option of either continued input from the launch platform or fire-and-forget.

Fire-and-forget missiles can be vulnerable to soft-kill systems on modern main battle tanks, in addition to existing hard-kill systems. As opposed to unguided RPGs which require a hard-kill system (a counter projectile(s) used to destroy the incoming missile), fire-and-forget missiles can often be jammed by means such as electro-optical dazzlers.

== Examples ==
Many of these are infrared homing missiles; some of the remainder (e.g. AIM-120) are active radar guided.

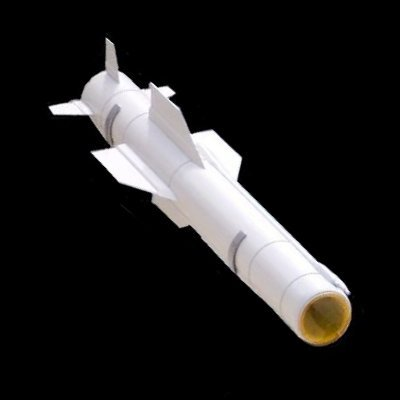
Modern PARS 3 LR fire-and-forget missile of the German Army

- AGM-84H/K SLAM-ER
- AAM-4 (Type 99 AAM)
- AASM HAMMER
  (SBU-38, -54, -64)
- Akeron MP
- AT-1K Raybolt
- AGM-65 Maverick
- AGM-84 Harpoon
- AGM-114L Longbow Hellfire
- AIM-9 Sidewinder
- AIM-54 Phoenix
- AIM-120 AMRAAM
- Akash missile
- Astra missile
- Brimstone
- BrahMos
- EXACTO
- AM39 Exocet
- FGM-148 Javelin
- FIM-92 Stinger
- Firestreak (1959–1988; British tail-chase infrared AAM fitted to Sea Vixen, Javelin, Lightning.)
- Hermes (missile)
- Sosna-R
- HJ-9A
- IRIS-T
- Roketsan KARAOK
- Kh-25 (Soviet Union)
- Kh-29D
- Kh-35
- Kh-59
- LFK NG
- MICA
- MPATGM
- Nag
- OMTAS
- PARS 3 LR
- PL-12
- RBS 15
- Red Dean (1950s British active-radar AAM. Early trial firings only; cancelled before service entry.)
- Red Top (1964–1988; British all-aspect infrared-homing missile fitted to Sea Vixen and Lightning.)
- Roketsan UMTAS
- RIM-66 Standard SM2, blocks IIIB and IVA only
- RIM-174 Standard ERAM
- Spike (missile)
- SRAW Predator Antitank Missile
- TAipers
- Type 01 LMAT
- TUBITAK-SAGE SOM (missile) (Turkey)
- Vympel R-27
- Vympel R-73
- Vympel R-77
- FN-6
- Kornet-EM
- 9M123 Khrizantema
- 9K333 Verba
- P-800 Oniks
- 3M-54 Kalibr
- Skif (ATGM)
- Shershen
- HJ-12
- Nag/Prospina

== See also ==
- Precision-guided munition
- Command guidance
