= Akeron MP =

French-made portable fire-and-forget anti-tank missile

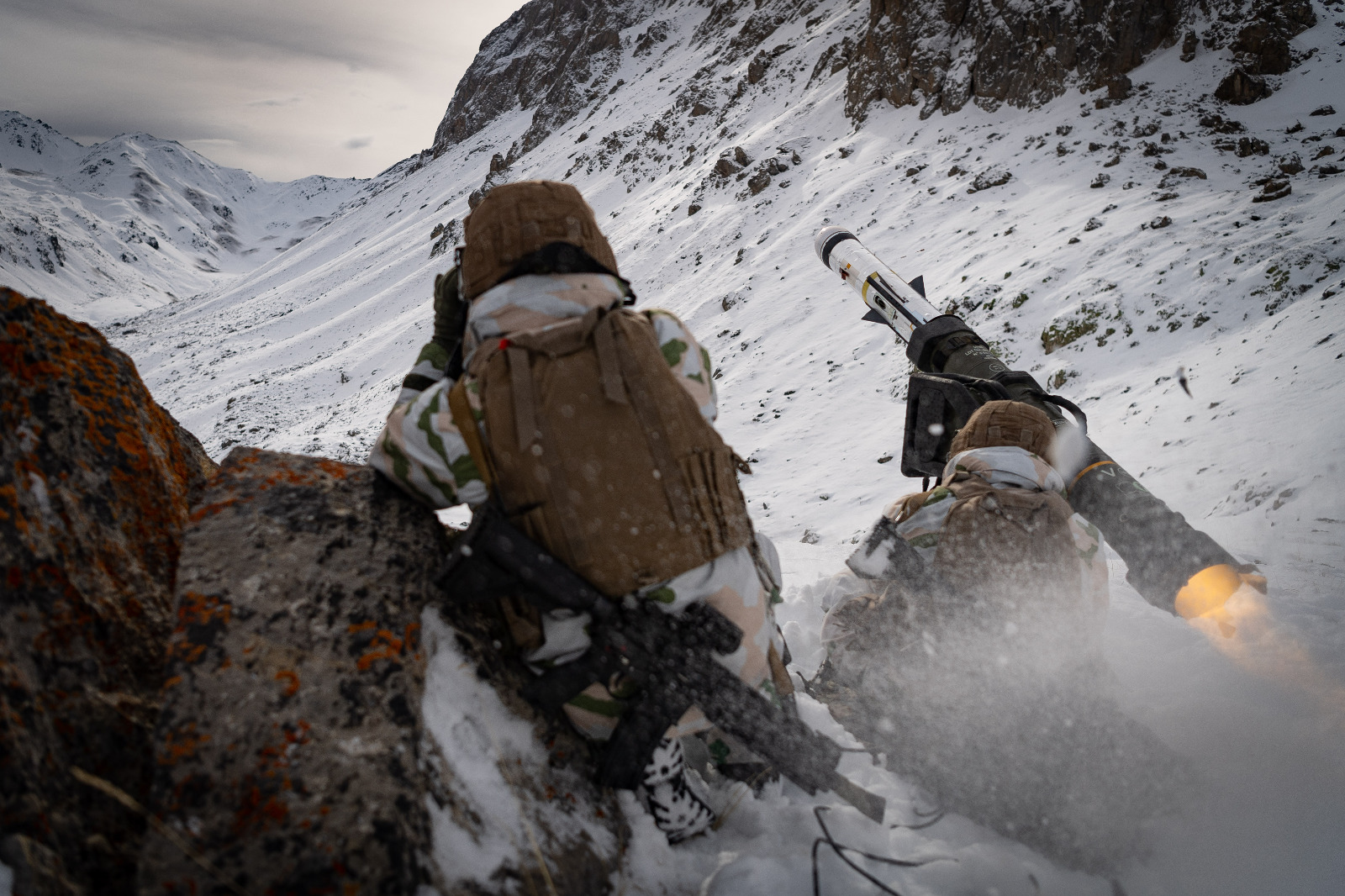
- An Akeron MP system of the French Army 27th Mountain Infantry Brigade during Exercise Cerces 22 (French Alps, 2022)
- Type: Anti-tank guided missile Surface-to-surface missile
- Place of origin: France

Service history
- In service: 2018 – present
- Used by: See operators

Production history
- Designed: 2010 – 2015
- Manufacturer: MBDA France
- Produced: 2016 – present
- No. built: 400 launch units and 3,000 missiles ordered for the French Armed Forces as of November 2023 (total export numbers difficult to assess)

Specifications
- Mass: Missile: 15 kg (33 lb), launch tube included Firing post: 11 kg (24 lb), tripod and battery included
- Length: 1.3 m (4.3 ft) in tactical canister
- Diameter: 140 mm (5.5 in)
- Warhead: Tandem HEAT
- Blast yield: Can penetrate 1,000 mm of RHA; Can penetrate 2,000 mm of concrete
- Engine: solid-fuel rocket, two-phase thrust (soft launch)
- Operational range: 150 m – 5 km
- Guidance system: infrared homing and television guidance
- Launch platform: Tripod (man-portable); Combat vehicles; Naval vessels

The Akeron MP (Akeron Moyenne Portée), formerly known as MMP (French: Missile Moyenne Portée, lit. 'medium-range missile') is a French fifth generation man-portable anti-tank guided missile system. Featuring a fire-and-forget capability, it also integrates command guidance in both lock-on before launch (LOBL) and lock-on after launch (LOAL) firing modes for visible targets and non-line-of-sight use respectively. The latter two modes incorporate retargeting, i.e. the ability to redirect the missile in flight towards another target such as an unexpected threat or a new and more valuable enemy asset spotted, as well as aim point selection and mission abort features.

The Akeron MP entered operational service with the French army in 2018 and was developed by MBDA France to replace the Franco-German MILAN and American FGM-148 Javelin. Designed to primarily equip infantry units, this all-weather day and night system incorporates a multi-purpose missile with anti-tank, anti-infrastructure and anti-personnel selectable modes; it has a range of up to 5 km. The missile can also be integrated on combat vehicles or naval vessels, and is notably expected to arm French armoured vehicles such as the EBRC Jaguar, Griffon MMP and Serval MMP.

A long-range, air-launched missile of the same family, the Akeron LP (Akeron Longue Portée), is also under development. It is intended to equip the upcoming French Eurocopter Tiger MkIII.

== Background ==
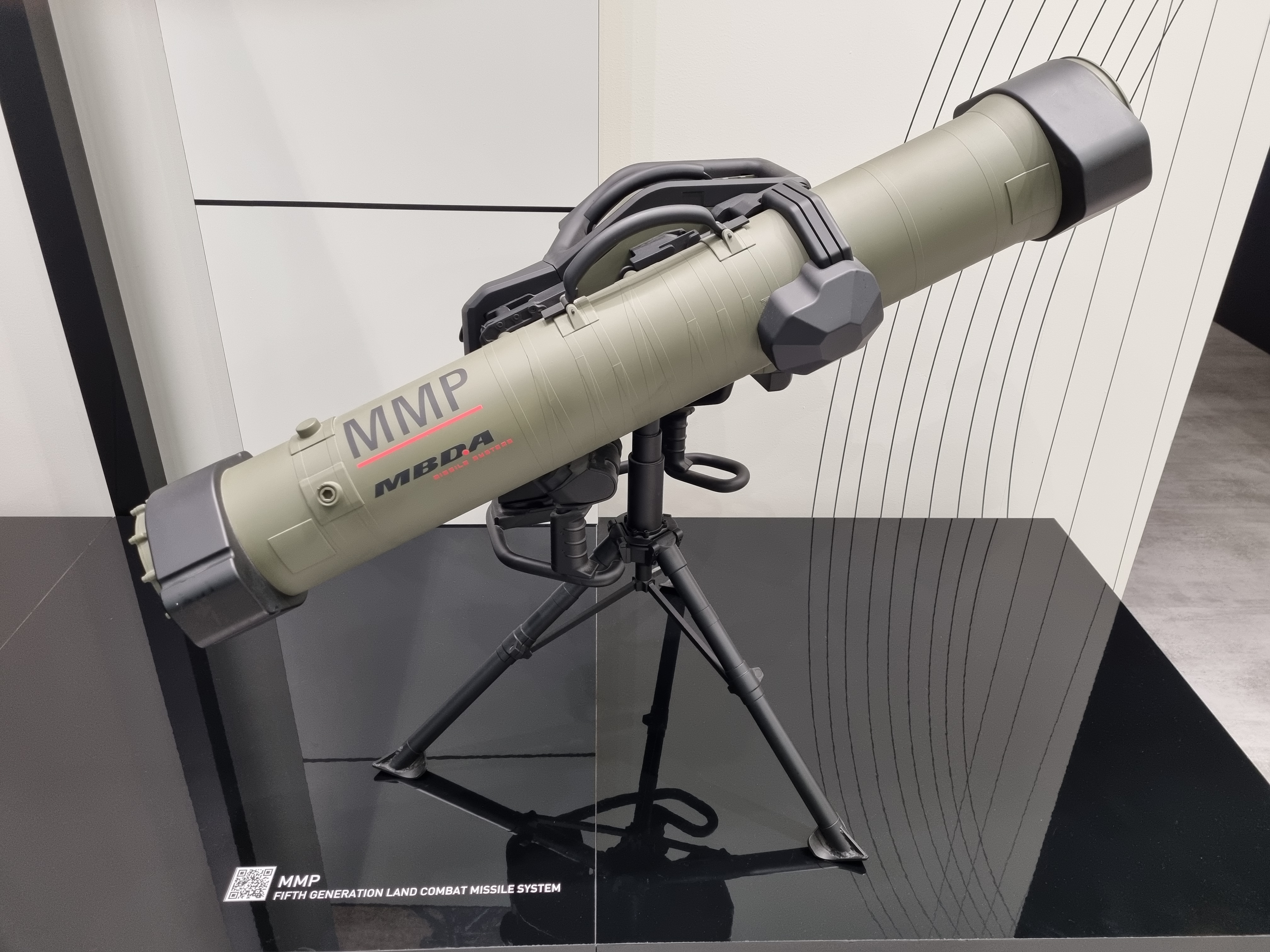
Akeron MP system on display (Dubai Airshow, 2021)

The MMP programme originated in 2009 to develop a successor to MBDA's forty-year-old MILAN. This was particularly in response to a French urgent operational requirement which had also led to the purchase of the US-made Javelin in 2010, rather than additional MILAN missiles; 260 Javelins were ordered because of the missile's fire-and-forget capability. MBDA's improved MILAN-ER offer was rejected because it lacked such a feature. The UK, previously a major user of the MILAN system, had also converted to Javelin.

In 2011, the requirement set by the French Army called for a multipurpose precision strike capability to equip the frontline units as well as special operation forces. The missile to be procured had to be able to destroy ground targets, fixed or moving, from light vehicles up to the latest generation MBTs, as well as personnel whether dismounted or protected behind fortifications. The firing officer had to be protected during the engagement, therefore requiring ease of operation, fire and forget guidance and a capability to fire the missile from confined spaces.

After competing against the Lockheed Martin/Raytheon Javelin and Rafael Spike, an order was placed in December 2013 by the French DGA to begin equipping the French Army with the MMP in 2017. Tests began in early 2014, with warhead tests against MBT armour and were pursued in April with launches in a test tunnel to confirm missile safety for the operating crew. MMP was displayed at Eurosatory 2014.

The first firing trial of the MMP was carried out by the DGA in its Bourges facilities on 3 February 2015, with the missile hitting a fixed target at a range of over 4,000 meters.

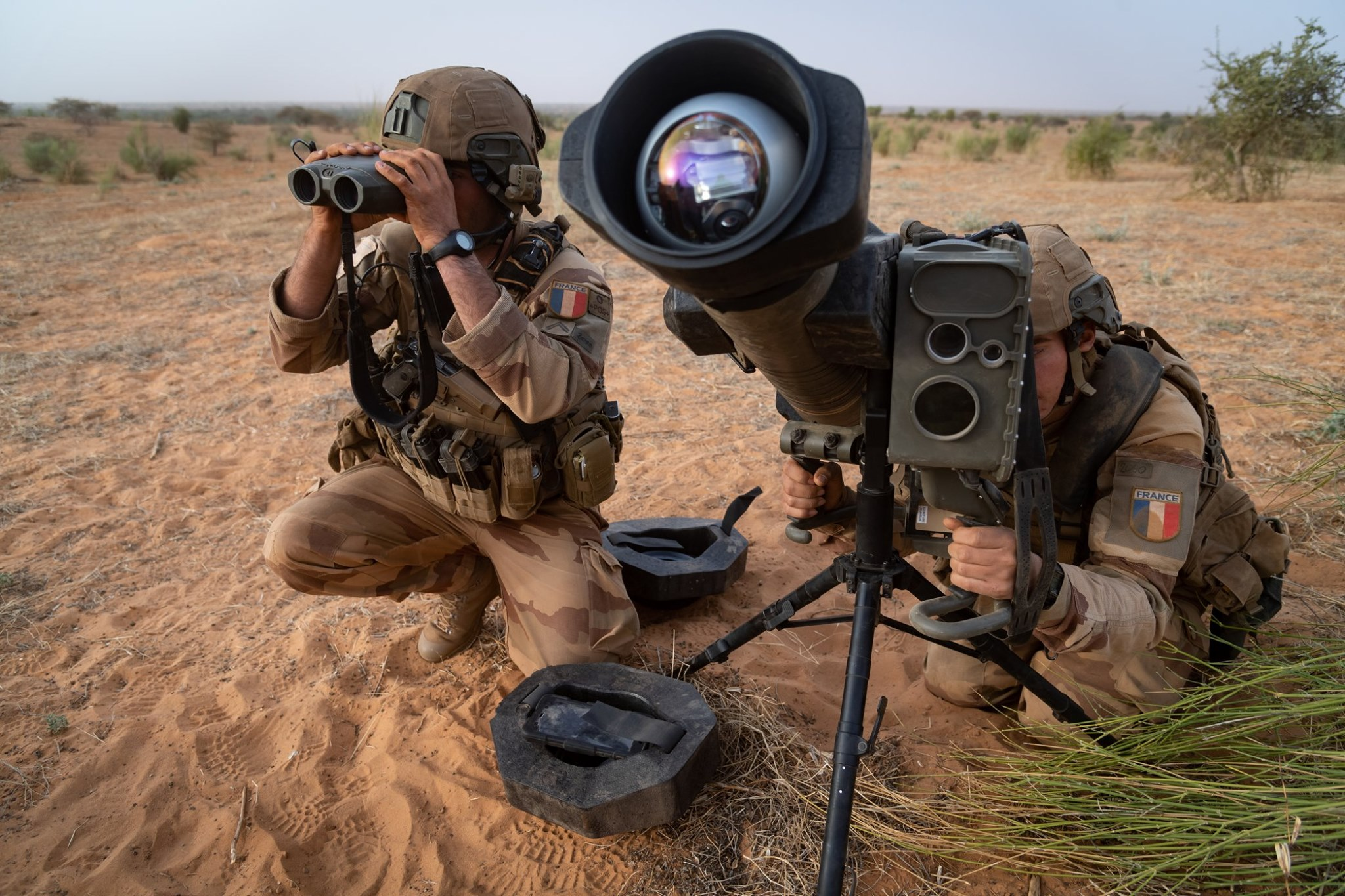
French soldiers equipped with an Akeron MP system in the Sahel (2020)

The development programme had been funded privately by MBDA, and scheduled to be completed by 2017. On 29 November 2017, the DGA announced the delivery of a first batch of 20 firing posts and 50 MMP missiles after a successful operational evaluation firing campaign held by the French Army. The first units will be used for training ahead of deployment in 2018. Initial plans in the 2014-2019 French Military Programming Law (LPM) were for 400 firing posts and 1,750 missiles to be delivered to the French Army's infantry and cavalry units as well as special forces of all military branches by 2025. In the following 2019-2025 LPM, the target was raised to 1,950 missiles and finally, in the 2024-2030 LPM, to around 3,000 missiles.

In addition to replacing the MILAN and the Javelin systems, the Akeron MP will also equip the EBRC Jaguar, which will succeed the HOT missile-armed VAB Mephisto in French service.

== Description ==
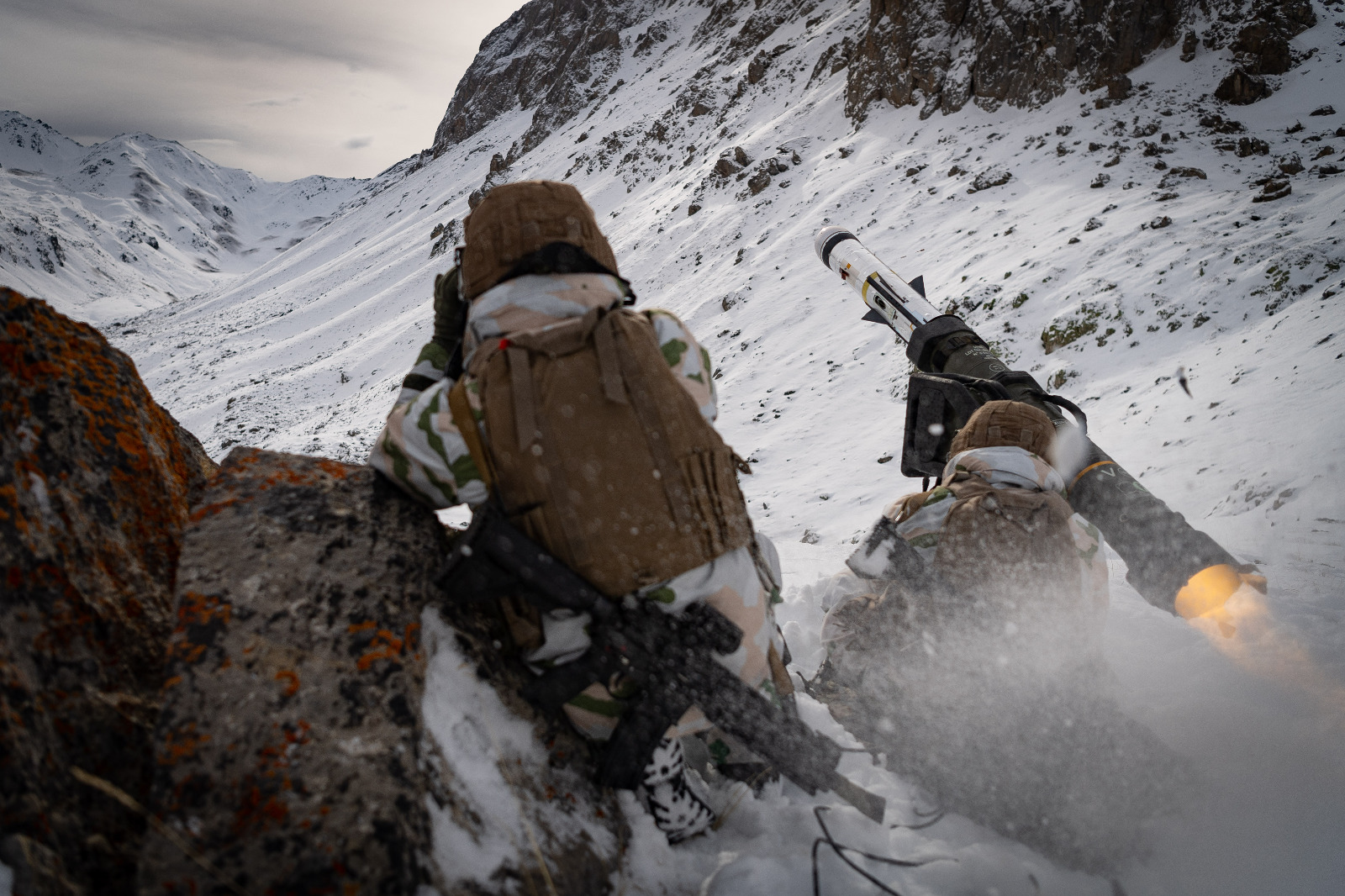
An Akeron MP system of the French Army 27th Mountain Infantry Brigade during Exercise Cerces 22 (French Alps, 2022)

The MMP was designed to overcome some of MILAN's limitations in the context of small-scale and counter-insurgency operations post-2000, rather than the Cold War tank war of the original MILAN requirement. In theatres such as Iraq and Afghanistan, man-portable missile were often used against strongpoints and improvised armour within populated areas. Reducing collateral damage to nearby civilians became a major political factor in such campaigns.

Particular developments over existing missiles were for it to be safe for operators within a confined space, i.e. reduced backblast on launch, and for improved guidance that could target non-IR-emissive (cold) targets as well as AFVs with a reduced risk of collateral damage. Compared to its predecessors it contains a great deal of modern and COTS electronics, rather than the previously slow-moving development of military procurement.

The missile and its guidance system offer three different firing modes:

- Fire-and-forget
- Lock-on before launch with man-in-the-loop
- Lock-on after launch (LOAL) with man-in-the-loop for non-line-of-sight (NLOS) with third party target designation

Despite these new features, it was still to remain effective against modern AFV and MBT armour. A tandem warhead is used, making it effective against conventional, composite and reactive armour. Upon detonation, the warhead also sprays 1,500 tungsten splinters, effective against personnel out to 15 metres (49 ft).

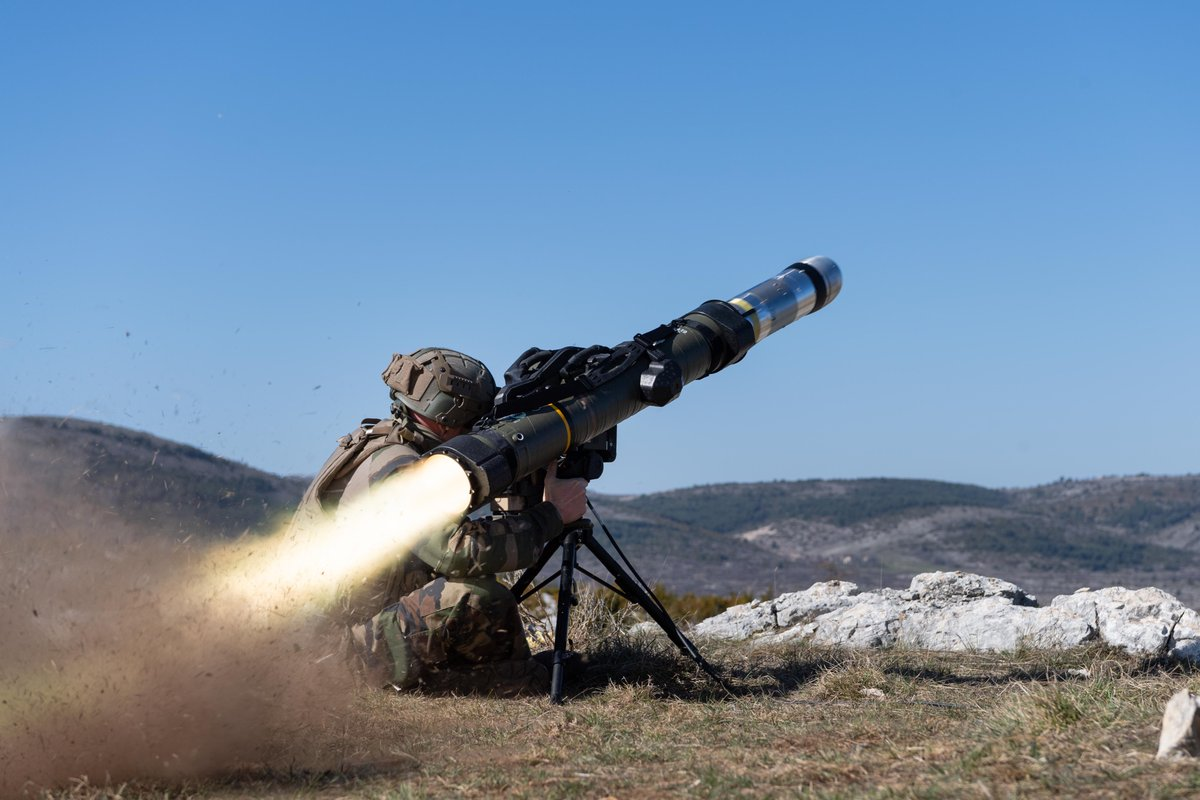
An AKERON MP missile being launched.

At commercial launch, MBDA introduced the MMP as the first land combat missile of 5th generation thanks to the following key features:

- A dual-band seeker in both IR and visible low-light video, enabling the engagement of hot and cold targets in all visibility conditions. The IR sensor is not cooled, which would restrict some performance for an anti-aircraft missile but is a major simplification for an infantry missile. In particular it avoids relying on a pressurized gas supply which would need to be replenished at depot level. Unlike some missiles, such as Stinger, with gas-cooled IR sensors or one-shot thermal batteries, MMP may be locked-on to potential targets repeatedly without consuming resources. These two sensors are mounted on a reversible axis in the dome, with the operator selecting which sensor mode to deploy before launch. In comparison with the classic side-by-side dual sensors, this arrangement provides a much wider field of view allowing the seeker to keep targets, especially fast moving ones, within the missile's field of view thereby greatly easing after launch lock-on.
- Also dual mode, the firing post of the initial infantry version features a high resolution infrared cooled sensor and a daylight TV camera. These sensors high quality support all weather reconnaissance and threat evaluation functions. A fibre optics data link links from the missile presents the seeker images back to the firing station for Man In The Loop control. This also allows a launch to be aborted without detonation, should a collateral civilian suddenly obscure the target. For direct fires, the seeker is locked on before launch thanks to an automatic correlation with the firing post images, which secures and simplifies seeker lock on especially on targets at maximum range. This firing post also features a GPS receiver, a compass and an optional laser range finder which allows full netcentricity and exchange of target coordinates through tactical datalinks for third party target designation.
- The missile integrates an Inertial Measurement Unit (IMU), which is new in this class of light missiles, developed in MEMS (Micro Electro Mechanical Systems) Technology. Together with the fiber optic data link, this IMU allows in flight targeting and re-targeting for lock on after launch (LOAL) operations and also authorizes two selectable trajectory options: low altitude with direct attack or top attack for targeting main battle tanks (MBT) through their turret, which is their weakest point.
- Weighing just over two kilograms (4.4 lb), MMP's new 115 mm caliber multipurpose warhead features a tandem charge – precursor charge positioned forward of the main rocket motor, main charge positioned behind the motor – with two selectable modes, anti-armour and anti-infrastructure. In anti-armour mode it can penetrate over 1,000 millimetres (39 in) of RHA (Rolled Homogenous Armour) under ERA (Explosive Reactive Armour). In anti-infrastructure mode, it's able to breach over two metres (6.6 ft) of reinforced concrete. Both modes also feature an anti-personnel capability. This warhead was designed by Saab Bofors Dynamics Switzerland (formerly RUAG Warheads) which is producing it now (and designed / produces the warhead of the NLAW).
- Lightweight, and easily man-portable. The missile measures 1,300 millimetres (51 in) in length for a 140 millimetres (5.5 in) caliber. The complete round weighs 15 kilograms (33 lb) including its tactical canister. The firing post weighs 11 kilograms (24 lb), including its tripod and battery. The first missiles supplied are man-portable, but vehicle mounts are in development.
- Safe firing from confined spaces, with reduced blast both behind and forward of the launcher. The missile may be launched with infantry in close proximity ahead.
- Minimizing risk of collateral damage.

The missile has a range of 4,000 metres (4,400 yd) as per the French requirement, but in May 2018 two test firings were able to hit targets at 5,000 metres (5,500 yd).

== Evolution of the program ==
At Eurosatory 2016, MBDA also unveiled its new IMPACT turret. This 250 kg motorized turret was presented on a Dagger, a small armored vehicle produced by Renault Trucks Defense. It carries the day/night sensors of the MMP fire control, as well as two ready-to-fire missiles and a 7.62 mm machine gun and its ammunition for self-defense.

In 2017, MBDA offered its MMP to the Australian Defence Force as an integrated ATGW on both the Boxer (on the 30 mm Lance turret) and the BAE Systems AMV35 vehicles (on the 35 mm BAE Hägglunds turret) under the Australian Army's LAND 400 program. The missile is also being offered with its Infantry Firing Post for the Army's LAND 4108 program, which is seeking a replacement to the in-service Javelin ATGW.

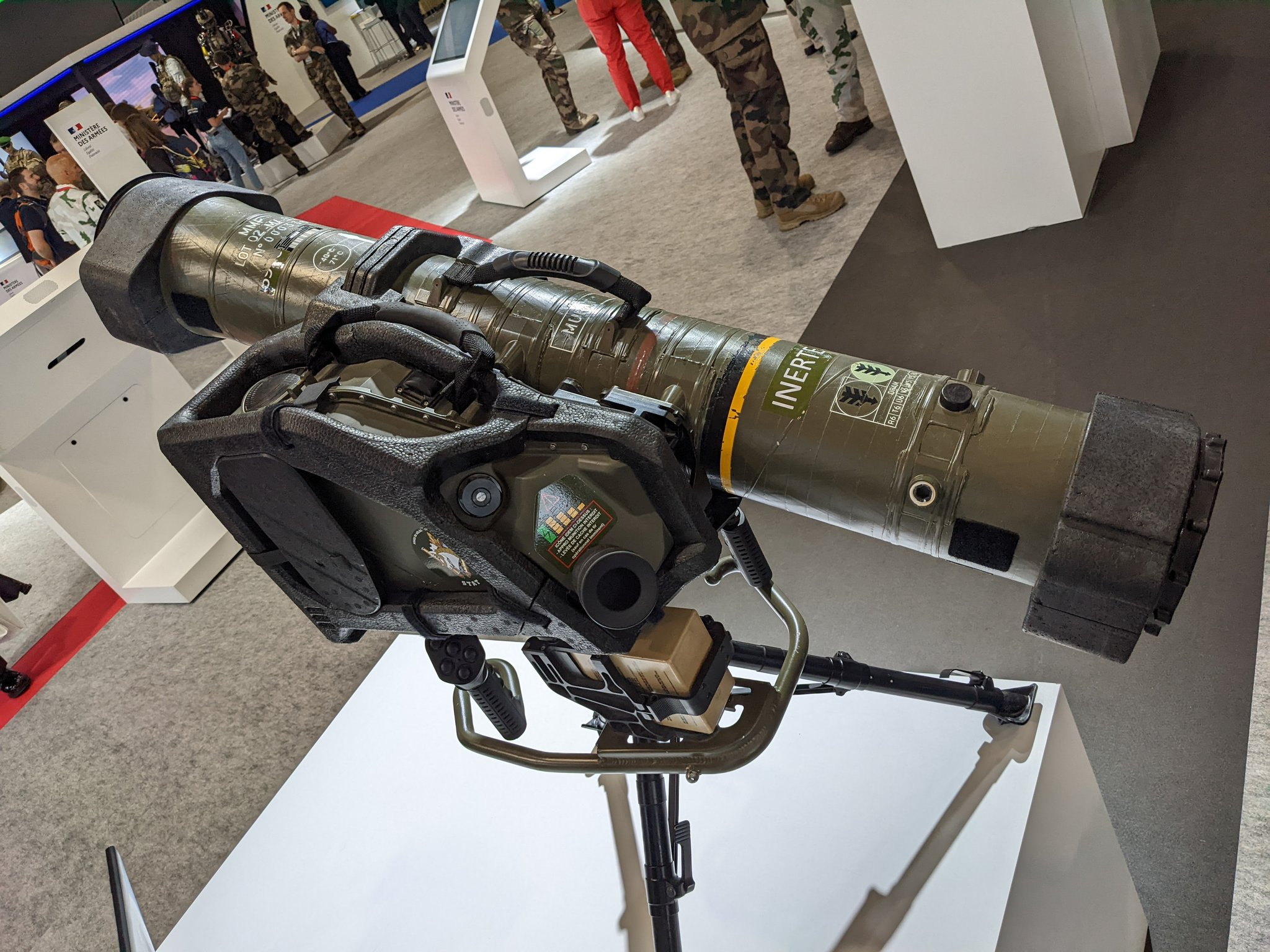
Akeron MP system on display (Eurosatory 2022)

At Eurosatory 2018, the French Army's new Jaguar reconnaissance vehicle was unveiled with a pod of two MMP integrated next to the turret. During the exhibition, MBDA and Milrem Robotics also announced the start of feasibility studies of an “anti-tank unmanned ground vehicle”. The joint project integrates the Milrem Robotics THeMIS unmanned ground vehicle with the MBDA IMPACT (Integrated MMP Precision Attack Combat Turret) system fitted with two MMP.

In August and September 2018, the French Army conducted a firing campaign in Djibouti in order to test the ability of the missile to operate in a desert environment. According to the government, nine MMP were successfully fired. Two of them were fired by the commandos from an ECUME rigid hulled inflatable boat (RHIB). The missiles were integrated in a stabilised and teleoperated turret, thus opening the way to a naval version of the MMP.

In December, the Picardy Battle Group conducted an operation in the three-border region in the south-east of Mali, during which the MMP was deployed and used for the first time in a combat theatre.

In early 2019, MBDA, the DGA and the STAT organised another firing campaign in order to test the performance of the MMP in cold conditions. They performed three successful firings in Sweden with temperature reaching −30 °C.

== Franco-Swedish cooperation ==
In July 2021, the Direction Générale de l'Armement (DGA) signed a letter of intent with the Swedish Defence Materiel Administration (Försvarets materielverk or FMV) to cooperate on a new anti-tank system. A bilateral framework agreement was subsequently signed in April 2023 to enable joint studies, acquisitions and further development of the Akeron MP system for the French and Swedish Armed Forces. This will see the Akeron MP selected as the "RBS 58" in Swedish service, replacing the RBS 56 BILL. Saab will be MBDA's Swedish partner for the contract. The objective is to implement a joint capability roadmap in order to develop new functionalities associated in particular with beyond line-of-sight firing, and also to prepare the missile to address the future generation of targets that will arrive on the battlefield.

== Operators ==
=== Current operators ===
Egypt
In service with the Egyptian Navy special forces. The number of firing posts and missiles procured is unknown.
France
400 firing posts and 1,750 Akeron MP missiles originally planned under the 2014-2019 Military Programming Law and to be delivered between 2017 and 2025. The French Army received a first batch of 50 MMP missiles and 20 firing posts in November 2017; these were intended for initiative training. The number of missiles to be ordered in total was increased to 1,950 in the 2019-2025 Military Programming Law. The 1000th missile was delivered in November 2021. 200 additional missiles ordered in December 2022 and 1,300 more in November 2023. The final target, which initially amounted to 1,950 Akeron MP missiles under the 2019-2025 Military Programming Law, has now seemingly risen to around 3,000. On 6 November 2026, France signed an agreement with Sweden and Cyprus for the joint procurement of Akeron including through the SAFE military credit program of the EU.

=== Future operators ===
Belgium
761 missiles ordered in 2022 to equip the Jaguar EBRC armored fighting vehicle, with deliveries to start in 2025.
Cyprus
On order for the Cypriot National Guard. To be mounted on the new Sherpa Light.
Luxembourg
90 missiles and unknown number of firing posts ordered in 2022, with deliveries to start before 2025.
Sweden
After a letter of intent was signed in July 2021, a few units of the Akeron MP missile system were ordered for testing and evaluation. A cooperation agreement was subsequently inked between Sweden and France in April 2023, which will see the Akeron MP selected as the "RBS 58" to replace the RBS 56 BILL 2 in Swedish service.
Firm orders:
- June 2025, first order.

=== Potential operators ===
Austria
Austria is purchasing 225 additional Pandur Evo 6×6, among which, an anti-tank variant is planned. In 2022, a variant of the Pandur offered by GDELS was shown with the MBDA IMPACT (Integrated Precision Attack Combat Turret) which is equipped with the Akeron MP and a 7.62 mm machine gun. As Austria is looking for a successor to the RBS-56 Bill 2, it is an option.
Greece
Memorandum of understanding signed in February 2024 between MBDA and the Greek companies Miltech and Altus to develop systems based on the Akeron MP missile. One of the projects aims at integrating the missile to Altus' Atlas 8 UAV. MBDA's ultimate goal is the adoption of the Akeron MP system by the Hellenic Army.
Portugal
The system is one of those considered by the Portuguese Army to replace the current MILAN systems.
Qatar
In December 2017, Qatar reportedly opened negotiations with MBDA to acquire the Akeron MP system for up to €400 million in order to replace around 650 missiles (mostly the HOT and its older MILAN missiles).
Spain
Spain cancelled its contract for the Spike LR2 missile, and is looking for a successor, among which are the Akeron MP and the Javelin.

== See also ==
- AT-1K Raybolt – (South Korea)
- FGM-148 Javelin – (United States)
- HJ-12 – (China)
- Spike LR & LR 2 – (Israel)
- Type 01 LMAT – (Japan)
