= MPATGM =

Indian anti-tank missile

Man portable anti-tank guided missile
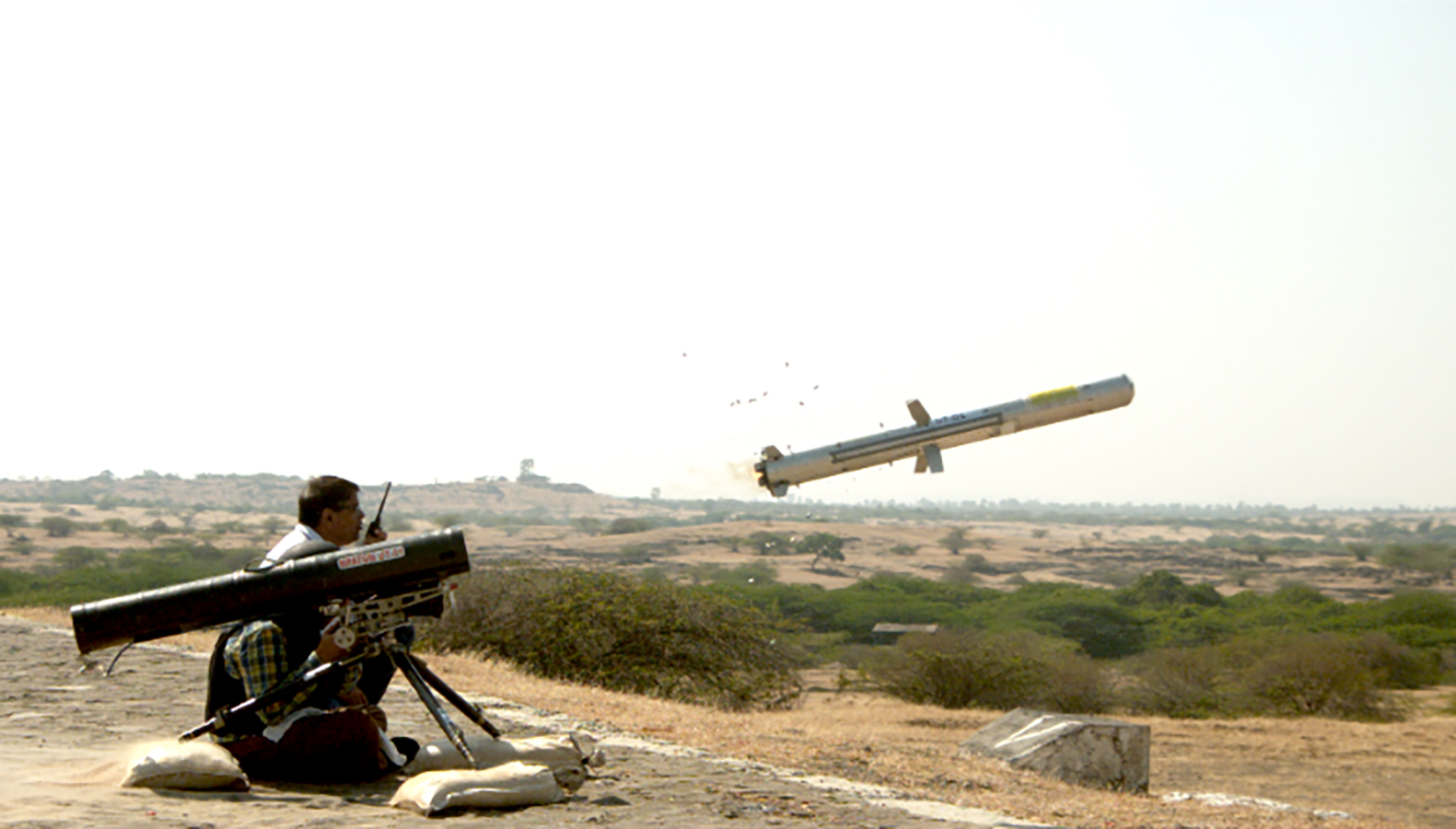
- MPATGM tested on 11 January 2026
- Type: Anti-tank guided missile
- Place of origin: India

Production history
- Designer: Defence Research and Development Organisation
- Designed: 2015
- Manufacturer: Bharat Dynamics Limited; Bharat Electronics Limited

Specifications
- Mass: Missile: 14.50 kg (32.0 lb); Command Launch Unit (CLU): 14.25 kg (31.4 lb)
- Length: 1,300 mm (4 ft 3 in)
- Diameter: 120 mm (4.7 in)
- Crew: 2
- Effective firing range: 200 m (0.20 km) - 4,000 m (4.0 km)
- Sights: Digital sight with laser designator
- Warhead: Tandem-charge HEAT
- Blast yield: Penetration: 660 mm of RHA + ERA; 710 mm of RHA
- Engine: Dual-thrust rocket with blast tube ejection motor
- Propellant: Solid fuel
- Guidance system: Dual mode mid-wave IIR direct drive with real-time target identification + Edge AI image processing
- Launch platform: Launch tube, tripod-mount

The MPATGM or man portable anti-tank guided missile, is an Indian third generation fire-and-forget anti-tank guided missile (ATGM) derived from India's Nag ATGM. It is being developed by the Defence Research and Development Organization (DRDO).

== Design ==
The MPATGM is a low weight, long cylindrical missile with two groups of four radial fins, larger ones at the middle, and smaller ones at the tail. It is fitted with one high-explosive anti-tank (HEAT) shaped charge warhead. The missile has a length of about 130 cm and a diameter of about 12 cm with a collapsible tripod, and launch tube of aluminum and carbon fiber to reduce weight. It has a weight of 14.5 kg, with its command launch unit (CLU) weighing 14.25 kg which combines a laser designator with digital all-weather sight. Minimum range is 200 to 300 m; maximum range is 4 km.

The MPATGM is equipped with an advanced dual-mode imaging infrared homing (IIR) sensor with integrated avionics for day and night operations. With both direct and top attack capabilities, the missile fires in lock-on before launch mode. It reportedly shares many similarities with ATGMs such as America's FGM-148 Javelin and Israel's Spike.

== Development ==
DRDO started work on a man-portable version of the Nag missile in 2015. The Ministry of Defence (MoD) sanctioned the official development of the MPATGM on 27 January 2015 with probable completion date around 26 July 2018 at a cost of ₹73.46 crore.

On 20 December 2017, India cancelled a major deal for acquiring the Israeli Spike (ATGM) in favour of the DRDO MPATGM, after deciding that no technology transfer was needed to develop the MPATGM. However, India reauthorized the deal in January 2018 during a visit of Israeli prime minister Benjamin Netanyahu to India. This deal was cancelled again in June 2019 after DRDO promised to deliver the MPATGM by 2021. However, the Indian Army bought a limited number of Spike (ATGM) to cater for their immediate needs until the MPATGM is ready for induction. MPATGM user trials were planned to be complete by 2020 but were postponed due to the COVID-19 pandemic. On induction, the MPATGM will replace second generation MILAN and 9M113 Konkurs ATGMs with the infantry, parachute, and special forces.

In collaboration with Bharat Dynamics, defense startup Tonbo Imaging is developing an uncooled lightweight infrared seeker that does not require a cryogenic compressor. The seeker has integrated real-time target identification and edge AI image processing to assist the missile in orienting itself toward the most vulnerable area of a target.

The Imaging Infrared (IIR) Homing Seeker, all-electric Control Actuation System, Fire Control System, tandem warhead, propulsion system and high performance sighting system were developed by different integral laboratories of DRDO including Research Centre Imarat (RCI), Terminal Ballistics Research Laboratory (TBRL), High Energy Materials Research Laboratory (HEMRL) and Instruments Research and Development Establishment (IRDE). Meanwhile, the Thermal Target System was developed by Defence Laboratory, Jodhpur which is being used to simulate the target tank to test the missile system.

The Defence Acquisition Council (DAC) of India's Defence Ministry cleared multiple procurement projects including that of MPATGM systems for the Indian Army on 3 July 2026.

=== Production facility ===
The MPATGM will be manufactured by Bharat Dynamics at a facility located in Bhanoor, Telangana. This facility was inaugurated on 29 September 2018. Another Development cum Production Partner is Bharat Electronics.

== Testing ==
- Test 1 – On 15 September 2018, DRDO conducted the first trial of the MPATGM; it was successful. On 16 September 2018, this was followed by another successful trial.
- Test 2 – On 13 March 2019, DRDO successfully completed guided flight trials (GFTs) of the MPATGM at Rajasthan desert. It proved the top attack mode, at a range of 2,500 m. On 14 March 2019, another successful test occurred.
- Test 3 – On 11 September 2019, the missile was tested again. A man portable tripod launcher was used in the test. The target of the test was a dummy tank, which was hit via top-attack.
- Test 4 – After a gap of one year due to COVID-19 lockdown in India, on 21 July 2021, DRDO successfully flight tested the MPATGM on a target mimicking a tank, using a thermal sight to prove the minimum range using direct attack at 200–300 meters. The test was to validate missile in-flight stability and deployment of guidance mechanism within short distance. With this test, the MPATGM development project is now nearer completion. During this test, the missile used a newly developed light-weight state of the art miniaturized version of the IIR seeker.
- Test 5 – On 11 January 2022, DRDO successfully flight tested MPATGM in final deliverable configuration. The test was to prove consistent performance at minimum range. It already completed a similar successful test for maximum range. The missile used a miniaturized IIR seeker with advanced avionics for on-board control and guidance. The system is now ready to enter serial production. In this test, the Indian Army's demand that the missile be effective and accurate at 200–300 m, was demonstrated for the second time. This matched the minimum range performance of ATGMs such as Spike-LR with effective minimum range of 200 m.
- Test 6 – In 2023, flights trials of MPATGM were conducted for a range of 2.5 km at National Open Air Range (NOAR), Kurnool.
- Test 7 – At the Pokhran Test Range, DRDO successfully completed a number of field evaluation tests on 13 April 2024. The MPATGM missile, the launcher unit, the target acquisition system, and the fire control unit were all part of the test system. Trials for both tandem warhead penetration and warhead flight were conducted in the presence of a user team. This test will now lead to 'Final User Evaluation Trials' and eventual induction into the Indian Army.
- Test 8 – The warhead flight trials have been successfully conducted on 13 August 2024 at Pokhran Field Firing Range. The joint Indian Army-DRDO team assessed the performance using a range of flight configurations and operating factors. The efficiency in defeating contemporary armor-protection has been demonstrated by successful penetration trials of tandem warhead system.
- Test 9 – The missile was tested successfully against a moving target on 11 January 2026 at the KK Ranges, Ahilya Nagar, Maharashtra. The target tank was the Thermal Target System developed by Defence Laboratory, Jodhpur.

== Gallery ==
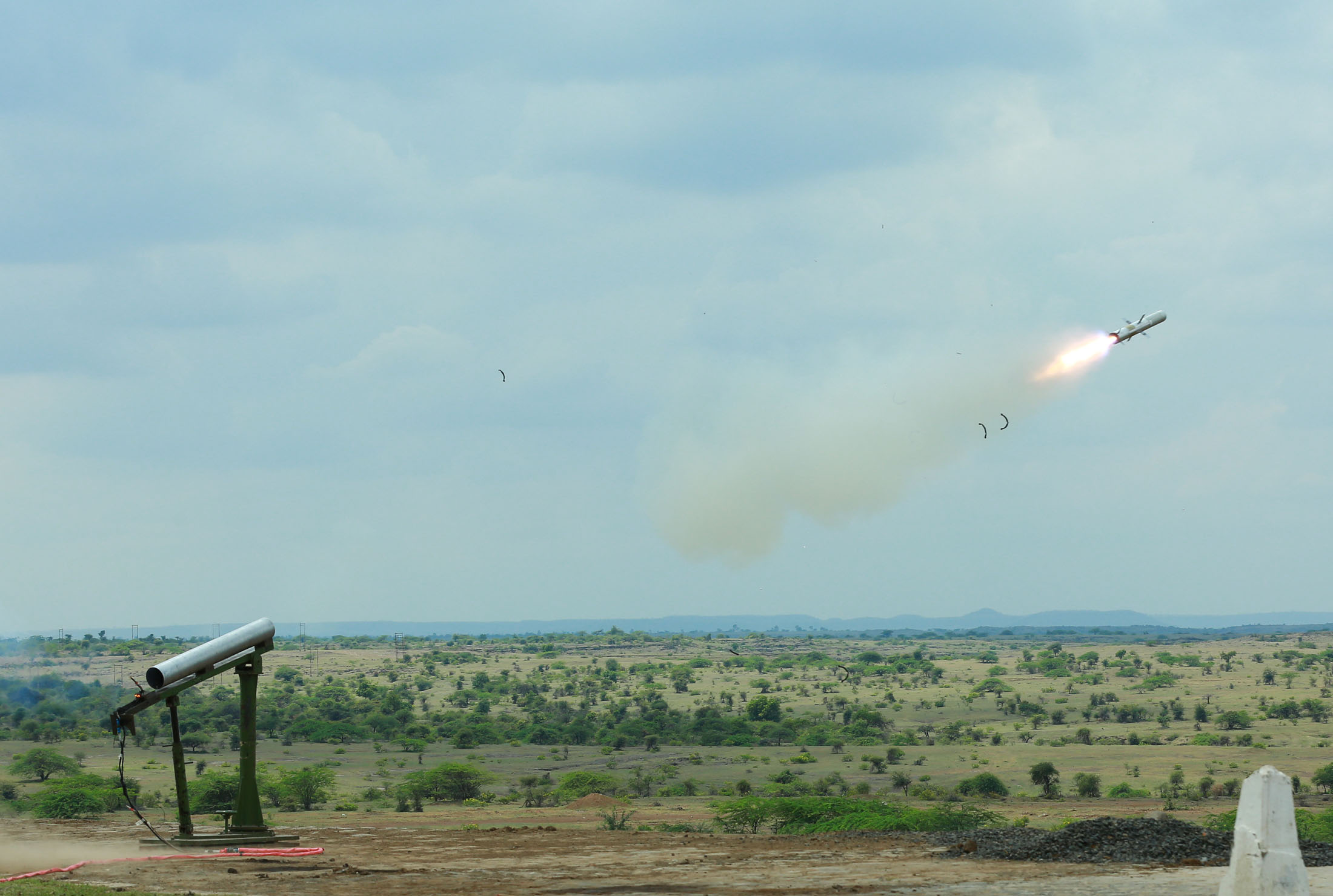
Maiden test flight.

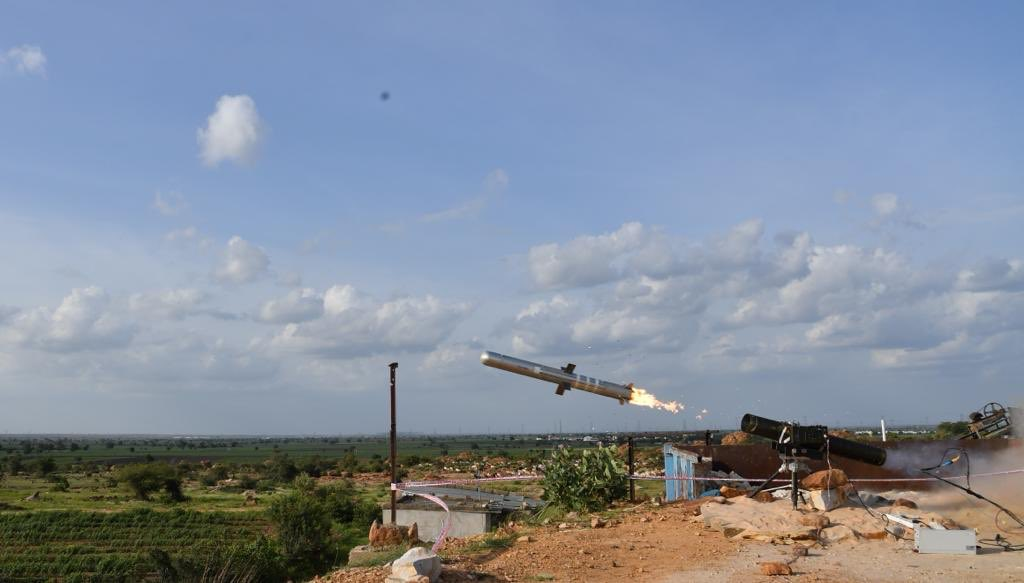
Top-attack ability and tripod launcher validation test.

Final deliverable configuration test.

Calibration test for target at minimum range.

== See also ==
Related development

- Nag (missile)

Missiles of comparable role and configuration

- Spike-LR – (Israel)
- FGM-148 Javelin – (United States)
- HJ-12 – (China)
- AT-1K Raybolt – (South Korea)
- ALAS – (Serbia)
- Karaok – (Turkey)
