= Bhanoor =

Village in Telangana, India

Bhanoor is a village near Patancheru (8 km) in the Indian state of Telangana.

In 2018 it was another that India's MPATGM missile would be manufactured in the village.
