= Hard launch =

Hard launching is when a guided missile's rocket engine is ignited while still inside the launch assembly (sometimes referred to as missile canister), silo, or tube. Although technically simpler than soft launching, its disadvantage is that the missile silo has to be more resilient to damage.

The Soviets pioneered soft launches as a low-cost method. Soft launching has to overcome the difficulty of first expelling the projectile from the silo passively (without engine ignition). Only after the missile completely clears the silo can the engine be ignited.

Usually, soft launching requires two independent systems: one to expel the missile, and the second to ignite it after adequately clearing the silo. Hard launching is, therefore, more straightforward but more expensive. There is also a higher degree of risk associated with hard launches. If there is a malfunction, the missile can detonate inside the silo, severely damaging neighboring components and auxiliary systems of the launch base.

Most of the United States ICBMs and SLBMs are cold launched. The MK-41 on American Ships launch SM-2, SM-3 and SM-6 hot. The US Navy has been adopting more versatile launch systems that can work in either modes.

== See also ==
- Soft launch (missile)
- Hot launch and cold launch
