= HJ-12 =

Chinese-made portable fire-and-forget anti-tank missile

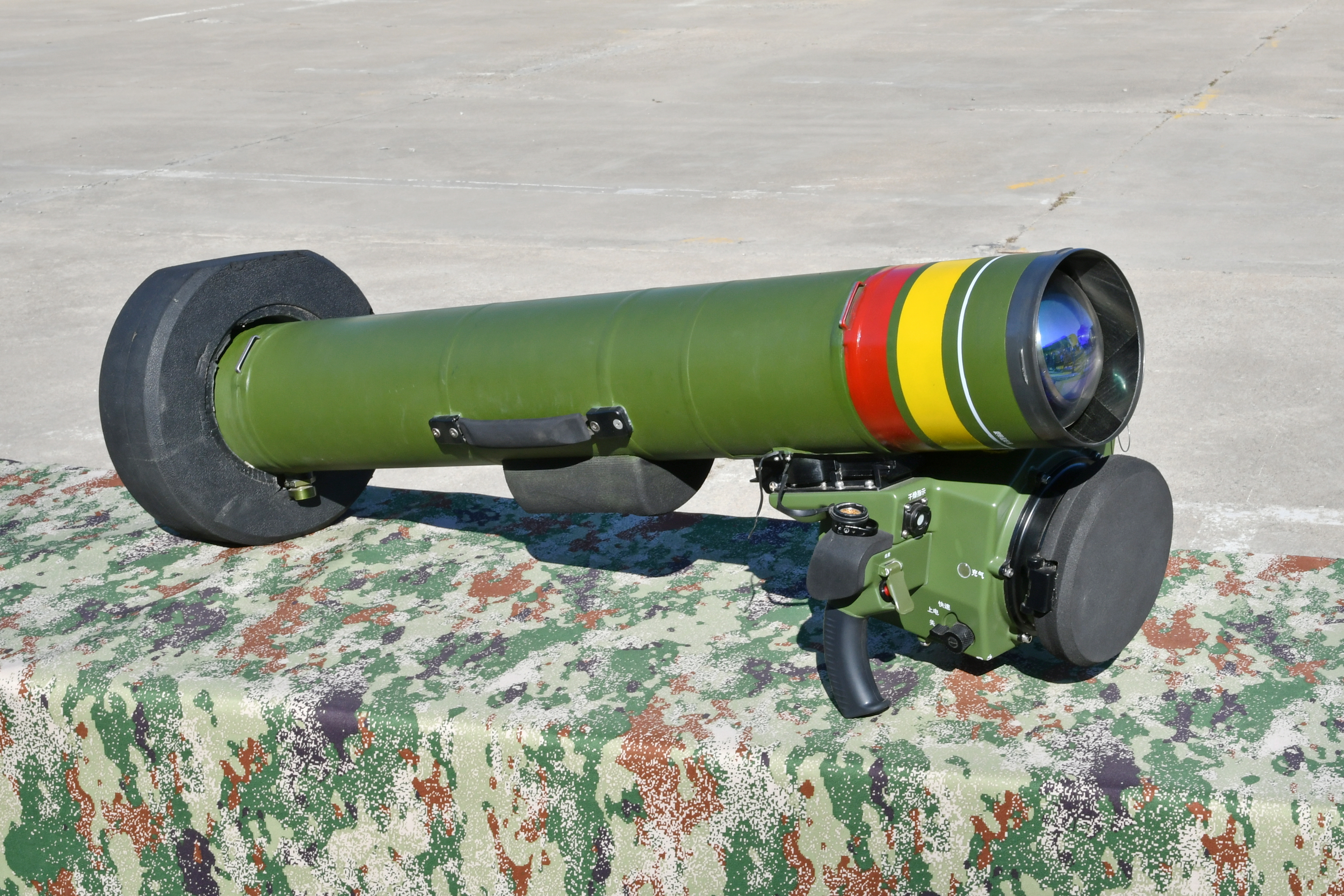
- HJ-12 launcher and missile
- Type: Top attack Anti-tank missile Surface-to-surface missile Surface-to-air missile
- Place of origin: China

Service history
- In service: 2020–present
- Used by: See § Users

Production history
- Manufacturer: Norinco
- Produced: 2014–present

Specifications
- Mass: 22 kg (49 lb) (carry weight); 17 kg (37 lb) (missile); 5 kg (11 lb) (IIR/EO targeting sight)
- Length: Missile: 0.98 m (3.2 ft); Launch tube: 1.2 m (3.9 ft)
- Diameter: Missile: 13.5 cm (5.3 in); Launch tube: 17 cm (6.7 in)
- Effective firing range: 4,000 m (2.5 mi) (daytime); 2,000 m (1.2 mi) (nighttime)
- Warhead: Tandem shaped charge HEAT
- Detonation mechanism: Impact force
- Engine: Solid fuel rocket
- Guidance system: Infrared homing, TV imaging

The Hongjian-12 (Chinese: 红箭-12; pinyin: Hóng Jiàn-12; lit. 'Red Arrow-12') is a third generation, man-portable, fire-and-forget infrared homing top-attack anti-tank missile of China. It was unveiled at the Eurosatory 2014 exhibition.

== History ==
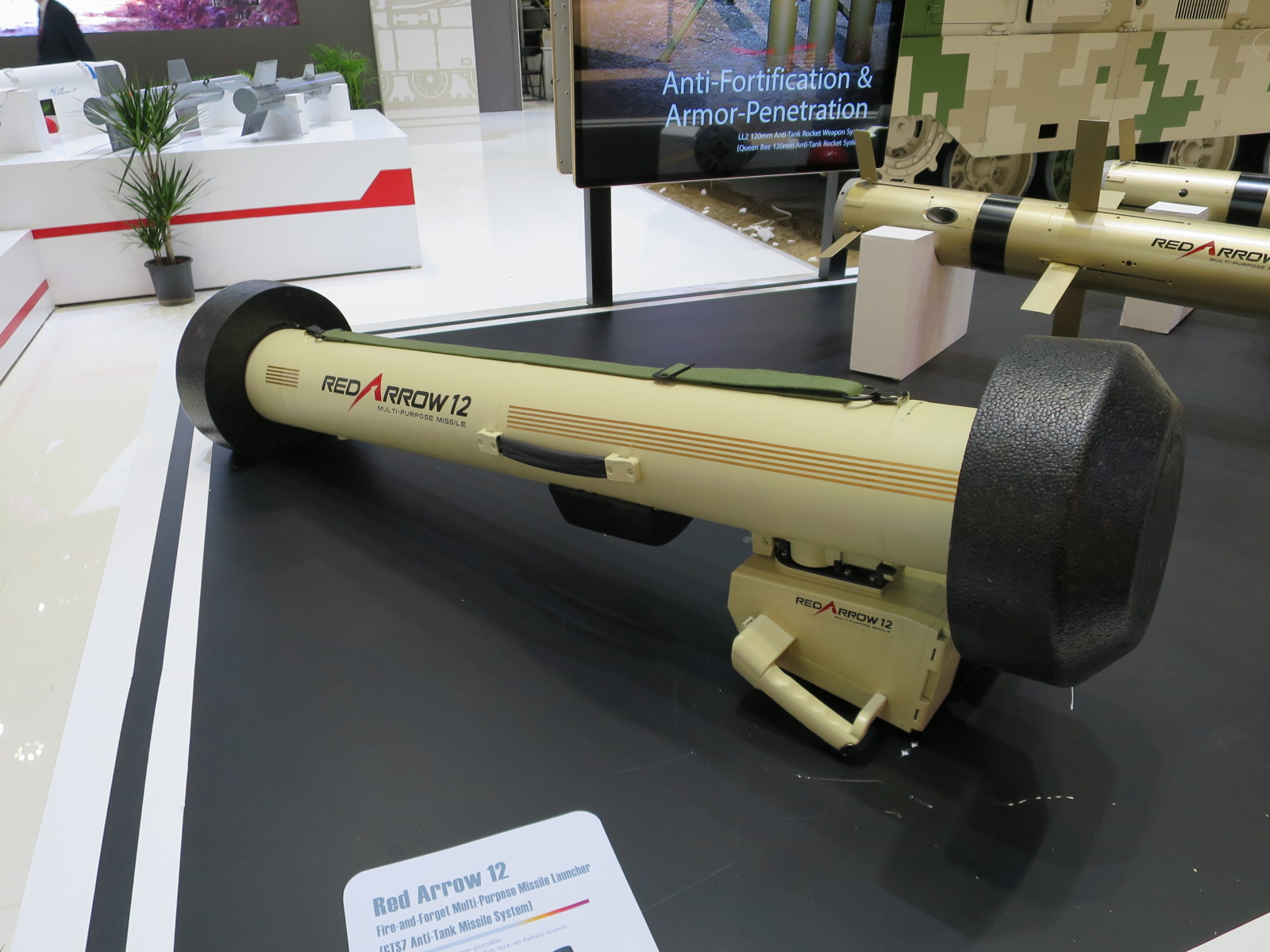
Red Arrow-12 mockup at IDEX 2017

The missile was first showcased on the Eurosatory 2014 exhibition. Subsequent modifications and improvements were showcased in the following exhibitions. At Airshow China 2016, China North Industries Corporation (Norinco) unveiled HJ-12E, the export variant with new control fins and rocket motors.

On 25 March 2020, Norinco announced its first successful export order to Algeria.

In July 2021, the HJ-12 was incorporated into People's Liberation Army Ground Force service. The PLA service version is likely based on the latest HJ-12E variant.

== Design ==
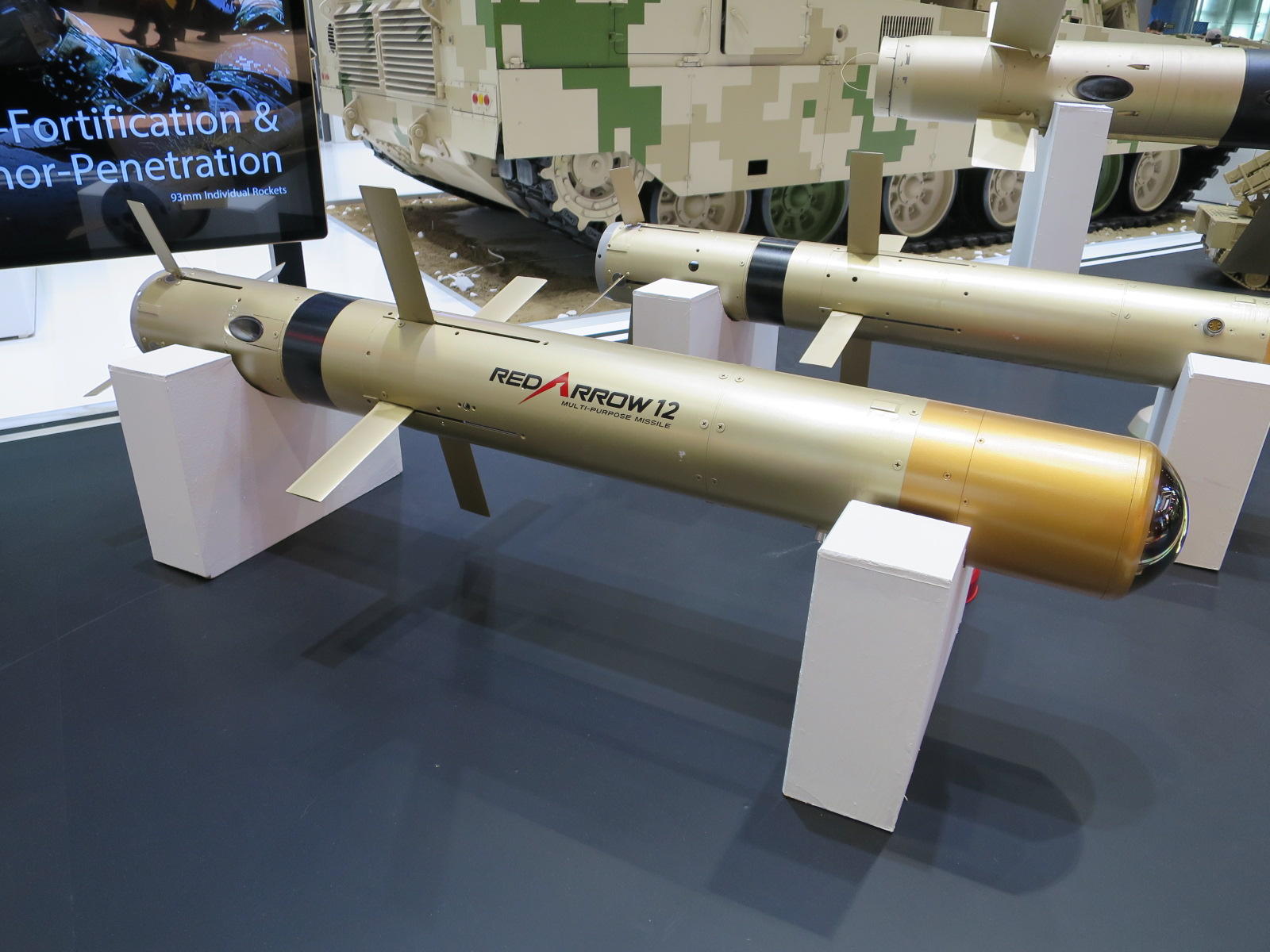
HJ-12 (Red Arrow-12) missile mock-up showcased at IDEX 2017

The HJ-12 is a modern, third generation anti-tank missile developed by Norinco. The HJ-12 is a fire-and-forget system utilising lock-on before launch (LOBL) and is capable of being fired within buildings and bunkers due to its soft launch system. Once launched, it will home autonomously onto its target, allowing the operator to immediately take cover or reload to engage another target. Its fire-and-forget technology will reduce the number of anti-tank operators needed on a battlefield. The missile is capable of day/night all-weather operation with its infrared homing, TV imaging dual-mode seeker. The warhead uses a tandem shaped charge design with an estimated penetration capability of up to 1,100 mm (43 in) of rolled homogeneous armour (RHA) after penetrating explosive reactive armour. The guided missile is capable of engaging armoured vehicles, fortifications, helicopters and boats. When facing non-armoured point targets, bunkers and fortifications, the missile can be fitted with either high-explosive or thermal effect warheads. When engaging enemy tanks and armoured vehicles, the HJ-12 aims to destroy the top of its targets, the more vulnerable point.

The HJ-12 is China's first portable anti-tank missile, increasing the ability of the People's Liberation Army Ground Force to have more modern and mobile infantry forces. It is intended to enable China to match up with anti-tank missile developments made by Western defence companies, like the FGM-148 Javelin and Spike. The missile is also available for export to armies in developing countries that would need to contend with third-generation main battle tanks, but the number of potential buyers is likely small due to its higher cost.

== Variants ==
HJ-12
Base variant, first unveiled in Airshow China 2014.
HJ-12E
Export designation for HJ-12

== Users ==
- Algeria
  - Algerian People's National Army
- China
  - People's Liberation Army Ground Force
- Indonesia
  - PT Pindad and Norinco signed a Memorandum of Understanding (MoU) regarding the Development of Anti-tank Guided Missile Technology on November 7, 2022
- Kyrgyzstan
  - State Border Guard Service of Kyrgyzstan
- Nigeria
  - Nigerian Armed Forces

== See also ==
Red Arrow development

- HJ-8 – wire-guided anti-tank missile system
- HJ-9 – laser command guidance anti-tank missile system
- HJ-10 – fiber-optic wire-guided anti-tank missile system

Comparable systems

- Akeron MP – (France)
- AT-1K Raybolt – (South Korea)
- FGM-148 Javelin – (United States)
- GAM-100 – (China)
- NLAW – (Sweden, United Kingdom)
- OMTAS – (Turkey)
- Spike – (Israel)
- Type 01 LMAT – (Japan)
- Almas (missile) – (Iran)

Related lists

- List of anti-tank missiles
- List of missiles
