= Soft launch (missile) =

Method of launching a missile

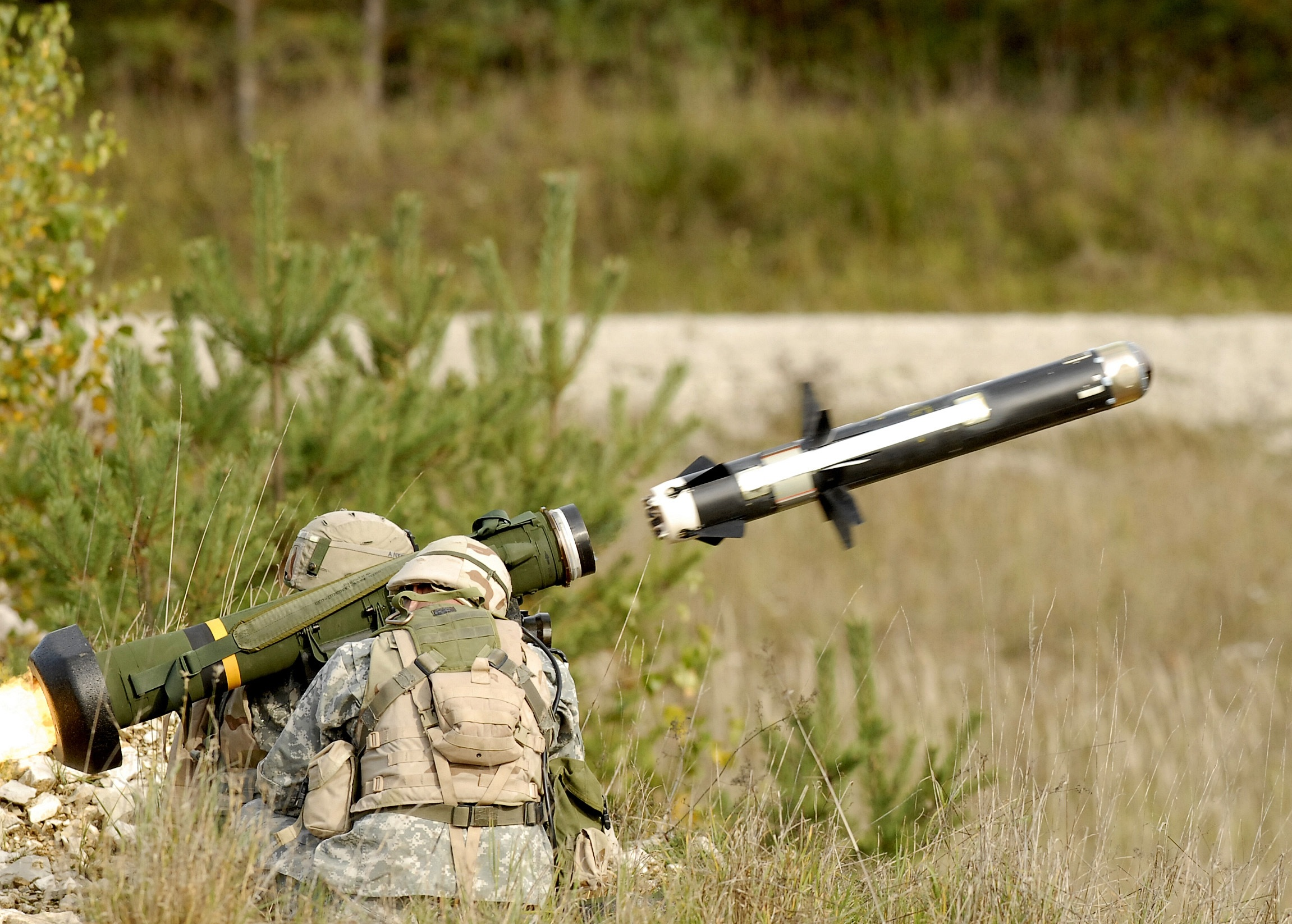
A soft launch using an FGM-148 Javelin anti-tank missile. While the ejection charge inside of the missile silo has been ignited, the main engine of the missile has not yet been ignited.

Soft launching is the method of launching a missile (such as an anti-tank guided missile) in such a way that the rocket motor ignites outside of the launch tube; the missile is ejected non-explosively. The objective is to minimize the risk of damage to the launcher by maintaining a safe distance. This is in contrast with hard launching, where the missile's rocket engine is ignited while still inside the launch assembly or tube, which generates a backblast area.

A similar concept called cold launch was pioneered by the Soviet Union for application in vertical launch system clusters on board ships.

== Examples ==
Man-portable anti-tank guided missiles that soft launch include:

- FGM-148 Javelin
- Spike
- HJ-12
- NLAW
- MPATGM
