= Tandem-charge =

Explosive device or projectile that has two or more stages of detonation

A tandem-charge or dual-charge weapon is an explosive device or projectile that has two or more stages of detonation, assisting it to penetrate either reactive armour on an armoured vehicle or strong structures.

== Anti-tank ==
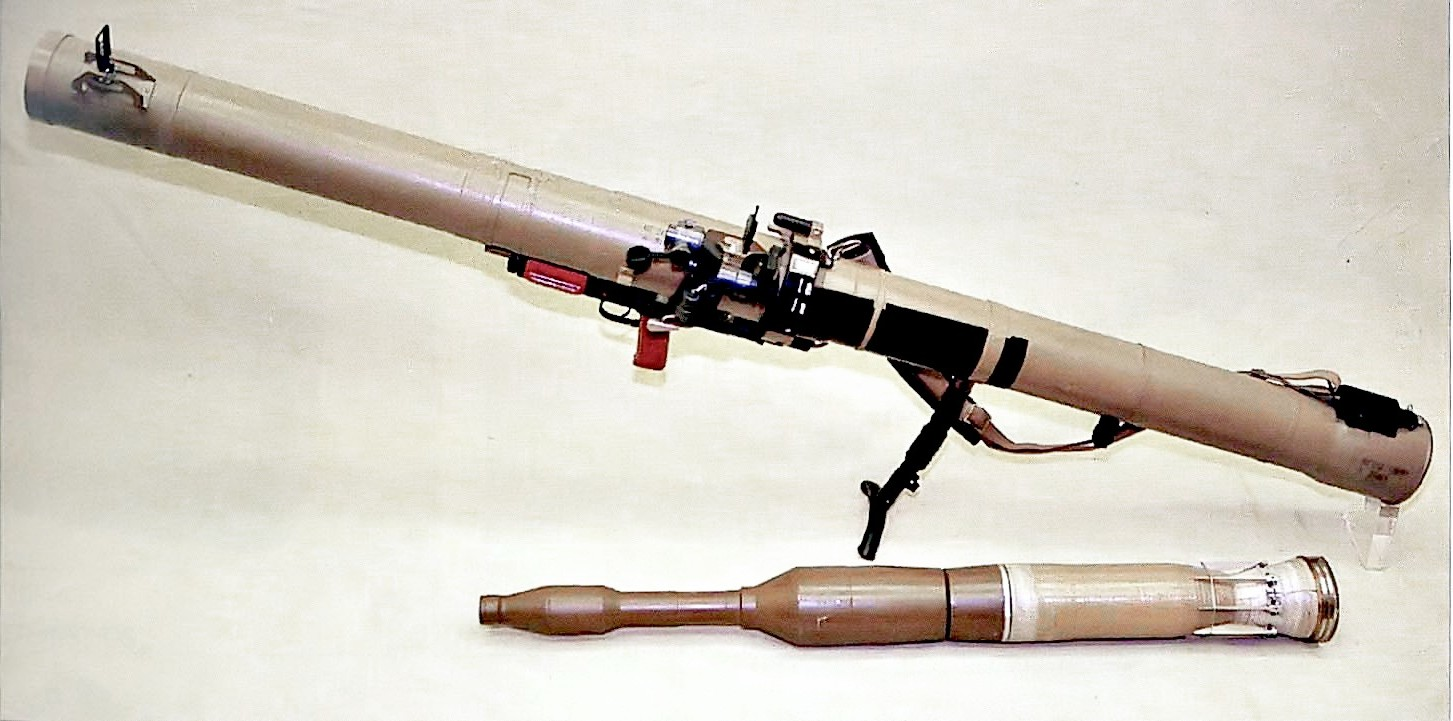
An RPG-29 and its PG-29V rocket with a tandem-charge warhead

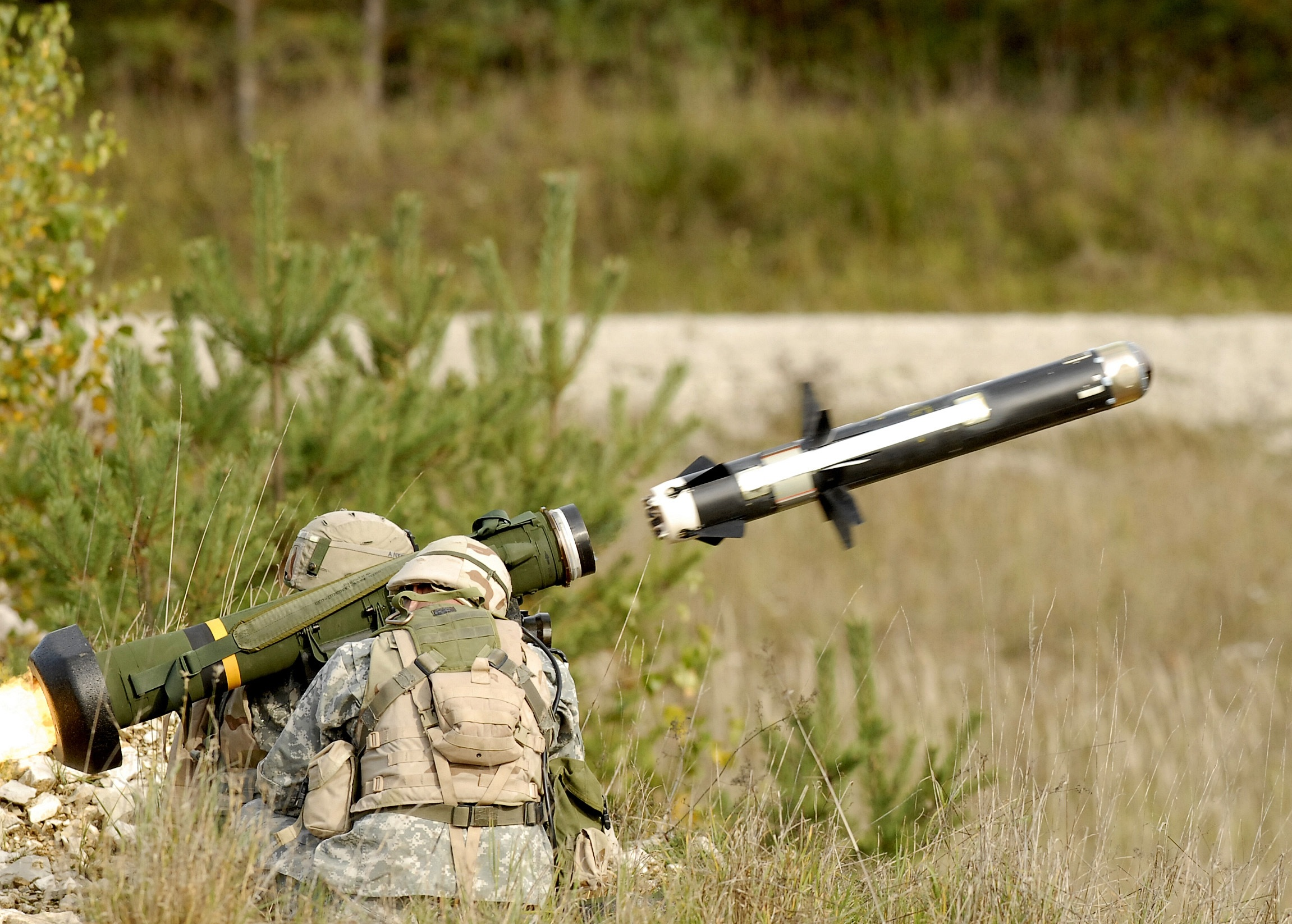
The self-guided FGM-148 Javelin missile has a tandem-charge warhead.

Tandem charges are effective against reactive armour, which is designed to protect an armoured vehicle (mostly tanks) against anti-tank munitions. The first stage of the weapon is typically a weak charge that either pierces the reactive armour of the target without detonating it, leaving a channel through the reactive armour so that the second warhead may pass unimpeded, or simply detonates the armour, causing the timing of the counter-explosion to fail. The second detonation from the same projectile (which defines it as a tandem charge) attacks the same location as the first detonation where the reactive armour has been compromised. Since the regular armour plating is often the only defence remaining, the main charge (second detonation) has an increased likelihood of penetrating the armour. An example of a tandem charge warhead is used by the 9M133 Kornet-M missile system.

However, while tandem charges are more useful against explosive reactive armour, they are less effective against the non-explosive reactive armor, since their inner liner is not explosive itself and thus not expended by the small forward warhead of tandem-charge attack.

The PG-7VR warhead for the RPG-7 rocket launcher and the PG-29V warhead for the more modern RPG-29 rocket launcher are examples of tandem charges, but the technology is employed worldwide. Examples of missiles that use tandem charges include the BGM-71 TOW, FGM-148 Javelin and the Brimstone.

The RMG is a derivative of the RPG-26 that uses a tandem-charge warhead, with the precursor high-explosive anti-tank (HEAT) warhead blasting an opening for the main thermobaric charge to enter and detonate inside. The RMG's precursor HEAT warhead can penetrate 300 millimetres (12 in) of reinforced concrete or more than 100 millimetres (3.9 in) of rolled homogeneous armour, thus allowing the 105 mm (4.1 in)-diameter thermobaric warhead to detonate inside.

== Penetration charges ==
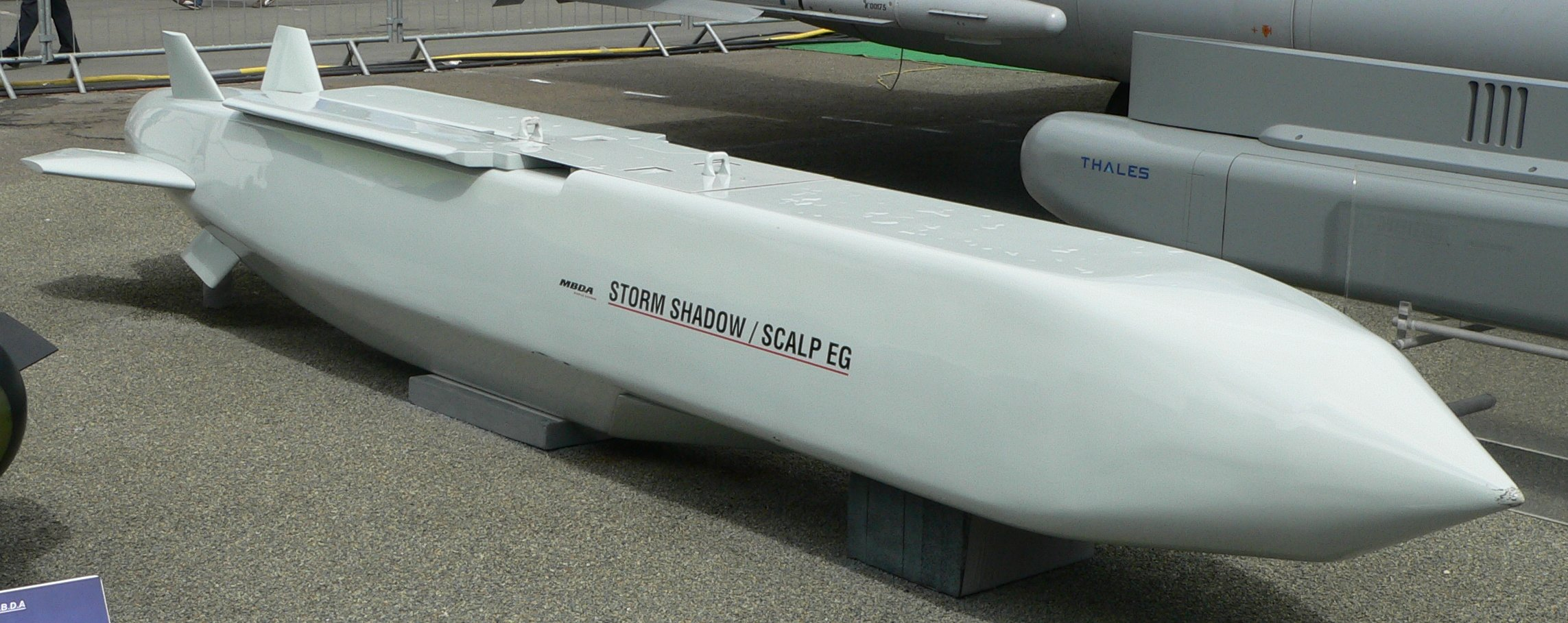
The Storm Shadow missile uses a tandem-charge warhead to penetrate hardened structures.

Dual charges increase the effectiveness of warheads when used against structures (such as bunkers). Because the explosion of a unitary high explosive charge will follow the path of least resistance, much of the explosive power of a warhead will be lost to the air surrounding the target if detonated outside the structure. This effect can be countered by using heavily constructed gravity bombs with delay fuzes that penetrate the earth, concrete, etc. of the target before exploding—thus containing the explosion inside the structure and significantly increasing its effect.

Gravity bombs require aircraft to fly rather close to what may be a heavily defended target, which poses a significant risk to the launch aircraft. Cruise missiles equipped with large tandem-charge warheads can use the first charge to create a hole into which the missile flies before exploding the second charge, creating a similar effect of the delayed gravity bomb. An example of an anti-structure tandem-charge warhead is the BROACH warhead.

== See also ==
- High-explosive anti-tank
- Shaped charge
