= Komatsu LAV =

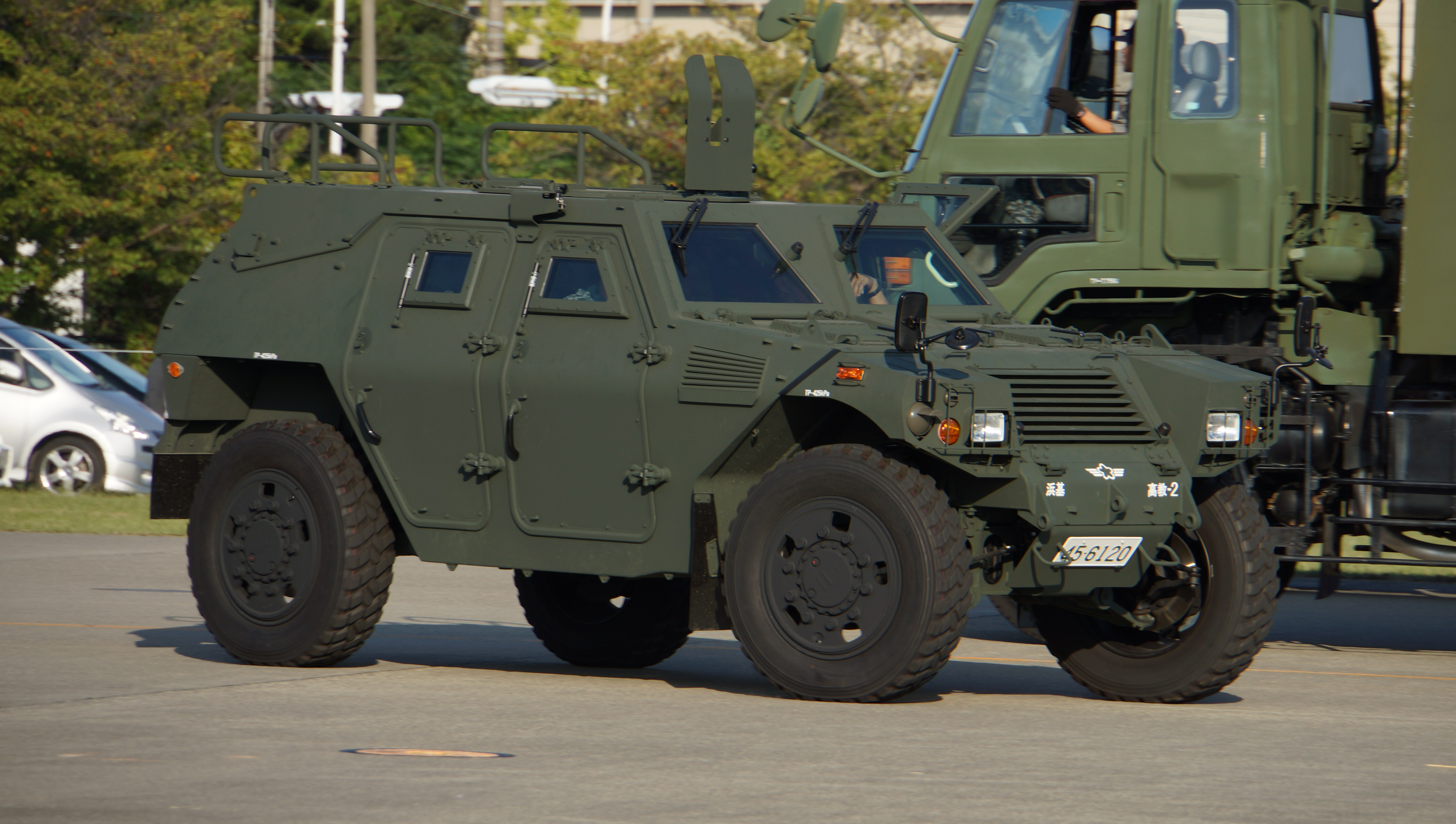
- A Komatsu LAV parked at JASDF's Hamamatsu Air Base in central Japan. The roof-top shield has a provision for a machine gun.
- Type: Armoured scout car
- Place of origin: Japan

Service history
- In service: 2002–present
- Used by: Japan
- Wars: Iraq War

Production history
- Designed: 1997
- Manufacturer: Komatsu
- Unit cost: ¥30 million
- Produced: 1997-2017
- No. built: 1937 (2016)

Specifications
- Mass: 4500 kg
- Length: 4.4 m
- Width: 2.04 m
- Height: 1.85 m
- Crew: 4+1 (MG or ATGM gunner)
- Main armament: Sumitomo M249 or Sumitomo M2HB
- Secondary armament: Type 01 LMAT or a Kawasaki Type 87 anti-tank missile.
- Engine: 4-cylinder diesel 160 hp
- Drive: 4x4 wheeled
- Transmission: 4 speed Automatic
- Operational range: 500 km
- Maximum speed: 100 km/h (Speeds can exceed 70mph)

The Komatsu light armored vehicle (Japanese: 軽装甲機動車; (kei-sōkō-kidōsha) is a Japanese military vehicle first produced in 2002. Currently used exclusively by the Japan Self-Defense Force (JSDF), it has seen use in the Iraq War. It is built by Komatsu Limited. Defense Systems Division in Komatsu, Ishikawa, Japan. Komatsu's factory designation for the vehicle is KU50W.

The exterior resembles the Panhard VBL used by the French army, but the LAV has 4 doors and a large cabin for carrying soldiers. The LAV can also be transported by air in vehicles like the CH-47J and the C-130H.

== History ==
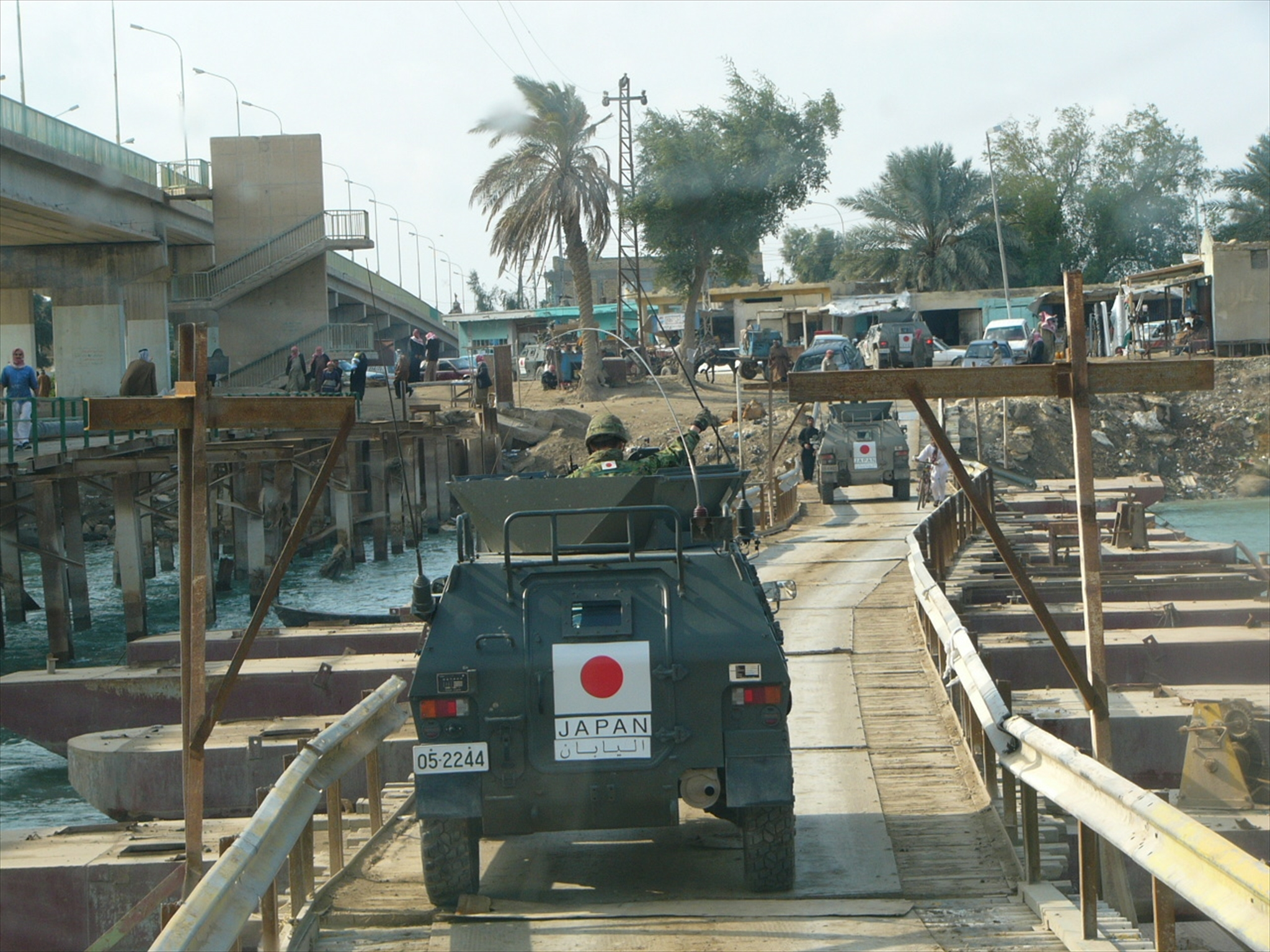
A Komatsu LAV with Japanese Iraq Reconstruction and Support Group markings in Samawa.

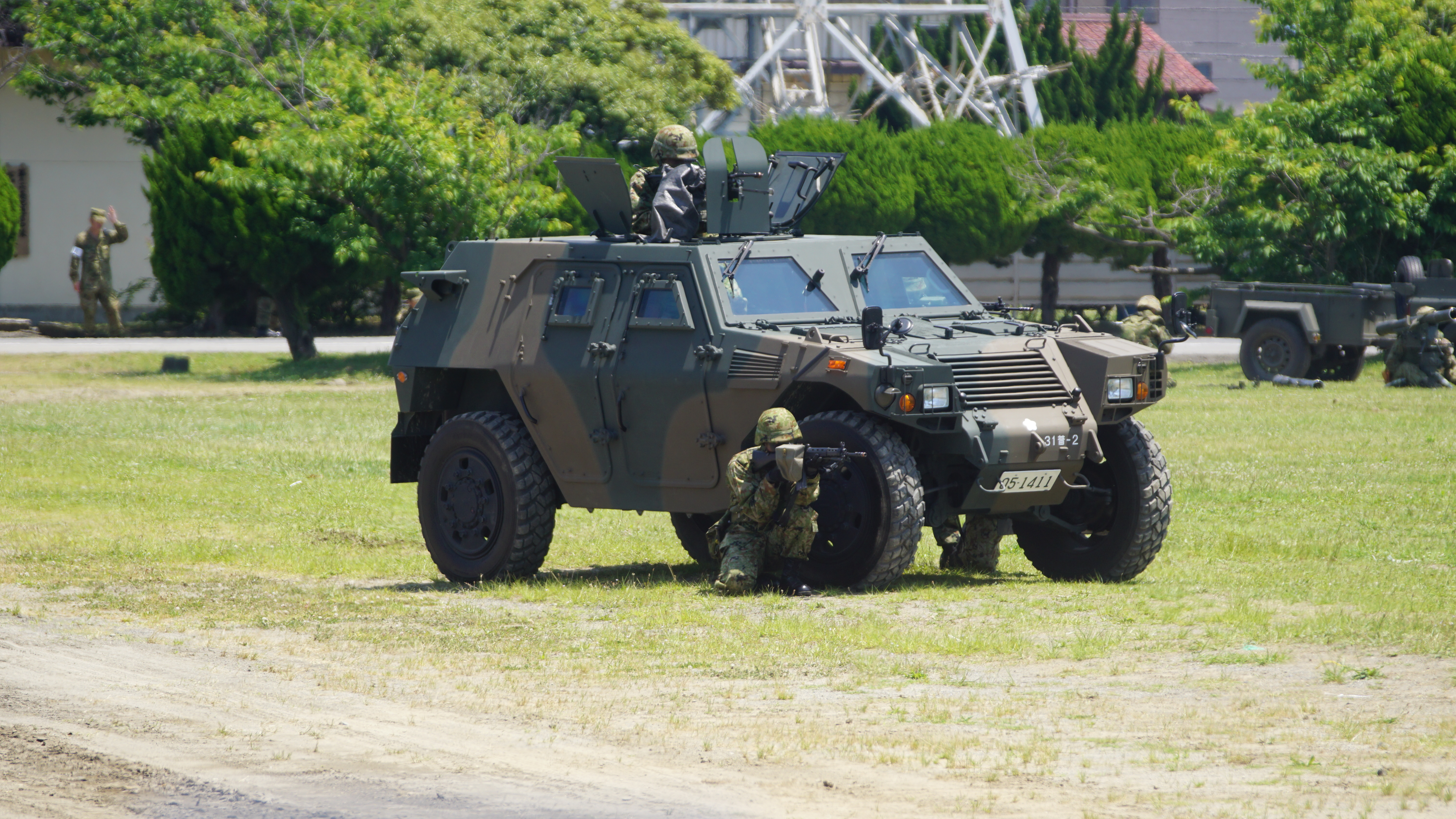
Komatsu LAV during demonstration in Yokosuka 2017

The Komatsu LAV was developed in 1997 to meet a JGSDF need for an armored wheeled vehicle that could provide armored protection since their Toyota High Mobility Vehicles and Mitsubishi Type 73 light trucks were not adequate to provide protection from small arms fire. They were initially created with the concept of a potential Soviet invasion during the Cold War before they were relegated to anti-terrorist/invasion operations.

It had made its first appearance in Kuwait when JGSDF units had deployed the Komatsu LAV prior to humanitarian operations in Samawah, a city in Iraq, 280 km (174 mi) southeast of Baghdad. An initial 400 LAVs were brought into JGSDF service in March 2005. JASDF base security units are also equipped with the LAV as a main vehicle for patrols.

In February 2019, Komatsu formally announced it will no longer develop new models of the LAV, citing high cost in developing a new model and low profit return when production was first halted in 2017. They would only continue production for NBC recon vehicles.

== Variants ==
No variants are known to be available, but the vehicle appears to have been built in at least three production models, namely KU50W-0002K, KU50W-0003K and KU50W-0005K.

== Design ==
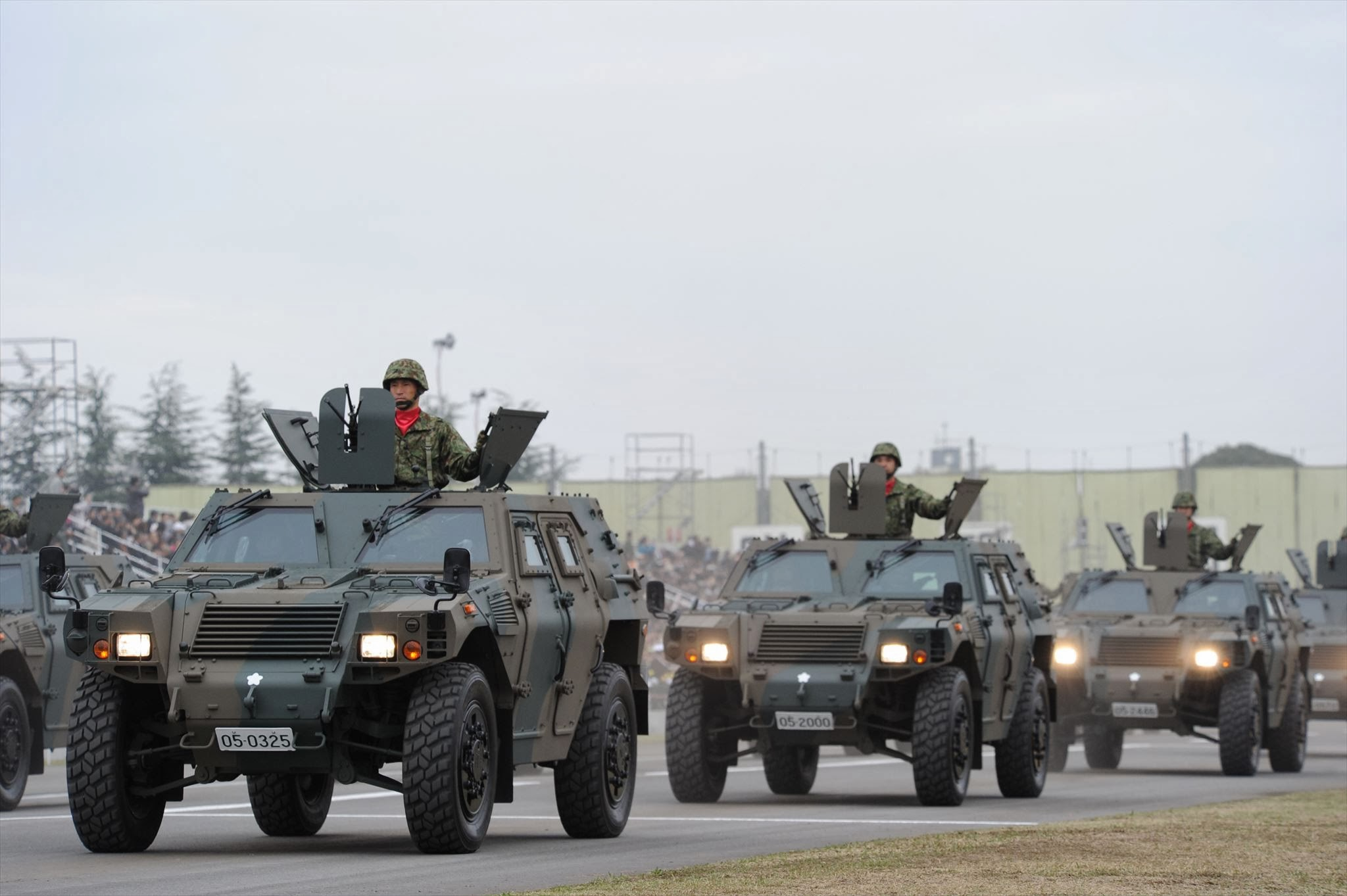
Komatsu LAVs used by the JGSDF in a military parade. Note the split-type roof hatches and the machine gun shield.

The Komatsu LAV has open-split roof hatch of the vehicle provides additional protection to the gunner from all directions, if it is locked in an upright position. The vehicles deployed in Iraq are fitted with reinforced bulletproof windshields, wire cutters and an armoured tub around the gun mount for extra protection.

According to reports, the vehicle is bulletproof against 5.56 and 7.62 bullets. It is unknown whether other bullet calibers can easily penetrate the LAV or not.

For the LAV's engine, it is fitted with a liquid cooled 4-cycle diesel engine of 160 hp. The power pack is mounted centre forward of the vehicle to distribute weight more evenly between the axles. The propulsion system provides a top speed of 100 km/h, traveling more than 200 miles without refueling. It is fitted with all run-flat tires. The low turning radius allows the vehicle to negotiate narrow passages.

The Komatsu LAV can be armed with the Sumitomo M249 LMG or Sumitomo M2HB 12.7mm machine gun for anti-personnel duties. It can also mount the Type 01 LMAT or a Kawasaki Type 87 anti-tank missile for anti-armored missions. Smoke grenade dischargers can be mounted on the rear sides of the vehicle.

== Operators ==
- Japan

== See also ==
- Otokar Cobra of Turkey
- Véhicule Blindé Léger of France

== Sources ==
=== References ===
- Kenkyusha's New Japanese-English Dictionary, Kenkyusha Limited, Tokyo 1991, ISBN 4-7674-2015-6
