= Type 64 MAT =

Japanese MCLOS wire-guided anti-tank missile

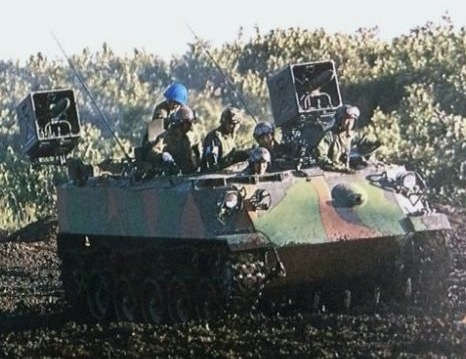
- Type 60 APC with two Type 64 MAT
- Type: MCLOS wire-guided Anti-tank missile
- Place of origin: Japan

Service history
- In service: 1964 - 2008
- Used by: Japan

Production history
- Designer: Defense Agency Technical Research and Development Institute
- Designed: 1957
- Manufacturer: Kawasaki Heavy Industries
- Produced: 1964
- No. built: 220

Specifications
- Mass: 15.7 kg
- Length: 1.02 m
- Diameter: 0.12 m
- Crew: 3
- Effective firing range: 350 to 1,800 m
- Warhead: Hollow charge
- Engine: Two-stage solid rocket motor - first stage rated at 130 kg static thrust, second stage rated at 15 kg static thrust.
- Maximum speed: 306 km/h
- Guidance system: MCLOS system

The Type 64 MAT (Note: MAT is defined as Missile, Anti Tank) (64式対戦車誘導弾, Roku yon-shiki tai-sensha yūdō-dan; Type 64 anti-tank guided missile) is a Japanese wire-guided anti-tank missile developed during the late 1950s. Within the JGSDF, it is also known as 64MAT and KAM-3.

== History ==
Development of the missile began in 1957, and was adopted as standard equipment for the Japanese Ground Self-Defense Forces with the official designation Type 64 ATM (Note: ATM is defined as Anti Tank Missile) in 1964. Kawasaki Heavy Industries had been responsible for manufacturing the Type 64.

Production of the missile ended in 1980.

Though the Type 64 MAT had been largely phased out and replaced by the Type 79 Jyu-MAT and Type 87 Chu-MAT as front-line anti-tank missiles in the 1970s to the 1990s, a small number are being held as reserve missiles. The Type 54 MATs were officially retired by 2008.

== Description ==
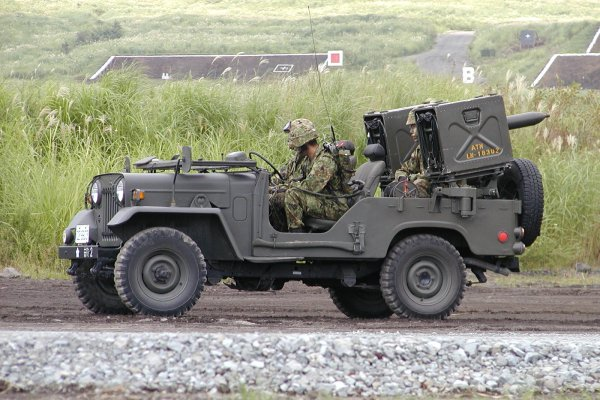
Mitsubishi Type 73 jeep with two Type 64 anti-tank missile pods.

The missile is cruciform in cross-section with four large wings. It is powered by a dual thrust rocket motor, which accelerates the missile to its cruising speed in 0.8 seconds.

=== Operational use ===
The missile is launched from an open framed launcher at an angle of 15 degrees. The operator steers the missile using a control box, which sends commands down a wire that is trailed from the missile. A gyroscope in the missile compensates for pitch and yaw. When fired, the Type 64 produces black smoke, which allows enemy forces to locate the anti-tank missile team.

The Type 64 is typically operated by a three-man crew. It can also be deployed from a Mitsubishi Type 73 jeep, which can carry four missiles and a Type 60 armoured personnel carrier.

== Similar missile systems ==
- 9M14 Malyutka – (Soviet Union)
- Cobra – (West Germany)

== See also ==
- Type 79 Jyu-MAT – (Japan)
- Type 87 Chu-MAT – (Japan)
- Type 01 LMAT – (Japan)
