= Type 87 Chu-MAT =

Japanese laser-guided anti-tank missile

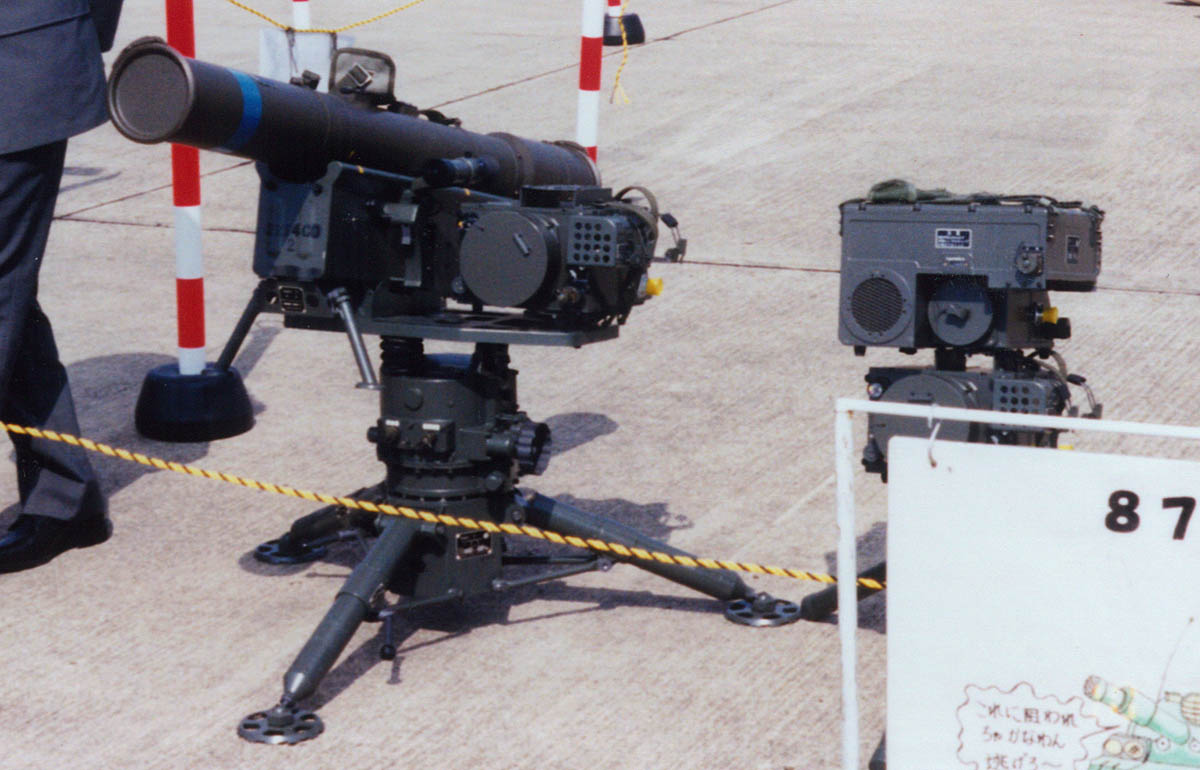
- The Type 87 launcher and laser designator on a single tripod.
- Type: Laser guided anti-tank missile
- Place of origin: Japan

Service history
- In service: 1989 - present
- Used by: Japan

Production history
- Designer: Defense Agency Technical Research and Development Institute
- Designed: Late 1970s
- Manufacturer: Kawasaki Heavy Industries; Mitsubishi Motors
- Produced: 1987 to present

Specifications
- Mass: Missile 12 kg System 140 kg
- Length: 1 m
- Crew: 3
- Caliber: 110 mm
- Effective firing range: 2,000 m
- Sights: Laser assisted sights
- Guidance system: Laser guidance

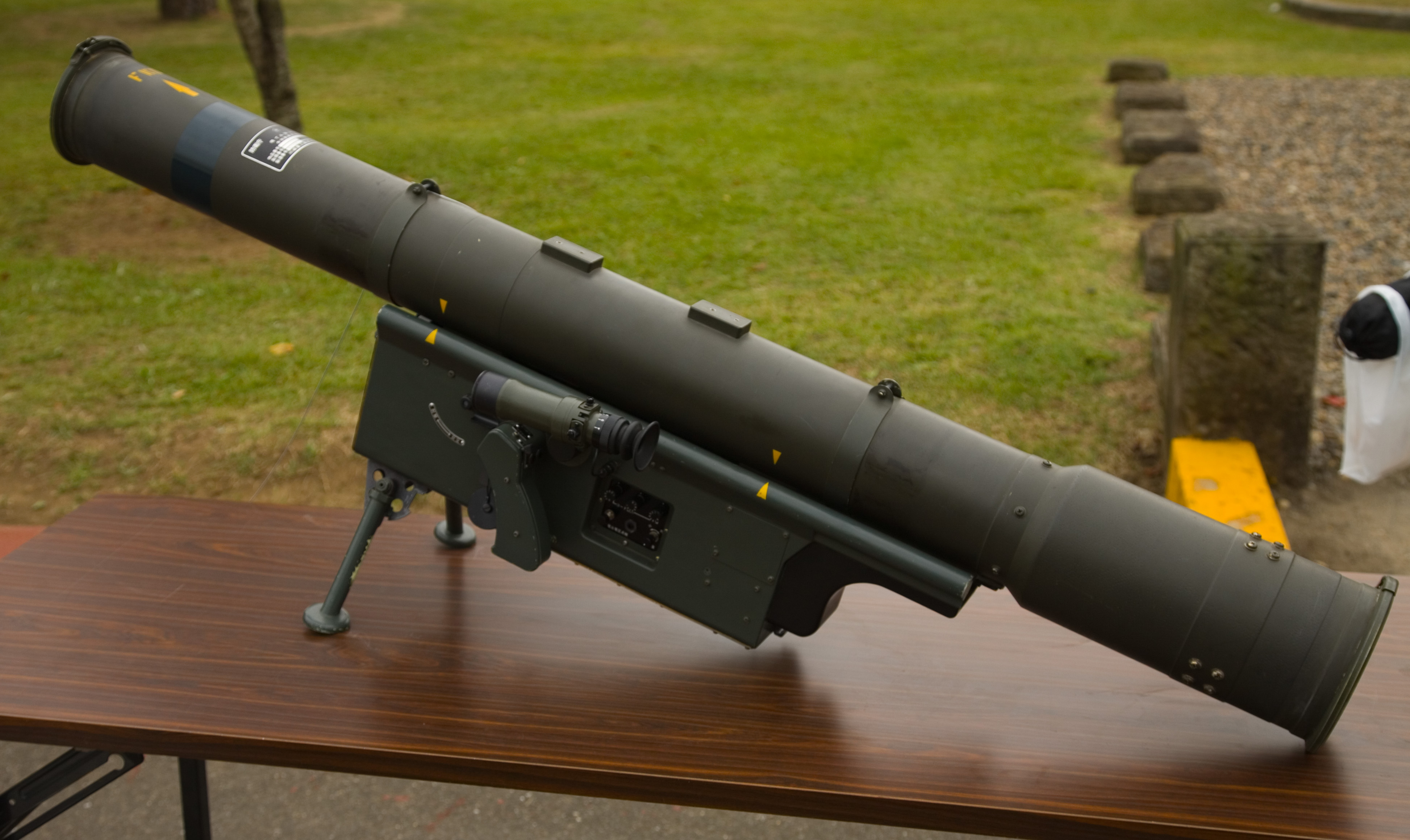
The launcher unit of the Type 87.

The Type 87 Chū-MAT (87式対戦車誘導弾, 87-shiki tai-sensha yūdō-dan) Chū-MAT is a Japanese laser guided anti-tank missile in service with the Japanese Ground Self-Defense Forces. Intended as a front-line replacement for the Type 64 MAT, it has entered into service alongside the SACLOS guided Type 79 Jyu-MAT.

== History ==
Development of the system began in 1976, missile trials were conducted in 1982, and a complete prototype system delivered in 1985. The first units entered service with the JGSDF in 1989. The system consists of a launcher, and a laser designator mounted on a heavy tripod.

=== Future Plans ===
The Defense Agency's Technical Research and Developmental Institute has begun conducting tests on a new anti-tank missile that will eventually replace the Type 87 in front-line service. The project's code name is known in the JSDF as the Shin Chu-MAT.

== Design ==
The unit is situated on a tripod unit with the missile launcher and laser designator on it. The designator and launcher can be separated from each other by up to 200 meters, or can be mounted together on the same tripod, although Jane's notes that the exhaust gas from the missile may interrupt the designator laser. Its seeker was developed by NEC Corporation.

Like the Type 64 MAT and the Type 79 Jyu-MAT, it can be mounted onto a Mitsubishi Type 73 jeep or the Komatsu LAV for anti-armor roles.

== See also ==
- Type 64 MAT – (Japan)
- Type 79 Jyu-MAT – (Japan)
- Type 01 LMAT – (Japan)

== Bibliography ==
- Jones, Richard D.; Ness, Leland S., eds. (2010). Jane's Infantry Weapons 2010-2011. Jane's Publishing. ISBN 978-0710629081.
