= Type 79 Jyu-MAT =

Japanese anti-tank/landing-craft guided missile

Type 79 Jyu-MAT / 79 Tan-SSM
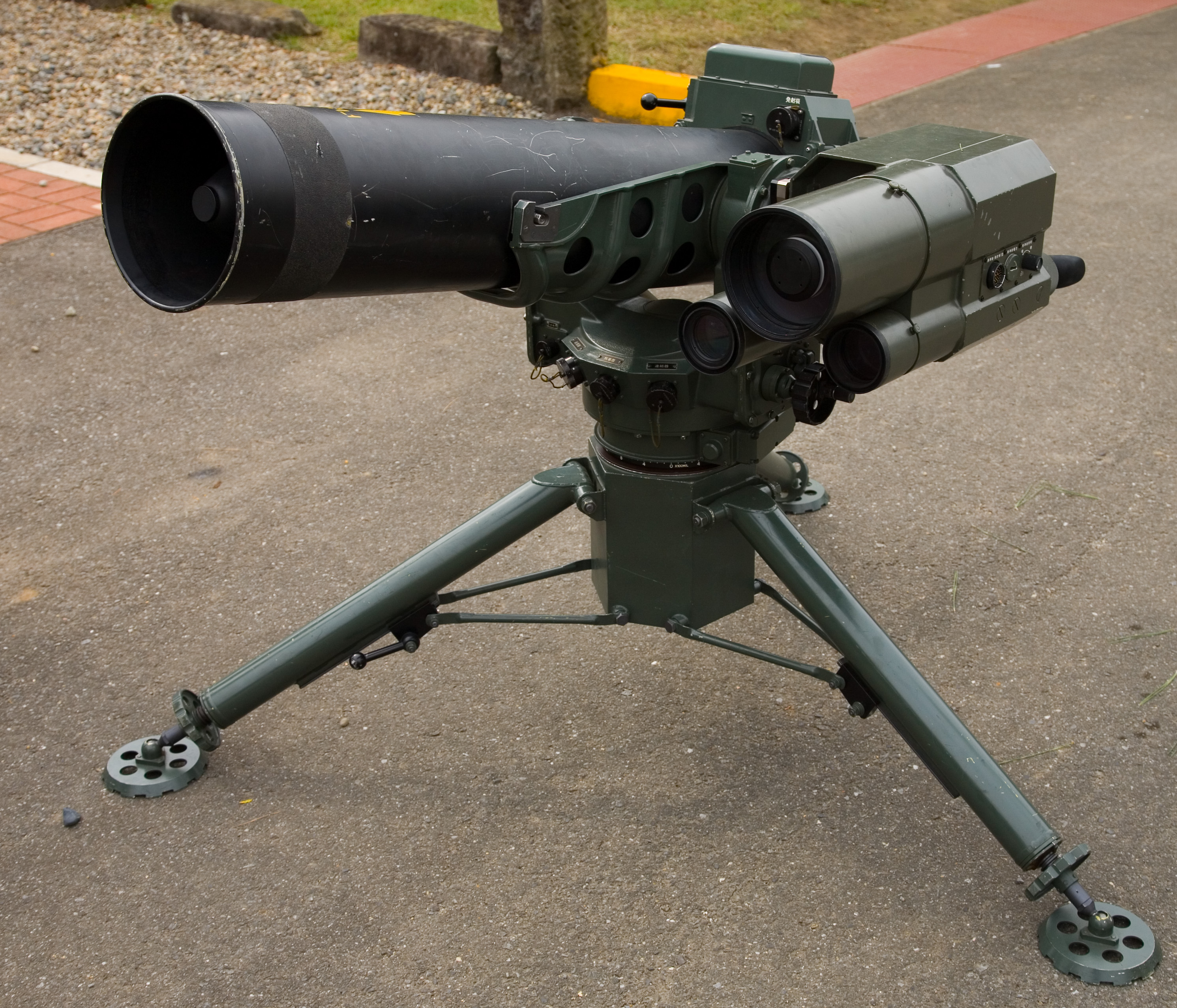
- A Type 79 LMAT launcher on display.
- Type: Heavy anti-tank/landing-craft guided missile
- Place of origin: Japan

Service history
- In service: 1984 to present
- Used by: Japan

Production history
- Designer: Defense Agency Technical Research and Development Institute
- Manufacturer: Kawasaki Heavy Industries
- Produced: 1980 to present

Specifications
- Mass: 33 kg missile
- Length: 1.5 m
- Diameter: 153 mm
- Crew: 1
- Warhead: Shaped charge on tanks/armored vehicles Fragmentation charged warhead for landing vessels and ships.
- Warhead weight: 4.2 kg
- Detonation mechanism: Impact or delayed impact
- Maximum speed: 200 m/s
- Guidance system: Wire guided SACLOS

The Type 79 Jyu-MAT (79式対舟艇対戦車誘導弾, 79-shiki tai-shūtei tai-sensha yūdō-dan) is a Japanese SACLOS guided anti-tank missile that entered service with the JGSDF in 1984. It was initially issued to coastal defence units, intended to destroy troop and vehicle landing ships as they approached the shoreline. It is also known as KAM-9.

== Description ==
The missile is stored in a cylindrical transport container. On launch the missile is ejected from the tube by a solid rocket motor. After traveling a safe distance from the operator, the Daicel flight motor ignites and takes the missile to its cruising speed of approximately 200 meters per second.

The missile is a thin cylinder with two sets of four pop-up fins positioned along the body of the missile. The warhead is either a shaped charge for use against tanks, or a semi-armour piercing fragmentation type with a delayed-action fuze for use against landing vessels.

== Operation ==
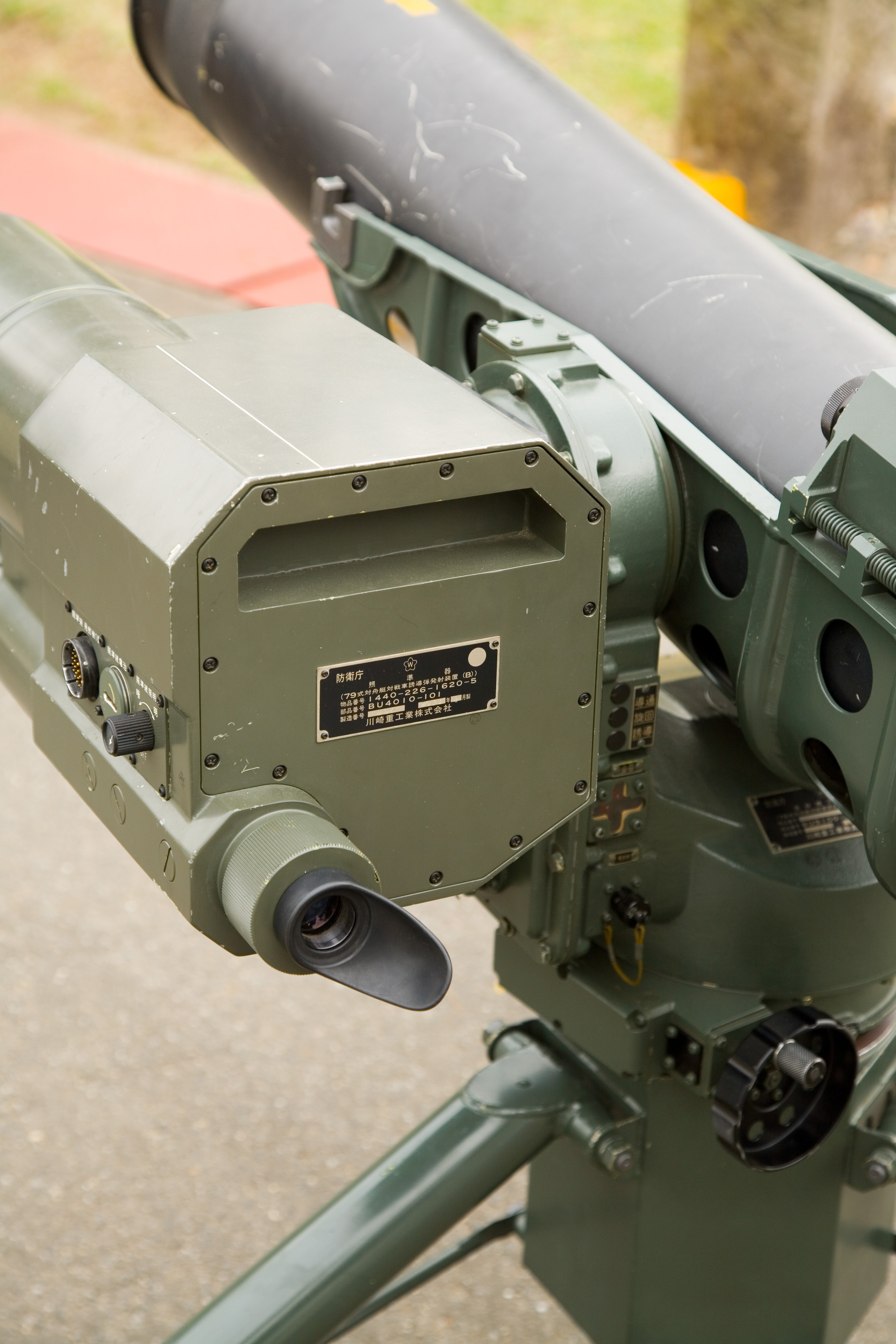
The operator's position on the Type 79

The missile is steered in flight by command signals from the launcher transmitted over a guidance wire spooled out behind the missile. A xenon lamp on the rear of the missile allows the NEC manufactured launcher sight unit to compute an offset between the missile position and line of sight to the target, and calculate steering corrections based on this offset.

The Type 79 missile can be fired remotely, at a distance of up to fifty meters from the tripod mounted guidance system. It can be mounted on a Mitsubishi Type 73 jeep, similar to the Type 64 MAT and the Type 87 Chu-MAT. The Type 79 is also in use with the Mitsubishi Type 89 IFV.

== See also ==
- Type 64 MAT – (Japan)
- Type 87 Chu-MAT – (Japan)
- Type 01 LMAT – (Japan)
