= Mitsubishi Type 73 light truck =

Japanese military medium-sized vehicle

Mitsubishi Type 73 light truck Kyū
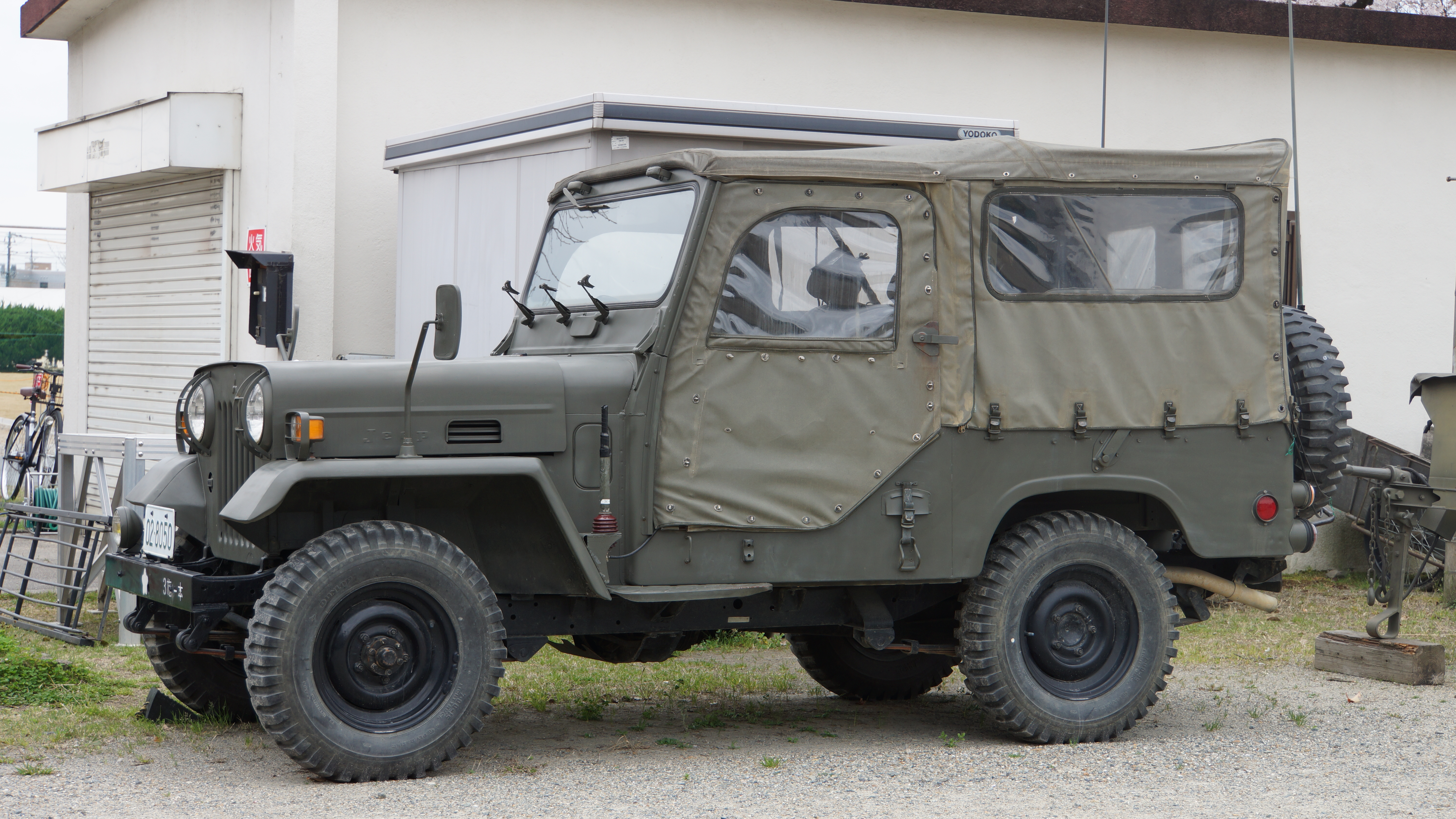
- A JGSDF Mitsubishi Type 73 light truck Kyū in Camp Okubo.
- Type: Mid-size off road vehicle
- Place of origin: Japan

Service history
- In service: 1973–1997

Production history
- Manufacturer: Mitsubishi Motors
- Produced: 1973–1997

Specifications
- Mass: 1,450 kg (3,197 lb)
- Length: 3,750 mm (147.6 in)
- Width: 1,650 mm (65.0 in)
- Height: 1,950 mm (76.8 in)
- Engine: Water-cooled 4-cycle, 4-cylinder Gasoline: 2.2l JH4, 2.3l KE47 Diesel 2.7l 4DR5 (naturally-aspirated & turbocharged), 4DR6 (direct injection, turbocharged)
- Transmission: Manual transmission

The Mitsubishi Type 73 light truck (73式小型トラック, 73-shiki kogata torakku) is a series of military light trucks that are used as mini SUVs in the JSDF. They have been under production by Mitsubishi Motors since 1973. In JSDF service, it is officially known as the 1/2 Ton Truck.

They are powered by Mitsubishi-made 4-cylinder diesel engines with a total of 123 horsepower.

== History ==
=== First generation ===
The first production of the Type 73, known as the Mitsubishi Type 73 light truck (Kyū) (73式小型トラック (旧), 73-shiki kogata torakku (kyū)) was based on the Jeep CJ-3Bs that Mitsubishi Motors had been producing under license from Willys. The first Type 73 Kyūs had been placed into production in 1973 with the chassis of the Jeep CJ-3B for basis before they made modifications based on it to create the Mitsubishi CJ-3B-J4 and the Mitsubishi CJ-3B-J4C before it was replaced again by producing the Mitsubishi CJ-5A-J54. Both gasoline and diesel variants were produced and a total over 200,000 units were made. Production continued on before it ended in 1997 after the Type 73 light trucks Shin were placed in production by 1996.

The Kyūs had been exported out of Japan, mostly declared as military surplus vehicles to the Philippines and South Vietnam with the latter using it as one of the main jeeps of the ARVN, next to the Willys M606, M38A1 and M151A1 during the course of the Vietnam War. They have also been exported to New Zealand for civilian use.

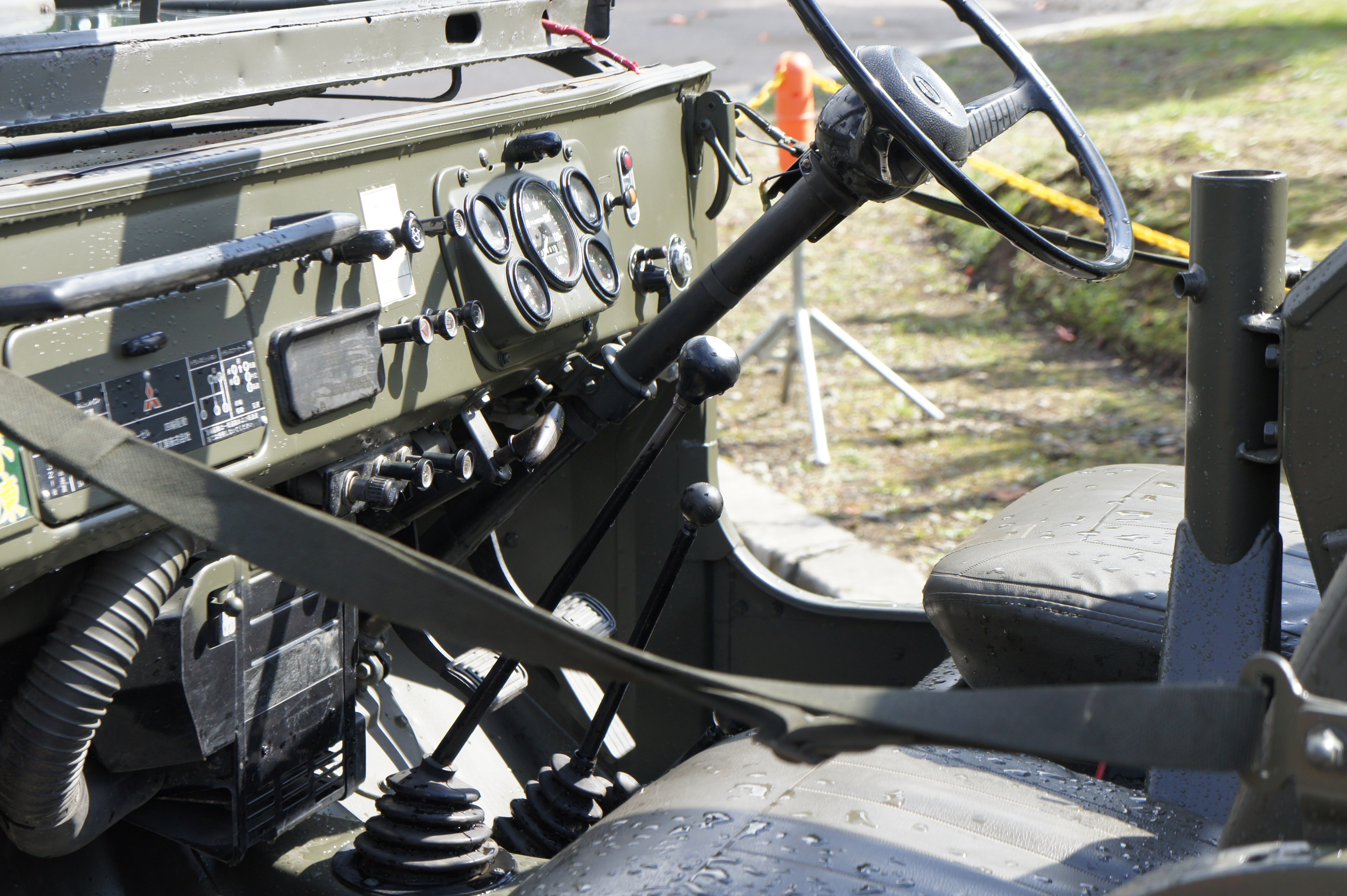
A closeup of the transmission shifter used in a Mitsubishi Type 73 light truck Kyū.

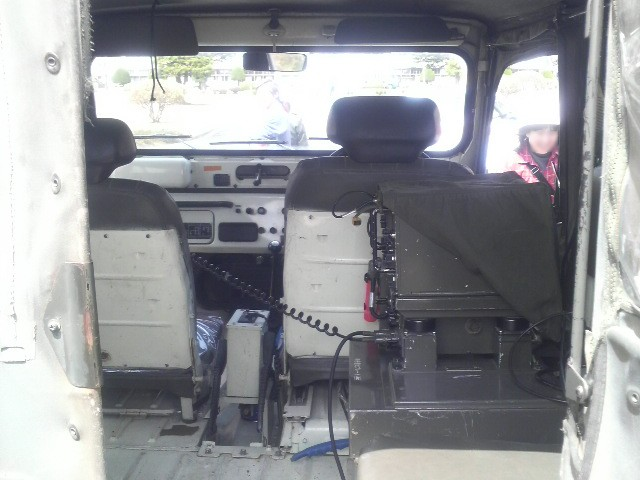
A view of the Mitsubishi Type 73 light truck Kyū as used by JGSDF MP officers. Note the mounted radio at the rear of the vehicle.

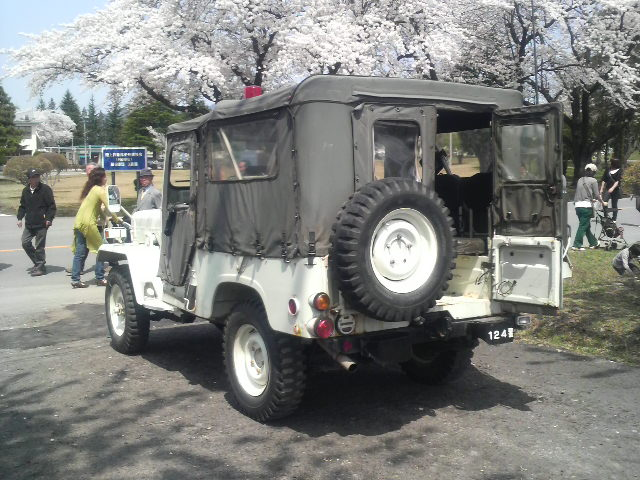
The side and rear portion of the Mitsubishi Type 73 light truck Kyū as used by JGSDF MP officers.

=== Second generation ===
Mitsubishi Type 73 light truck Shin 1/2 ton truck
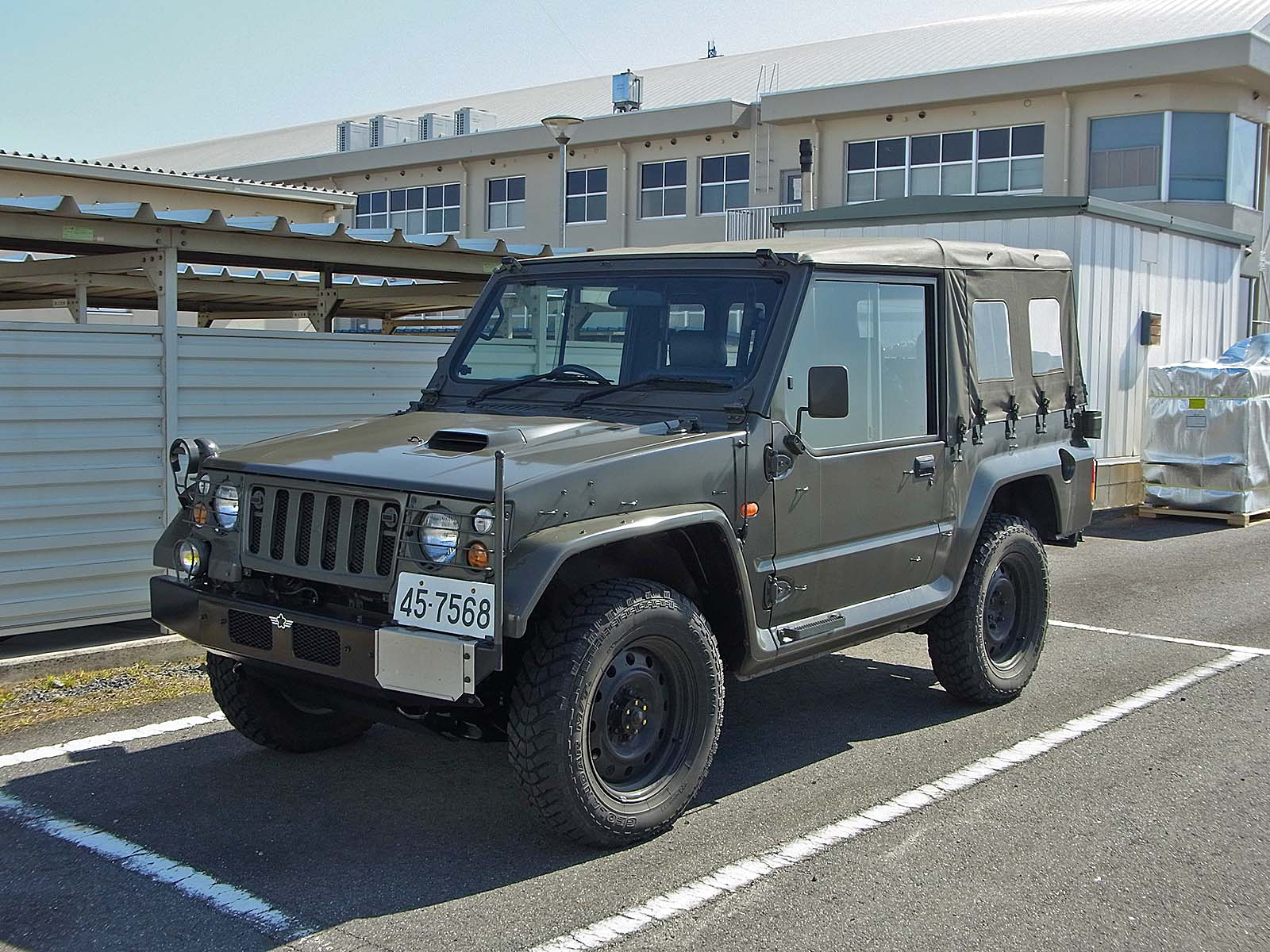
- A JGSDF Mitsubishi Type 73 light truck Shin.
- Type: Mid-size off road vehicle
- Place of origin: Japan

Service history
- In service: 1996–present

Production history
- Manufacturer: Mitsubishi Motors
- Produced: 1996–present

Specifications
- Mass: 1,940 kg (4,277 lb)
- Length: 4,140 mm (163.0 in)
- Width: 1,765 mm (69.5 in)
- Height: 1,970 mm (77.6 in)
- Engine: Water-cooled 4-cycle, 4-cylinder diesel engine 4M40 (1996-2013), 4N15 (2014-) 125 HP
- Transmission: 4-speed automatic transmission

The Mitsubishi Type 73 light truck (Shin) (73式小型トラック (新), 73-shiki kogata torakku (shin)) began production in 1996 as Mitsubishi Motors began to slowly phase out the Type 73 light trucks Kyū from production and from selective service in the JSDF, using the frame of the Mitsubishi Pajero as a basis.

The Type 73 light truck Shin can be mounted with various heavy machine guns and anti-tank missile launchers. But like its predecessor, the Shin light truck can mount Sumitomo M2 machine guns and, for the first time, the Sumitomo MINIMI light machine gun.

When Shin light trucks were deployed to Iraq as part of the JIRSG, the vehicles were bulletproofed due to concerns that Iraqi guerrillas would target their vehicles to provoke JSDF troops who, under the restrictions of Article 9 of the Japanese Constitution, are not supposed to participate in any kind of offensive combat operations.

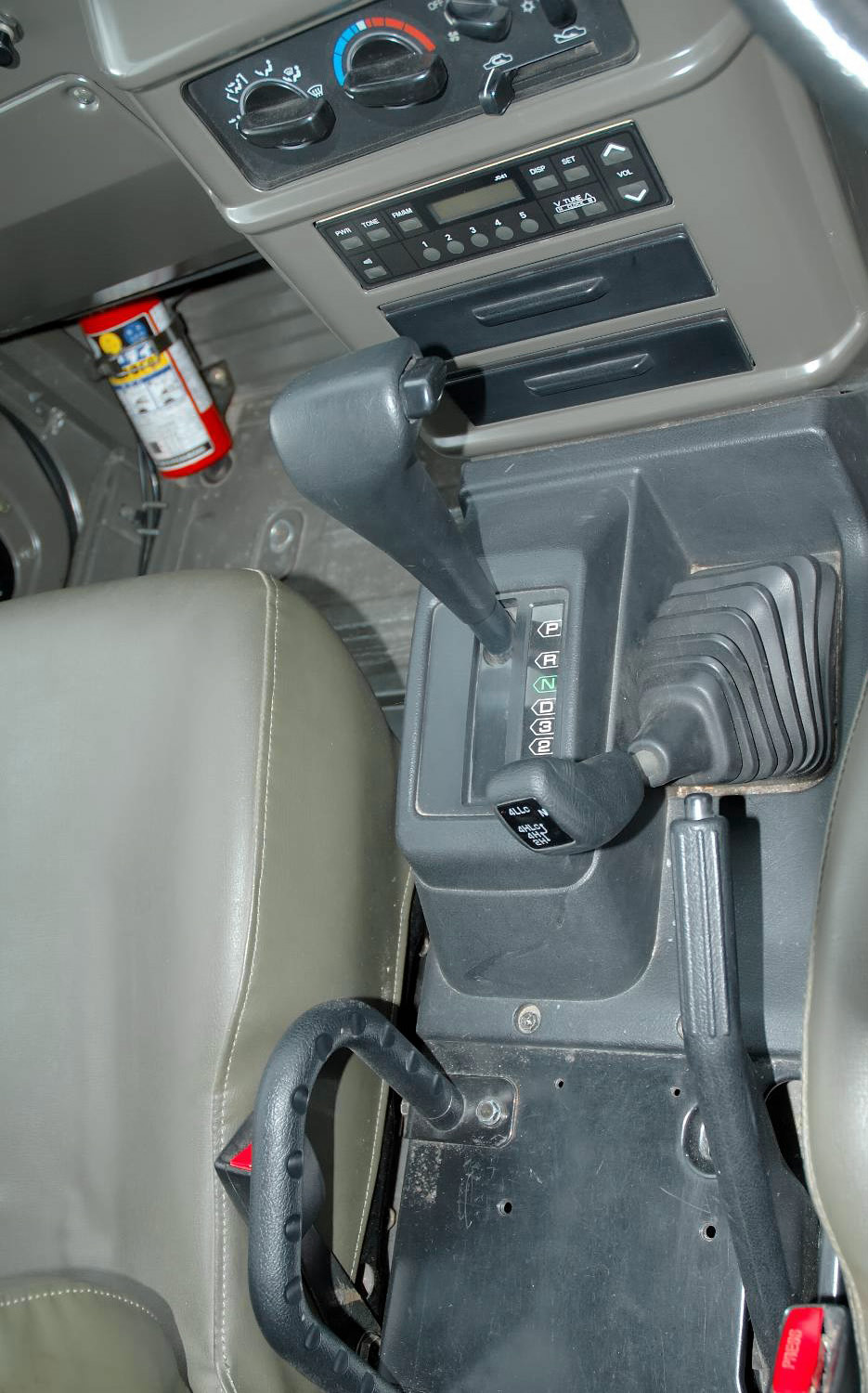
Transmission sticks inside a Mitsubishi Type 73 light truck Shin. On the left is the shifter for the automatic transmission, and on the right is the shifter for the transfer case (2WD H, 4WD H, 4WD H+Lc, 4WD L+Lc).

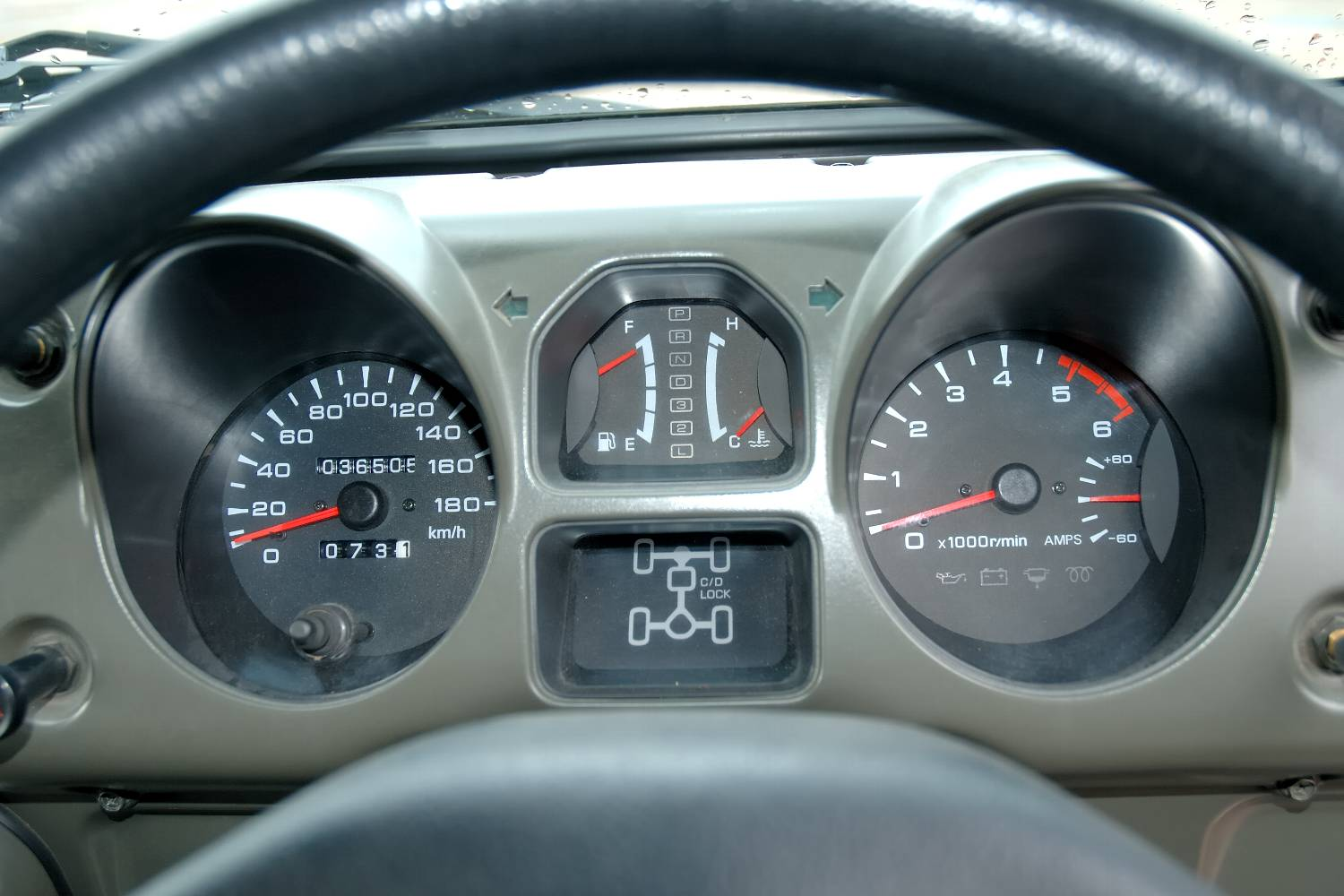
Instrument panel

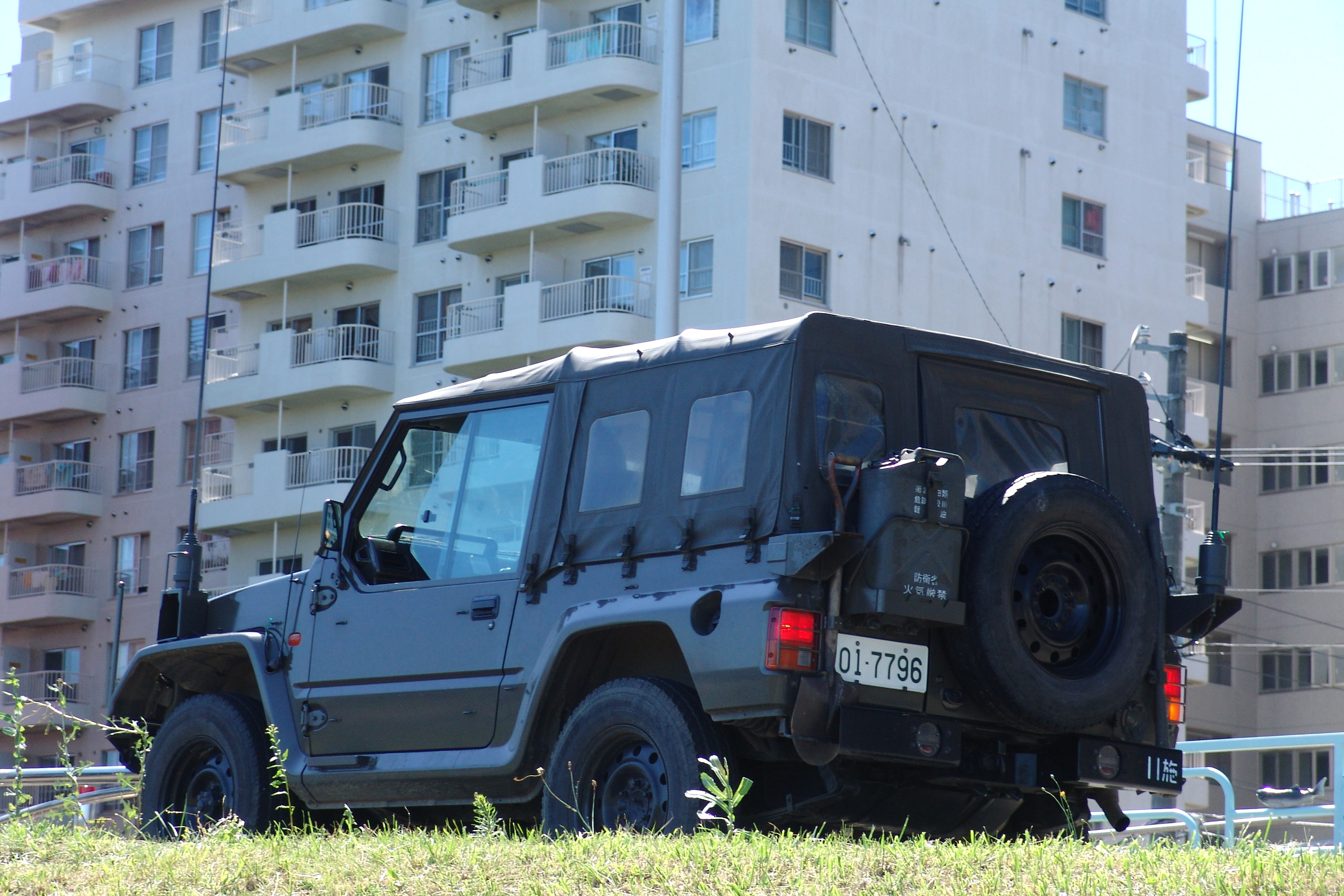
The side and rear of the Mitsubishi Type 73 light truck Shin.

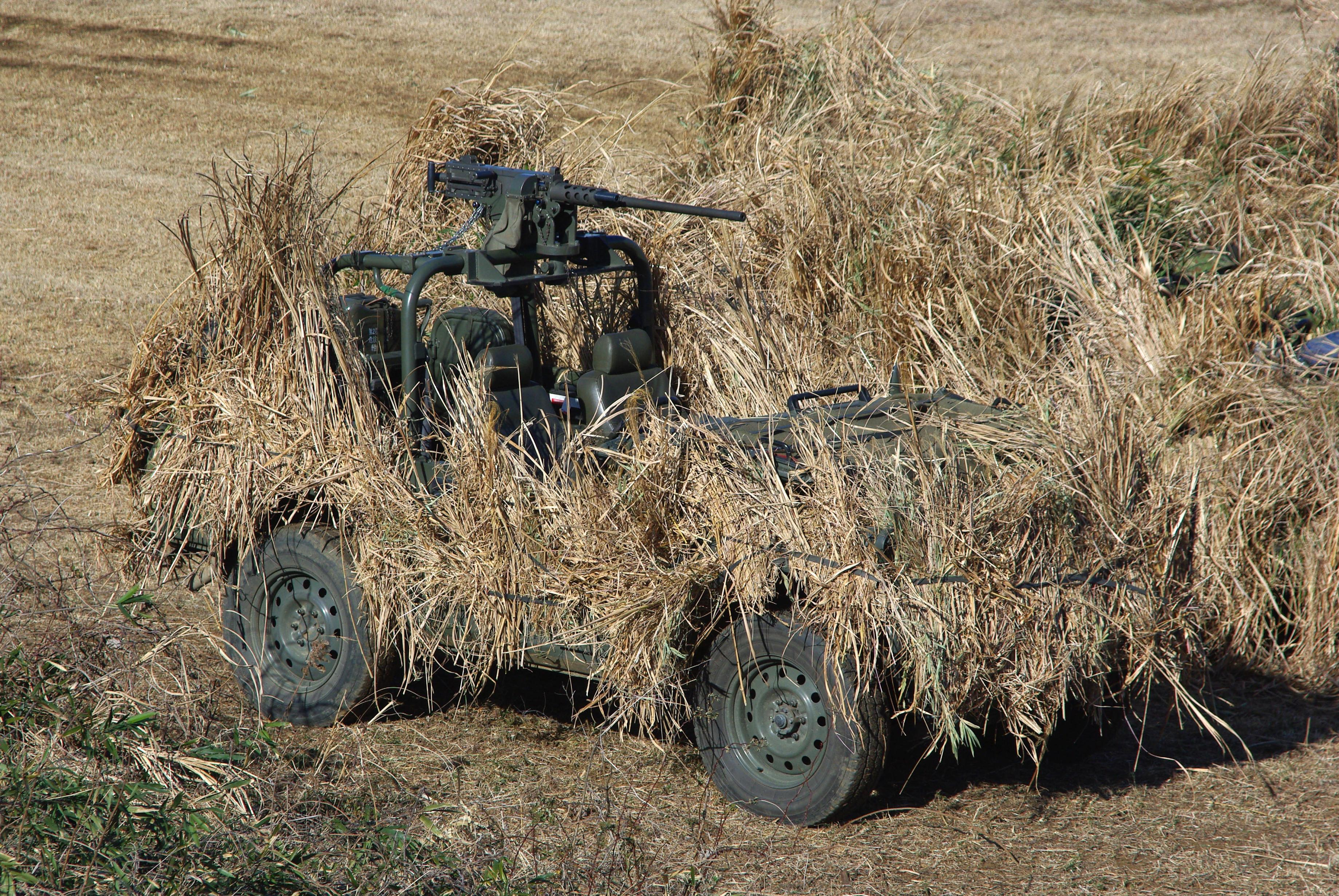
A Mitsubishi Type 73 light truck Shin outfitted with a M2 heavy machine gun and camouflage at Camp Narashino.

== Design ==
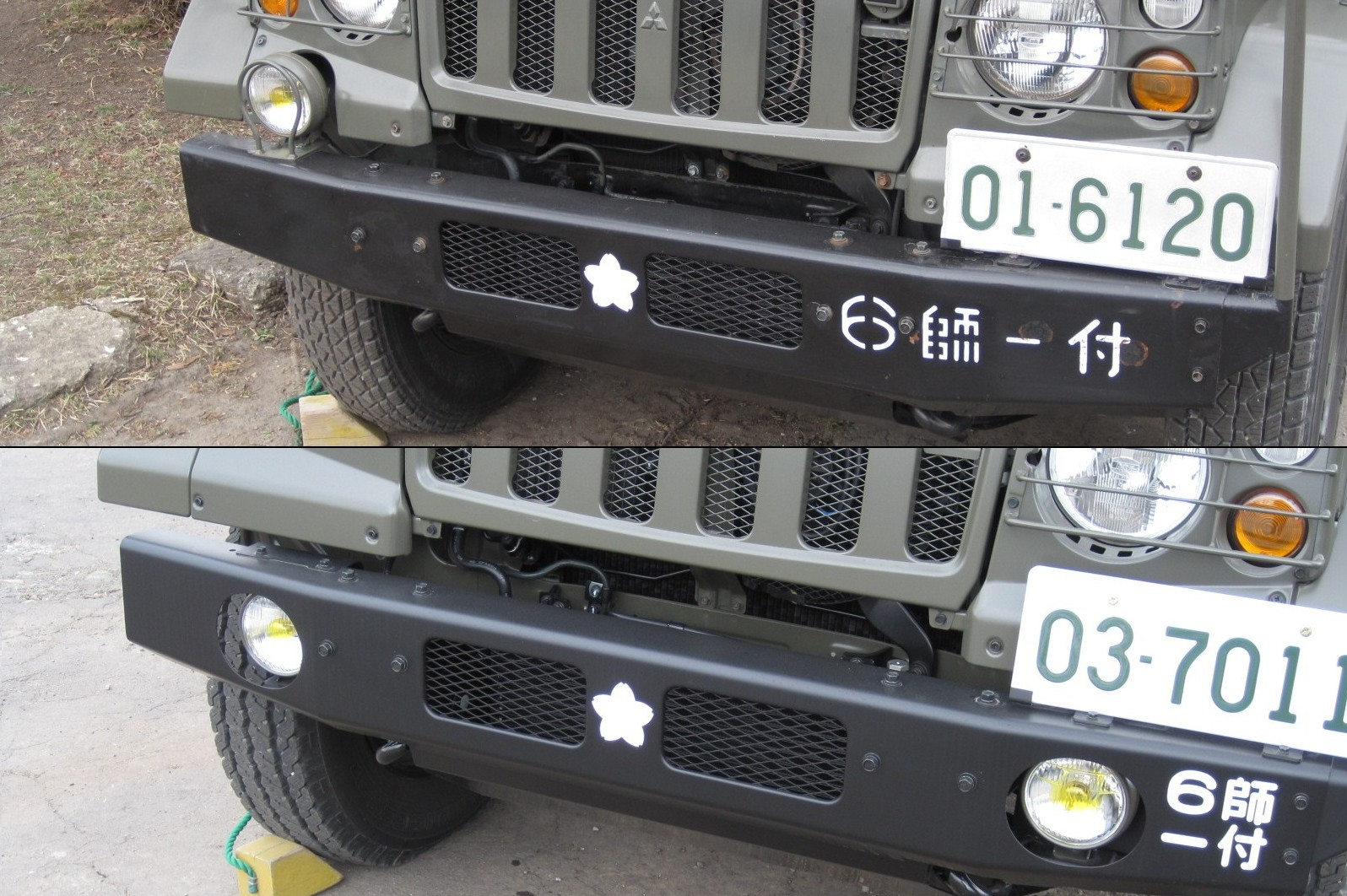
A comparison of an early Shin light truck bumper (above) and the revised bumper (below) with integrated fog lamps. The revision increased the number of fog lamps from one to two.

Both Kyū and Shin light truck vehicles can be outfitted with various weapon systems such as Kawasaki Type 64 anti-tank pods, Kawasaki Type 79 and Kawasaki Type 87 anti-tank missile launchers, Japan Steel Works Type 60 recoilless rifles, Sumitomo MINIMI LMGs and Sumitomo M2 machine guns to make them both a mobile anti-tank and anti-personnel vehicle.

Both light truck variants have the tarpaulin roof cover mounts at the rear as an option. They also have rear seats that can be folded up when they are not needed. Air conditioning is installed as a standard feature on the Shin variant.

== Variants ==
The base Kyu models for personnel and light cargo transport were designated J24A, J25A and J23A.

The'A2' versions carried a wireless communications system Type 3. 'P' versions carried a recoil-less rifle, 'K' versions an anti-tank guided missile launcher Type 87. 'G-E' and 'G-N' versions carried a Type 79 guided missile launcher for either anti-tank or anti-landing craft use. 'SR' versions carried a radar system and had jacks to stabilize the vehicle. The 'SH' version carried an orientation system while the 'SC' version carried a communication relay system. 'SR, 'SH' and 'SC' versions were all equipped with winches. Small numbers were produced with small megaphones, roof-mounted single beacons and grille flashers.

Light trucks painted in white were exclusively used by JSDF military police units.

== Users ==
=== Current ===
- Japan: Currently using the Shin light trucks in the JGSDF. Kyū light trucks have been decommissioned from some frontline units, though many are still in service.
- Philippines: Kyū trucks used as surplus vehicles by the Philippine Army.
- Thailand: Used by Royal Thai Army.
- Ukraine: Shin trucks being provided as military assistance in May 2023. In December 2023, the first Shin trucks have arrived in Ukraine.

=== Former ===
- South Vietnam - Formerly used by the ARVN.
