= M60 tank =

American second generation main battle tank

M60
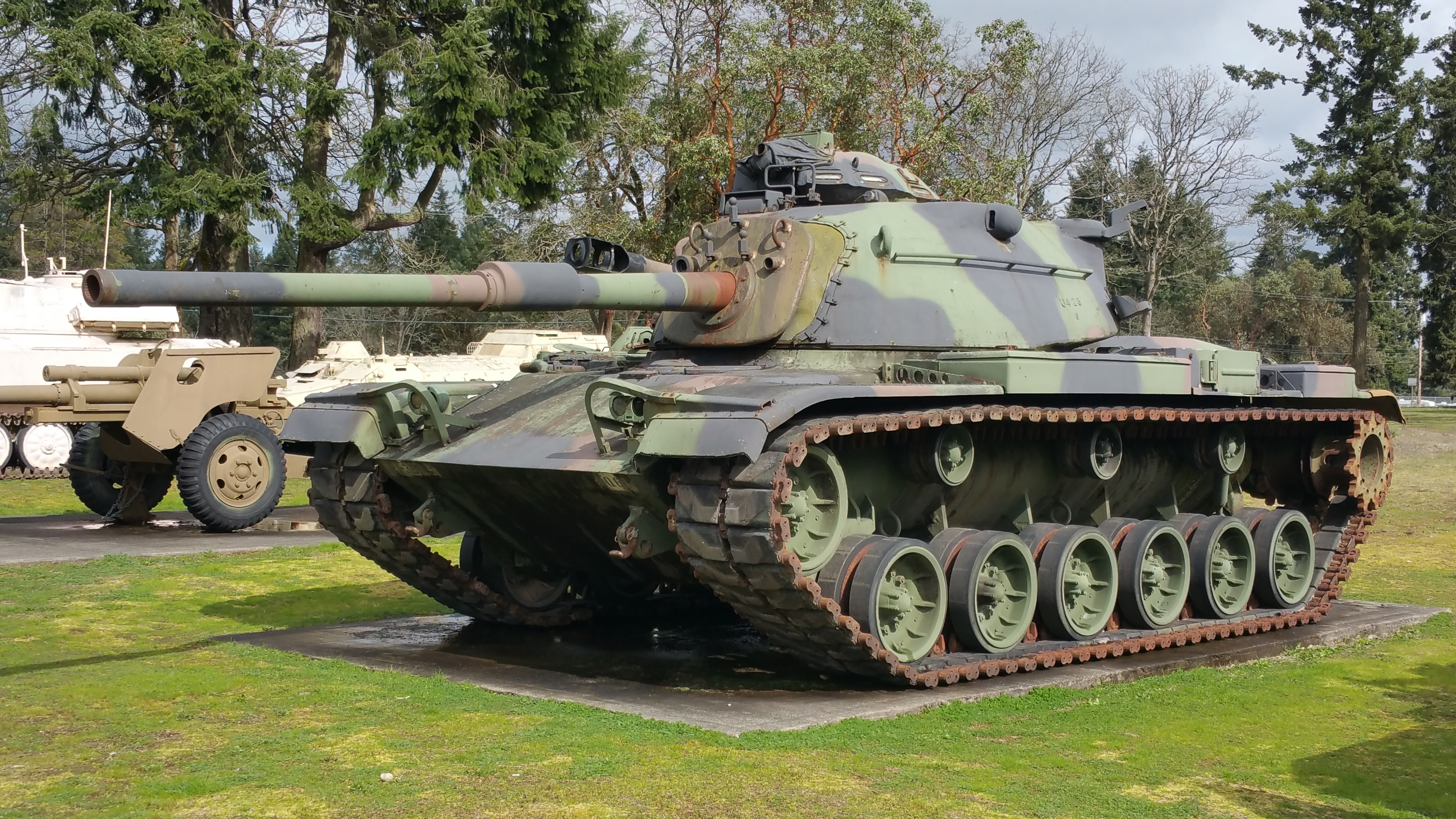
- Original M60 variant on display at the Lewis Army Museum in 2016, with canvas mantlet cover removed
- Type: Main battle tank
- Place of origin: United States

Service history
- In service: 1959–present (Note: United States Army (1959–2005), United States Marine Corps (1962–1991))
- Used by: See Operators
- Wars: Cold War; Yom Kippur War; Western Sahara War; Ogaden War; Iran–Iraq War; Invasion of Grenada; Lebanese Civil War; 1982 Lebanon War; Multinational Force in Lebanon; Persian Gulf War; Operation Desert Shield; Operation Desert Storm; Yemeni Civil War (1994); 2011 Bahraini uprising; Houthi insurgency in Yemen; Kurdish–Turkish conflict; 2008–2011 Cambodia–Thailand border crisis; Sinai insurgency; Turkish military intervention in the Syrian Civil War; Yemeni Civil War; Saudi Arabian-led intervention in Yemen; Turkish military intervention in the Second Libyan Civil War; Sudanese civil war (2023–present); 2025 Cambodia‒Thailand conflict

Production history
- Designer: Chrysler Defense Engineering
- Designed: 1957
- Manufacturer: Chrysler Corporation Delaware Defense Plant (1959; initial low-rate production); Detroit Arsenal Tank Plant (1960–1983)
- Developed from: M48 Patton
- Unit cost: M60: $481,911 (1962); M60A1RISE: $703,278 (1976); M60A2: $726,712 (1974); M60A3TTS: $1.292 million (1990)
- Produced: M60: 1959–1962; M60A1: 1962–1980; M60A2: 1973–1975; M60A3: 1978–1983
- No. built: Over 15,000 (all variants)
- Variants: See Variants

Specifications (M60A1)
- Mass: 52.6 short tons (47.7 t; 47.0 long tons)
- Length: 6.946 m (22 ft 9.5 in) (hull), 9.309 m (30 ft 6.5 in) (gun forward)
- Width: 3.631 m (11 ft 11.0 in)
- Height: 3.27 m (10 ft 9 in)
- Crew: 4
- Armor: Upper glacis: 4.29 in (109 mm) at 65° 10.15 in (258 mm) LoS; Turret front: equals 10 in (250 mm)
- Main armament: M68 105 mm (4.1 in)
- Secondary armament: 1 x M73/MM219 7.62 x 51 mm coaxial machine gun .50 BMG (12.7×99mm) M85 machine gun on commanders cupola (Note: 7.62×51mm NATO M73 machine gun (after 1972 redesignated as M219) or M240C (after 1978))
- Engine: Continental AVDS-1790-2 V12, air-cooled twin-turbo diesel engine 750 bhp (560 kW)
- Power/weight: 15.08 bhp/st (12.4 kW/tonne)
- Transmission: General Motors, cross-drive, single-stage with 2 forward and 1 reverse ranges
- Suspension: Torsion bar suspension
- Ground clearance: 1 foot 6.2 inches (0.463 m)
- Fuel capacity: 385 US gal (1,457 L)
- Operational range: 300 miles (500 km)
- Maximum speed: 30 mph (48 km/h) (road); 12 mph (19 km/h) (cross country)

The M60 is an American second-generation main battle tank (MBT). It was officially standardized as the Tank, Combat, Full Tracked: 105-mm Gun, M60 in March 1959. Although developed from the M48 Patton, the M60 tank series was never officially christened as a Patton tank. It has been called a "product-improved descendant" of the Patton tank's design. The design similarities are evident comparing the original version of the M60 and the M48A2. The United States fully committed to the MBT doctrine in 1963, when the Marine Corps retired the last (M103) heavy tank battalion. The M60 tank series became the American primary main battle tank during the Cold War, reaching a production total of 15,000 M60s. Hull production ended in 1983, but 5,400 older models were converted to the M60A3 variant ending in 1990.

The M60 reached operational capability upon fielding to US Army European units beginning in December 1960. The first combat use of the M60 was by Israel during the 1973 Yom Kippur War, where it saw service under the "Magach 6" designation, performing well in combat against comparable tanks such as the T-62. The Israelis again used the M60 during the 1982 Lebanon War, equipped with upgrades such as explosive reactive armor to defend against guided missiles that proved very effective at destroying tanks. The M60 also saw use in 1983 during Operation Urgent Fury, supporting US Marines in an amphibious assault on Grenada. M60s delivered to Iran also served in the Iran–Iraq War.

The United States' largest deployment of M60s was in the 1991 Gulf War, where the US Marines equipped with M60A1s effectively defeated Iraqi armored forces, including T-72 tanks. The United States retired the M60 from front-line combat after Operation Desert Storm, with the last tanks being retired from National Guard service in 1997. M60-series vehicles continue in front-line service with a number of countries' militaries, though most of these have been highly modified and had their firepower, mobility, and protection upgraded to increase their combat effectiveness on the modern battlefield.

The M60 has undergone many updates over its service life. The interior layout, based on the design of the M48, provided ample room for updates and improvements, extending the vehicle's service life for over four decades. It was widely used by the US and its Cold War allies, especially those in NATO, and remains in service throughout the world, despite having been superseded by the M1 Abrams in the US military. The tank's hull was the basis for a wide variety of prototype, utility, and support vehicles such as armoured recovery vehicles, bridge layers and combat engineering vehicles. As of 2015, Egypt is the largest operator with 1,716 upgraded M60A3s, Turkey is second with 866 upgraded units including M60T tanks in service, and Saudi Arabia is third with over 650 units.

== Development ==
=== Impetus ===
The United States entered a period of frenzied activity during the crisis atmosphere of the Korean War, when America seemed to lag behind the Soviet Union in terms of tank quality and quantity. Testing and development cycles occurred simultaneously with production to ensure speedy delivery of new tanks. Such rapid production caused problems but the importance given to rapidly equipping combat units with new tanks precluded detailed testing and evaluation prior to quantity production.

The M47 Patton entered production in 1951 and was used by the United States Army and Marine Corps but ongoing technical and production problems kept it from serving in the Korean War. The M48 Patton tank entered US service in 1952 but its early designs were deemed unsatisfactory by Army Field Forces (AFF). The improvements to the M48 focused on improving the 90 mm main gun and fire control systems while simultaneously exploring the development of silicas glass composite armor and autoloader systems. The tank continued further development through 1955 in conjunction with its simultaneous mass production. The course of its development during the mid-1950s was the source of widespread debate among Congressional Budget Oversight committees.

The T95 program, which began in 1955 was intended to supersede the M48, featured a host of innovative and experimental components such as its 90mm smoothbore T208 cannon rigidly affixed to its turret, experimental X-shaped engine design using a vapor-cycle power plant fueled by hydrocarbons, composite armor and infrared rangefinder. The burden of developing them, however, slowed the overall program to a crawl.

During the Hungarian Revolution of 1956, a Soviet T-54A medium tank was driven onto the grounds of the British embassy in Budapest by the Hungarians in November. After a brief examination of this tank's armor by British military attaché Lt Col Noel Cowley, it was concluded that the 84 mm 67 caliber long QF 20-pounder of the Centurion tank was apparently incapable of consistently defeating its frontal armor with either High-Explosive Anti-Tank (HEAT) or Armor-Piercing Capped (APC) ammunition. Its 100 mm gun was a significant advancement over the weapon of the T-44. There were also rumors of an even larger 115 mm gun in the works. These events spurred the United Kingdom to begin upgrading existing tanks with a 105 mm high-velocity rifled gun in 1958, the Royal Ordnance L7 to keep the Centurion viable against this new Soviet tank design. The United States responded by starting development of the XM60 tank in September 1957. This new tank design incorporated many Army Combat Vehicle (ARCOVE) committee improvements to the M48A2, chiefly the use of diesel engines to increase its operational range and the use of a more powerful main gun.

=== Choice of components ===
==== M68 105 mm main gun ====
The main gun was chosen after a comparative firing test of six different guns carried out on the Aberdeen Proving Ground in 1958. The factors evaluated were accuracy, lethality of a hit, rate of fire and penetration performance.

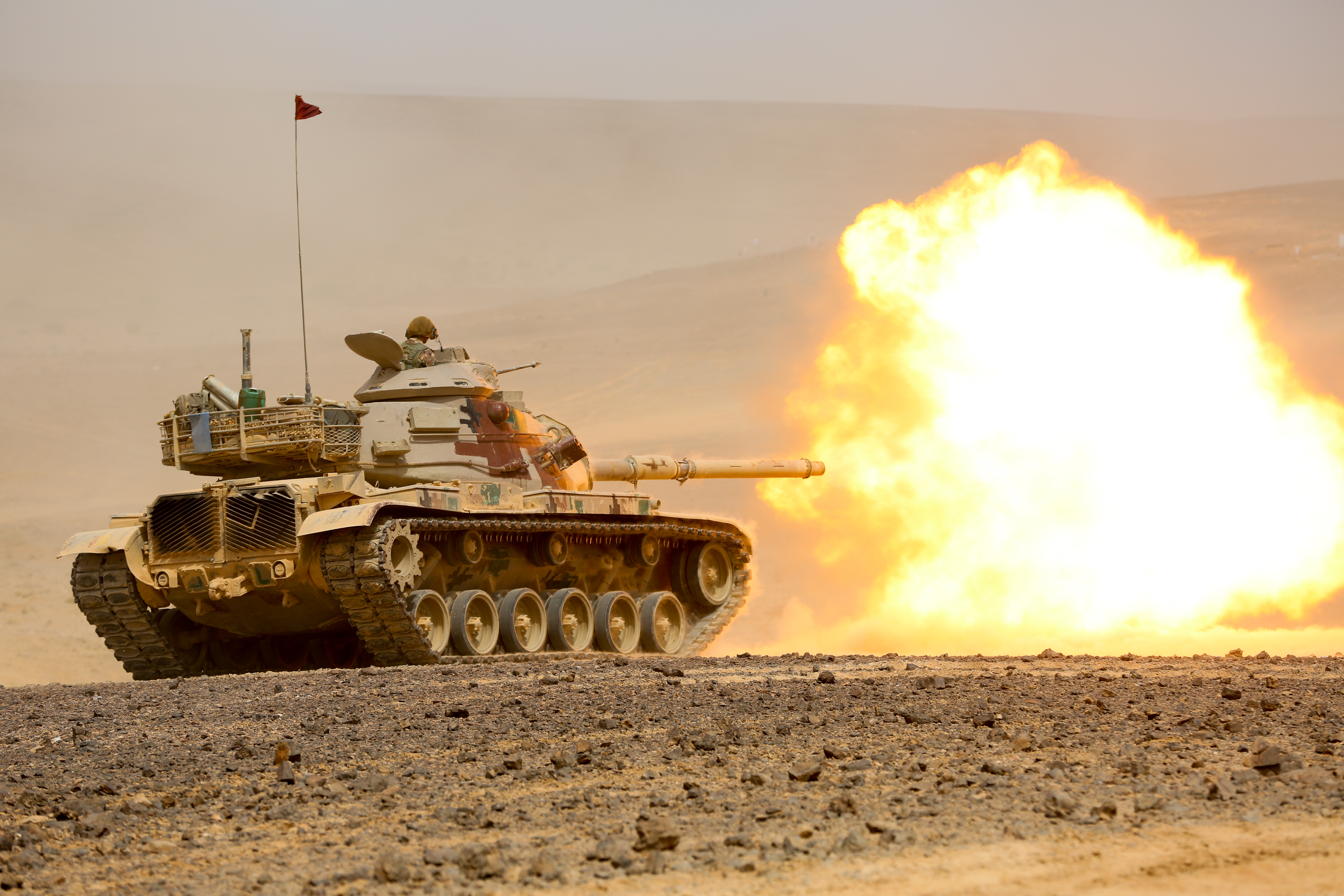
A Jordanian M60A3 firing its main gun in 2015

An M48A2C was fitted with the 90 mm M41 and tested with the new T300E53 HEAT round. A smoothbore version of the 90 mm, the T208E9, was mounted on the T95E1 tank and tested the T320E62 Armour-Piercing Discarding Sabot (APDS) round. An American variant of the British Royal Ordnance L7 tank gun, under the US designation 105 mm T254E1, was mounted on the T95E2 and tested with British APDS ammunition. Finally, two versions of the 120 mm gun from the M103 were trialed, the existing M58 model and a lightened variant known as T123E6 which was mounted on the T95E4.

The T123E6 was preferred by the Ordnance Department because its ammunition, the same as that for the M58 gun, was already at an advanced state of development. However, the ammunition was in two parts, shell and propellant bag, which required significant time to load. In the M103 this was addressed by adding a second loader, but a medium tank would not have the internal space needed for another crewmember and the firing rate would suffer as a result. In testing it demonstrated a maximum rate of four rounds per minute vs. the seven rounds per minute for the T254.

Based on these tests, the 105 mm T254E1 was selected, modified to the T254E2, and standardized as the "Cannon, 105 mm Gun, M68". It used a vertical drop breechblock instead of the T254E1's horizontal sliding breechblock. Until American-made barrels could be obtained with comparable accuracy, British barrels were to be used. US built XM24/L52 barrels - 218.5 in (5,550 mm) in length - fitted with an eccentric bore evacuator were used for the M60-series starting in June 1959 but retained interchangeability with the British X15/L52 barrel.

All of the US guns and XM24 barrels were produced at the Watervliet Arsenal, NY and the gun mounts were manufactured at the Rock Island Arsenal, IL. Because the evacuator was positioned lower on the gun's barrel US M68 guns were fitted with an eccentric bore evacuator instead of a concentric model in order to provide more clearance over the rear deck.

The M68E1 gun shares the same firing characteristics as the M68. It featured several design improvements including an updated gun hydraulic configuration, a stabilization upgrade for the gun, a gun elevation kill switch for the loader, improved ballistic drive allowing the accurate firing of long dart penetrators and other component refinements.

The gun is capable of using a wide range of ammunition including APDS-Tracer (APDS-T) (M392 and M728), Armour-Piercing Fin-Stabilized Discarding Sabot-Tracer (APFSDS-T) (M735 and M774), APFSDS Depleted uranium (DU) (APFSDS-DU) (M833), HEAT-FS (M456), APDS dummy and target practice rounds, High Explosive Plastic (HEP)/ High-Explosive Squash Head (HESH) (M393), white phosphorus and canister rounds. Barrels with thermal sleeves were used starting in 1973.

Both the original M60 variant as well as the initial configuration of the M60A1 used the M68 gun. M60A1 RISE (Reliability Improved Selected Equipment) Passive tanks built after 1977 and all M60A3 tanks were armed with the M68E1 variant of the gun. It had an improved ballistic drive to allow for accurate firing of the M735 APFSDS ammunition.

==== Armor ====
Composite armor made with fused silica glass sandwiched between plates of steel were intended to be fitted to the hull. This led to a redesign of the front of the hull into the shape of a flat wedge, instead of the M48's elliptical front, as it simplified the installation of this armor. It was also envisioned that the T95E6 turret was to be constructed solely with this special armor. The US Army Ordnance Tank Automotive Command (OTAC) and the Carnegie Institute of Technology began development of the armor in November 1952 at Fort Belvoir VA as Project TT2-782/51 using examples of the T95 tank to conduct the ballistics testing.

This composite armor provides protection against HEAT, HEP/HESH and HE rounds. However, field repaired panel castings suffered a loss of kinetic energy protection. Limitations in manufacturing capacity and the added cost led to this armor being dropped by November 1958 and all M60-series tanks were protected with conventional steel armor but the tank retained the capability to employ armor panels.

The M60 was the last tank to feature an escape hatch under the hull. The escape hatch was provided for the driver, whose top-side hatch could easily be blocked by the main gun.

There were two versions of hulls used for the M60-series. The M60 hull had a straight slope and beak compared to the earlier M48's rounded one. The hull bottom had a strong boat-like appearance with a pronounced recess between the upper tracks and external suspension arms and one shock absorber on the first roadwheel pair. The armor was improved, at 6 inches (155 mm) on the front glacis and mantle of solid rolled homogeneous armor, while it was 4.3 inches (110 mm) on the M48. The first prototype hulls did not have shock absorbers and were briefly named M68 in late 1958 before the Ordnance Department renamed it the M60 in March 1959. This hull version was used only on the original M60 variant and early M728 Combat Engineer Vehicles (CEVs) and M60 Armored Vehicle Launched Bridges (AVLBs). This hull model was in production from 1959 to 1962.

The M60A1 hull has basically the same visual characteristics, the noticeable difference was the addition of a second shock absorber at the second roadwheel pair and was also accompanied by a slight relocation of the first return roller. These modifications were needed due to the increased weight of the M60A1 turret as well as the additional hull armor. This hull model was used on the M60A1, M60A2 and M60A3 models of the M60-series as well as the M728A1 CEV and M60A1 AVLB. It was in production from 1962 to 1983.

The M60-series went through a progressive turret design scheme during its production life with four different turrets being manufactured for the M60-series. The T95E5 turret used on the M60 was hemispherically shaped and bore a strong resemblance to the M48 Patton. The M60A1 was the first version to employ the newly designed T95E7 turret with a redesigned bustle increasing the number of rounds for the main gun to 63. The M60A2 featured a specially designed turret for the M162 gun/missile launcher that greatly reduced the frontal arc in comparison to the M60A1's T95E7 turret. The M60A3's turret was similar to the A1's but with increased armor protection for the frontal arc and mantlet in an effort to provide additional protection of the turret's hydraulics system.

==== M19 commander's cupola ====
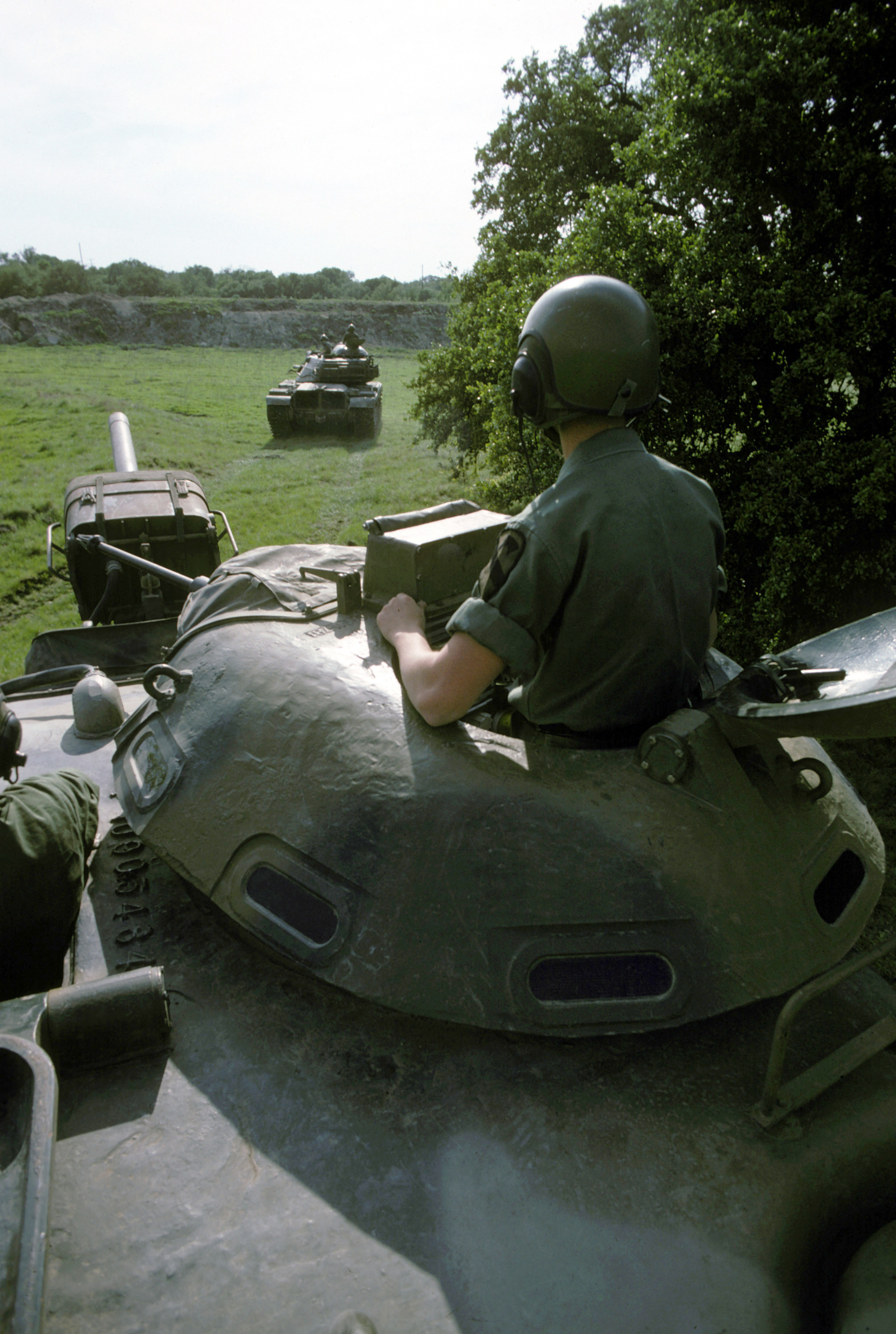
A detailed view of the M19 commander's cupola on an M60A1 vehicle of later production

A redesigned full vision cupola was envisioned for the commander's station. It had 7 tiltable vision blocks arranged to give the commander a 360 degree field of view with overlapping vision between adjacent vision blocks. The front vision block could be replaced with a dual power M34 7×50 binocular day sight or an M19E1 Infrared (IR) periscope. A special feature was that the cupola body could be raised up to 3.5 in (89 mm), providing the commander a direct field of vision while remaining under armor protection.

Access was through a hatch cover on the roof and a .50 caliber (12.7 mm) M2 machine gun was pedestal mounted on the forward part of the cupola. It could be aimed and fired with the cupola closed. Also there was an 11 in (280 mm) long port on the left side allowing spent cartridge cases to be ejected.

After creating a full-sized mock up of this design using the T95E6 turret, it was dropped in favor of a design based on the M1 cupola of the M48A2's turret. This T9 cupola provided the commander with more headroom than the T6 cupola of the T95 tank, carrying a new short receiver 0.5 cal M85/T175 machine gun and it was standardized as the "Cupola, Tank Commander's Caliber .50 Machine Gun, M19". The first M19 cupola (a modified T9) was ready on 27 October 1958. It has an M28C sight for the machine gun in the forward part of the cupola and eight vision blocks. The front vision block can be replaced by a M19E1 infrared periscope or an M36E1 passive periscope for night observation.

Initial production of the cupola was problematic. The first 300 M60s produced were armed with a .50cal M2HB machine gun in a pedestal mount welded to the left side of the commander's cupola owing to production problems with the new M85 machine gun. Of these tanks, the first 45 manufactured were made without the cupola itself, also due to production problems. All of these early M60s eventually had the M19 cupola and M85 machine gun installed.

Due to the rapid developments in jet aircraft and helicopters the remote-controlled M85 machine gun was relatively ineffective in the anti-aircraft role for which it was designed. Removing the cupola lowered the vehicle's relatively high silhouette. The cupola's hatch also opened toward the rear of the vehicle and was dangerous to close if under small-arms fire owing to a lock-open mechanism that required the user to apply leverage to unlock it prior to closing. The commander was able to observe the battlefield using the x4 binocular M34D daylight vision block or the M19E1 IR or M36 Passive periscopes while remaining under armor protection with a 360 degree traverse independent of the turret, was stabilized in azimuth and elevation and carried 600 rounds of ammunition.

All M60s in US service retained the M19 cupola until the tank was phased out of service. The few M60A3s in Army service as training vehicles had their commander's cupola removed as it was deemed unnecessary for training and to better mimic the profile of Soviet tanks. Some M48A5s were retrofitted with the M19 cupola to maintain training levels of Army National Guard units.

==== Main battle tank designation ====
The concept of the medium tank gradually evolved into the main battle tank (MBT) in the 1960s. The MBT was to combine the firepower and protection sufficient for the assault role with the mobility to perform as a medium tank. The MBT thus took on the role the British had once called the "universal tank" in the late 1950s, exemplified by the British Centurion, filling almost all battlefield roles. Typical MBTs were as well armed as any other vehicle on the battlefield, highly mobile, and well armored. Yet they were cheap enough to be built in large numbers.

The first generation consists of the medium tanks designed and produced directly after World War II that were later redefined as main battle tanks. These were exemplified by the M47 and M48 Pattons armed with a 90 mm main gun already in widespread US service. The original variant of the M60 series also fulfilled the definition of a late first generation MBT sometimes being referred to as an intermediate second generation design. The Soviet T-54 and T-55 as well as the original configuration of the T-62A tank designs are also regarded as first generation MBTs.

The second generation had enhanced night-fighting capabilities and in most cases nuclear, biological and chemical (NBC) protection. Most western tanks of this generation were armed with the 105 mm Royal Ordnance L7 tank gun or derivatives of it. Notable are the 120-mm armed British Chieftain and German Leopard 1. The United States fully committed to the MBT doctrine in 1963 when the Marine Corps deactivated its last M103 heavy tank battalion.

The first American nomenclature-designated second generation MBT was the M60A1 version of the M60 series. The term MBT is used in strategic doctrine and the composition of force as determined by the United States Army. The M60 series tanks fulfilled the MBT role on a strategic and tactical level. It was never referred to as such in any official training or technical manuals. The first Soviet second generation main battle tank designs were the T-64 and T-72.

== Production versions ==
=== XM60 development ===
By May 1957, it became clear that the T95 Medium Tank would not have a significant advantage over the M48A2. The X-shaped motor and electro-optical rangefinder were both discarded due to performance, and the accuracy of the smoothbore gun and its high velocity APDS ammunition continued to be unsatisfactory. The T95E6 turret was to be made with the advanced silicas armor but was never constructed. All this led to the closure of the T95 project on July 7, 1960. But the T95E7 turret design using conventional hardened steel armor was carried forward, becoming the M60A1's turret.

The course of the M48 Patton's tank production was the source of widespread Congressional debate. The Bureau of the Budget believed that the Army was not progressing with sufficient speed in its tank modernization program and recommended the immediate replacement of the M48A2. Correctly predicting that Congress would not approve the procurement of the M48A2 after the fiscal year 1959, the Deputy Chief of Staff, Logistics (DCSLOG) proposed a tank based on the M48A2 featuring improved firepower and the AVDS-1790 engine. Since the main gun had not yet been specified, four XM60 weapons systems were submitted in September 1957.

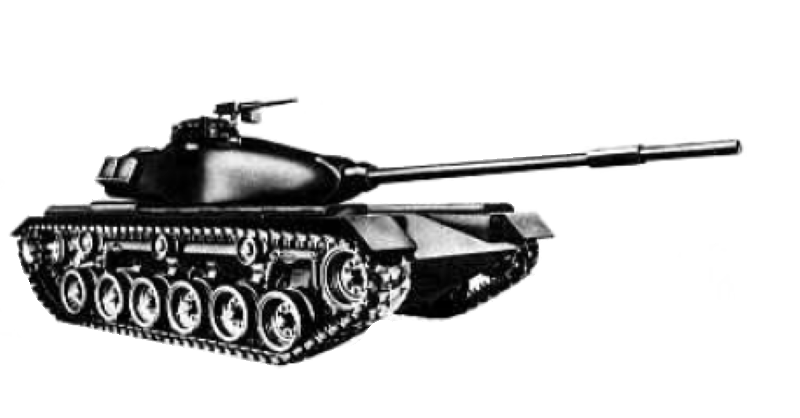
A concept design #1 of the XM60 mounting the T123E6 main gun and British styled gun barrel, the newly designed full-vision cupola using the T95E6 turret as preferred by the Ordnance Department

The first concept was armed with the 120mm gun T123E6 in the long nosed T95E6 turret. This was the design preferred by the Ordnance Department. It was fitted with a mock-up of the new designed full-vision commander's cupola. A full sized prototype of this turret was constructed before this concept was dropped, mainly due to its slow rate of fire. The second carried the 105mm rifled T254E1 main gun in the T95E5 type turret and the T9 cupola style of the M48A2. The T254 guns used British X15/L52 barrels with a concentric bore evacuator on the barrel.

The Army Ordnance Technical Committee chose this design for production in August 1958. The third concept was to mount the 90mm T208 smooth-bore main gun and the T95E6 turret with the T6 cupola of the T95 tank. It never progressed beyond design drawings. The fourth used the T95E1 turret and the T208 main gun. A mock-up was built using the new vision cupola. All of these conceptual designs were referred to as the XM60. A contract was awarded to Chrysler Engineering in September 1958 for the advanced production engineering (APE) of the XM60 concept #2.

The T95 hull was considered however its one-piece front casting was too difficult and expensive to produce in quantity. Some existing T95 hulls were re-fitted with the AVDS-1790 engine and used from 1960 to 1964 to develop the T118E1 prototyping of the M728 Combat Engineer Vehicle. Instead the decision was made to use modified M48A2 hulls. The hulls had 3 return rollers and 6 steel roadwheel pairs per side with no shock absorbers, using only bumper springs on the first and sixth roadwheel arms along with a widened turret well and ring, and a flat wedge-shaped glacis. The T254E2 gun was chosen to be the main weapon of the tank in August 1958 being standardized as the M68 105mm gun. After a briefing on 11 December 1958, General Maxwell Taylor ordered the XM60 into production because of the improvements it offered in firepower, protection, and cruising range.

Since the tank had not yet received its official designation these prototype hulls were briefly referred to as the M68 in December 1958 until they were officially named the M60 in March 1959. Fulfilling this requirement was an interim tank design that resulted in the M60-series, which largely resembles the M48A2 Patton it was based on, but has significant differences. The visual similarity of these designs as well as their overlapping period of service has caused some sources to informally name the original variant of the M60 as a Patton tank.

=== M60 series ===
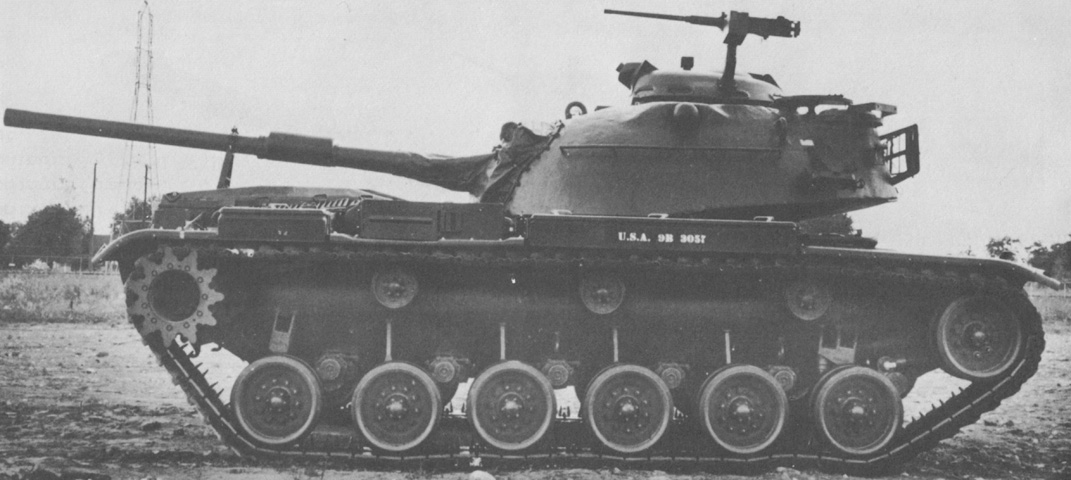
M60 production pilot number 1 after completion by Chrysler on 2 July 1959. Note the use of a pedestal mounted M2HB machine gun on the cupola. The turret is traversed to the rear of the tank.

The OTCM (Ordnance Technical Committee Minutes) #37002 officially standardized the type as the Tank, Combat, Full Tracked: 105-mm Gun, M60 on 16 March 1959. The production contract was approved April 1959 with the low rate initial production starting in June at the Chrysler Corporation Delaware Defense Plant in Newark Delaware. Production pilot 1 was completed at Chrysler Defense Engineering on 2 July with an initial production total of 45 tanks in July 1959. These tanks were sent to the Aberdeen Proving Ground for survivability testing and final design modifications. This batch of tanks did not have the M19 cupola due to its initial production problems.

Production pilot 2 was finished on 4 August and used to develop technical publications and an additional 47 tanks produced to complete the first low rate production buy. In August 1959, an engineering bid package was awarded for the second low rate production buy of M60s to be built at the Delaware Plant. Production pilot 3 was completed 2 September. These tanks went to the Detroit Arsenal Test Center for maintenance evaluations, they were then sent to Fort Knox for user trials.

The fourth pilot was completed on 26 October and was used as the master hull to verify production standards at the Detroit Tank Plant with a low-rate initial production total of 180 M60s built in 1959. Subsequent production, starting with the October 1960 batch were built at the Detroit Arsenal Tank Plant, in Warren Michigan. It reached operational capability with fielding to Army units in Europe beginning in December 1960.

Features

The original variant of the M60 series ultimately was produced as a quick fix engineering (QFE) upgrade of the M48 due to the Soviet Union's tank advancements of the late 1950s and the delays from developing the silicas armor and an improved turret design. The M60 mounted a 105 mm M68 main gun with the bore evacuator mounted towards the middle of the tube carrying 57 rounds in the clamshell shaped turret style of the M48. Nine rounds were stowed in the left side of the turret bustle behind the loader.

The remaining rounds were stored inside safe containers on the hull floor. A new short receiver coaxial machine gun was designed for the M60 tank. This was the 7.62mm M73/T197E2 which replaced the .30 caliber M37 used on the M48A2. It had 2,000 rounds of ammunition. They had a reputation for jamming. After working to correct this, they were redesignated as the M73A1 in 1970.

The electrical package on the M60 was essentially the same as used on the M48A2C including an improved turret control system and an all-metric measurement M16 Fire Control System (FCS), The M16 FCS consists of a new M10 ballistic drive and mechanical M16E1 gun data computer which integrated barrel temperature data with an M17 coincidence range finder used as the ranging device of the gunner's primary direct sighting and fire control system. The gunner is provided with an M31E1 day periscope with a magnification of x8 and an M105D day telescopic sight with a magnification of x8 and a field of view of 7.5 degrees.

Range information from the rangefinder is fed into the ballistic computer through a shaft. The ballistic computer is a mechanically driven unit that permits ammunition selection, range correction, and superelevation correction by the gunner. The ballistic drive receives the range input and, through the use of cams and gears, provides superelevation information to the superelevation actuator. The superelevation actuator adds sufficient hydraulic fluid to the elevating mechanism to correctly position the gun.

In late 1962, a kit was fielded that allowed the use of the AN/VSS-1(V)1 IR searchlight. The searchlight has both infrared and visible light capabilities and was positioned over the gun. Along with an M32 IR periscope for the gunner, M19 IR periscope and M18 IR binoculars for the commander provided first generation night vision capability to the M60 and M60A1 tanks. This kit was also compatible with the M48A3/A5.

The hull bottom had a strong boat-like appearance with a pronounced recess between the upper tracks and external suspension arms with cast aluminum roadwheels and return rollers along with a single shock absorber on the first roadwheel pair. Cast aluminum road wheels were used to save weight. The armor was improved, at 6 inches (155 mm) on the front glacis and mantle of solid rolled homogeneous armor, while it was 4.3 inches (110 mm) on the M48. Power was provided by the AVDS-1790-2A engine, CD-850-5 cross drive transmission and the T97E2 track assembly as used on the M48A3.

The drive sprocket is located at the rear of the hull. The vehicle also provides full NBC protection for the crew using the M13A1 protection system creating a positive atmospheric pressure in the crew compartment. The positive pressure keeps contaminated air out and forces the smoke produced from firing the main or coax guns out of the vehicle. Access between the driver's compartment and the turret fighting compartment was also restricted, requiring that the turret be traversed to the rear.

The M60 was deployed to West Germany to counter the threat presented from the T-54s and T-55s of the Soviet Union and Warsaw Pact as well as to South Korea but was never sent to South Vietnam mainly due to unfavorable terrain and the general lack of significant numbers of North Vietnamese armor. In May 1961 Army Chief-of-Staff General George Decker announced that the European Command had been receiving the M60 to replace older tank inventory. By October the Seventh Army was outfitted with many of the tanks. A total of 2,205 M60s were built between June 1959 and August 1962. Some M60/E60 tanks were later transferred to Israel and participated in the Yom Kippur War. Some were repurposed as AVLBs.

=== M60A1 series ===
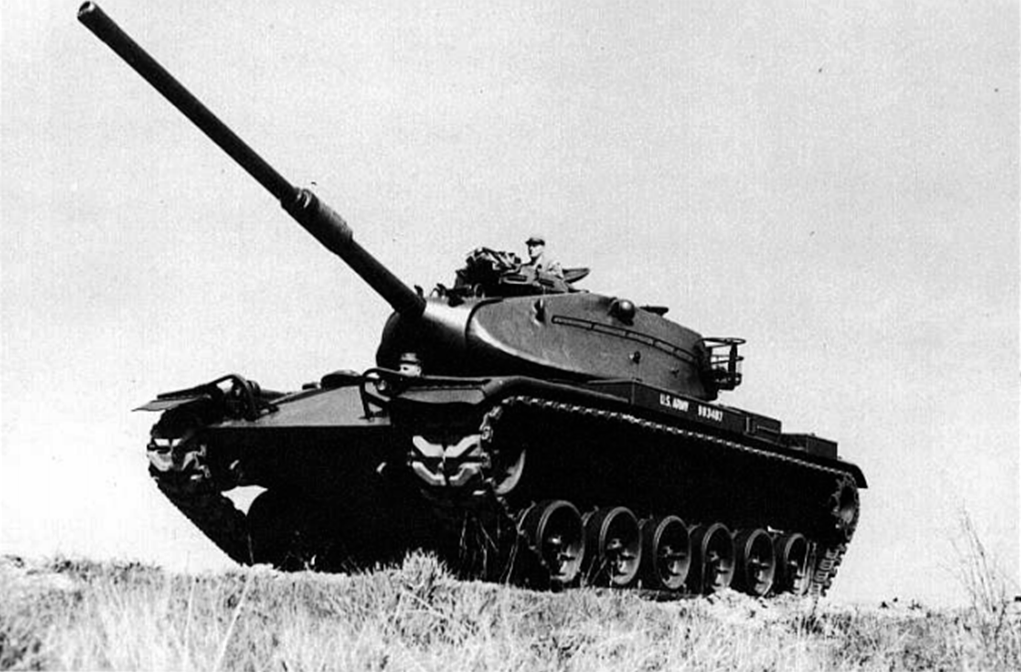
M60E1 pilot number 1 during preliminary tests at the Detroit Arsenal Test Center 19 May 1961. The machine guns are not installed.

1966 documentary about the development of the M60 tank

Development

The program to develop the M60A1 was approved in early 1960 in conjunction with abandoning further development of the advanced composite armor and the closure of the T95 Medium Tank project. The first proof of concept attempt to mate a modified M60 hull with the T95E7 turret took place in March 1960. The turret, even without the siliceous cored armor, provided improved ballistic protection. Additional space for the turret crew was also made available by using the M140 mount thus moving the cannon 5 inches forward.

The first two prototypes (Pilot 1 and 2) were ready in May 1961 and the third (Pilot 3) in June 1961, when the vehicle also received its official prototype designation as the M60E1. These vehicles were built by Chrysler Defense. Pilot 1 was sent for evaluation at the Eglin Air Force Base climatic hangar, while Pilot 2 was tested at the Yuma Test Station, and Pilot 3 underwent field trials at Fort Knox.

On 22 October 1961, the M60E1 was officially accepted in service under the designation of Tank, Combat, Full Tracked: 105-mm Gun, M60A1. Production began on 13 October 1962 when the Army placed an initial order for 720 of the tanks for 61.2 million dollars.

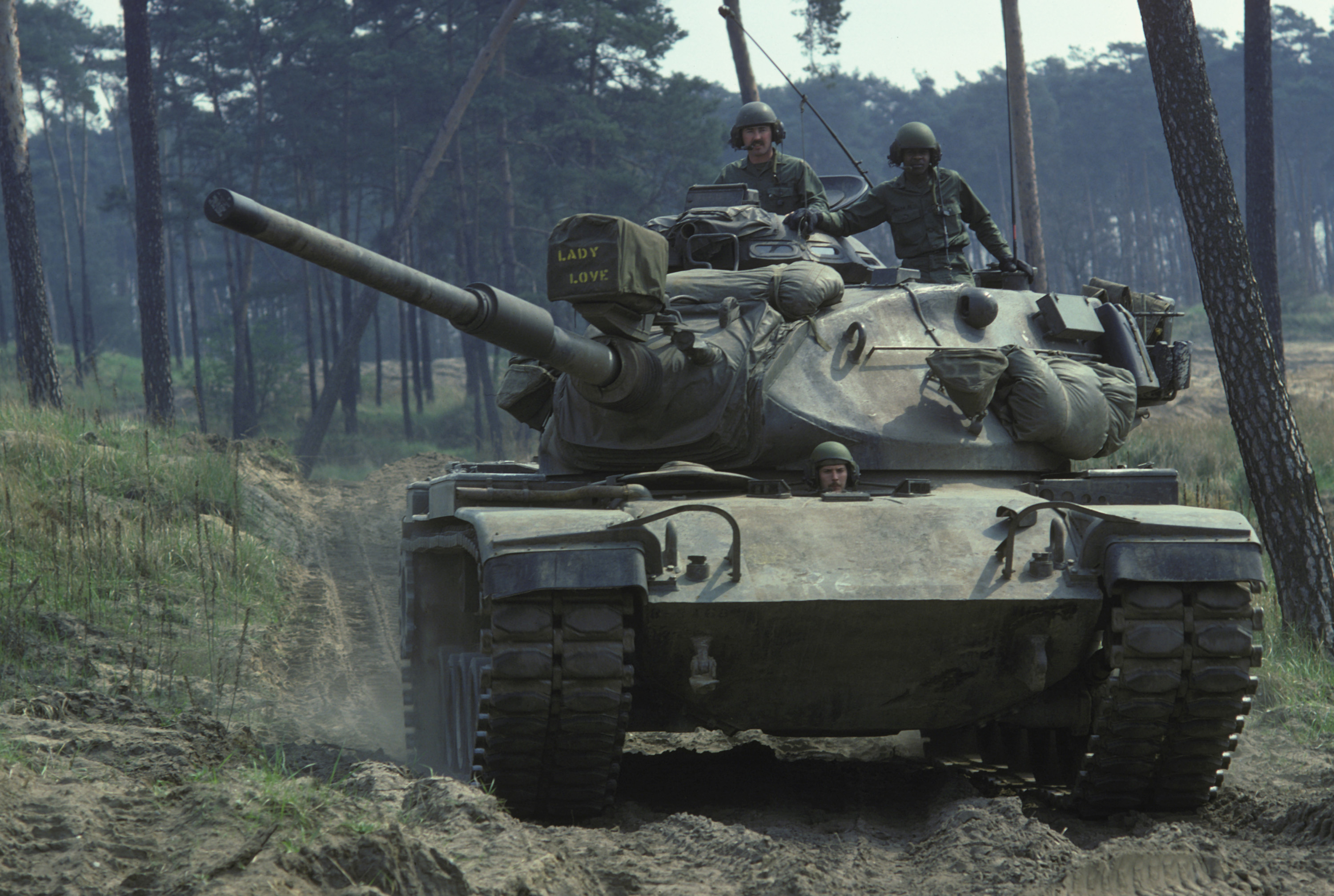
A M60A1 tank during field training in 1975. Note the more elongated shape of the new turret used on this variant.

Features

In addition to the new turret design, the hull was upgraded. The hull's upper glacis armor was increased from 3.67 to 4.29 in (93 to 109 mm) at 65 degrees while the turret sides went from 1.9 to 2.9 in (48 to 74 mm) at their apex. This brought the frontal armor up to the same 10" line of sight armor standard of the M103 heavy tank. A mushroom-shaped fume extractor was placed at the rear left of the turret bustle to vent smoke produced from firing the main or coax guns out of the vehicle. The addition of a shock absorber on the second roadwheel pair was also accompanied by a slight relocation of the first return roller. These modifications were needed due to the increased weight of the M60A1 turret as well as the additional hull armor.

The ammunition load for the main gun was increased to 63 rounds. Round storage was distributed between the turret bustle, where 15 ready rounds of various types were stowed and accessible for the loader, and the rest were stored inside safe containers on the hull floor.

The uncomfortable wire mesh seats for the loader and gunner were replaced with padded ones. The brake and accelerator pedal and gauges were also rearranged for more efficient and comfortable operation while the steering wheel was replaced by a T bar steering control. The engine and power train were supplied by the Continental AVDS-1790-2A engine and the CD-850-5 cross drive transmission and using the T97 track assembly.

Improvements to the electronics package for this version included an improved electro-mechanical traverse assembly and an AN/VSS-1(V)1 IR searchlight above the gun shield. The M19 FCS consisted of the M17A1 coincidence rangefinder, M10A1 ballistic drive and the mechanical M19E1 ballistic computer for the gunner. The M60A1 RISE Passive tank uses the M68E1 variant of the gun carried in the M140 mount. Most M60A1 RISE tanks were retrofitted to this standard after 1977. The M68E1 gun shares the same firing characteristics as the M68. It featured several design improvements including an updated gun hydraulic configuration, a stabilization upgrade for the gun, a gun elevation kill switch for the loader, improved ballistic drive and other component refinements.

Upgrades

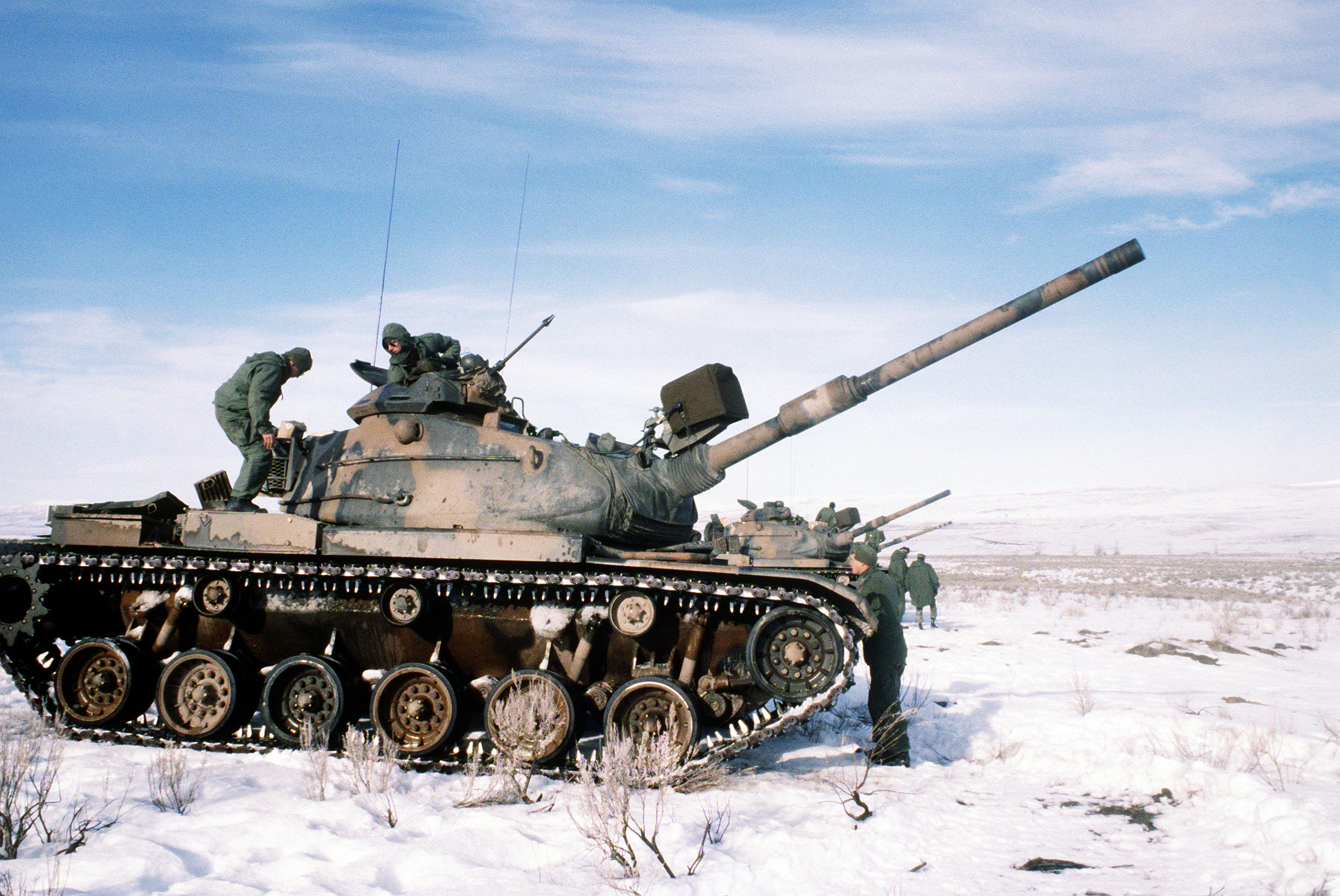
USMC M60A1 vehicles lined up during cold weather training

As the development of a new main battle tank stalled with problems and cost escalating quickly, the M60A1 was forced to serve longer than originally intended with production lasting almost 20 years. In that time span, numerous product improvement programs were put forward. As the major changes were incorporated into the production line, the vehicle model designations were changed. The first of which was Top Loading Air Cleaner (TLAC) in 1971. This reduced dirt and dust ingestion, which increased engine life as well as allowing for easier servicing of the engine. Early TLAC panels were made from aluminum and were vulnerable to damage from small arms fire.

Next came Add-On Stabilization (AOS) that was introduced in late 1972. This was an add-on kit made to fit with minimum modifications to the existing hydraulic gun control system. The add-on-stabilization system provides stabilization control for both gun elevation and turret traverse. It provides the gunner with the capability of aiming and target tracking and also improved surveillance of the battlefield terrain by the gunner while the tank is moving. It may be used in any one of three modes of control: (1) power-with-stabilization-on, (2) power-with-stabilization-off, and (3) manual. In the power-with-stabilization-on mode, the gunner's aim on target is automatically retained while the vehicle is in motion. This mode provides a fire-on the-move capability. The power-with-stabilization-off option eliminates needless exercise of the stabilization system and provides a backup power mode. The manual back up system permits the crew to aim and fire the weapons should the electrical/hydraulic subsystems fail.

At a range of 2,000 m (6,600 ft), hit probabilities of better than 70% from a moving M60A1 were obtained in Aberdeen test results while without a stabilizer it was essentially zero. M60A1s with this upgrade were designated as the M60A1(AOS). The T142 track was fielded in 1974, which had replaceable rubber pads, better end connectors, and improved service life. M60A1(AOS)+ was the denotation for M60A1s equipped with the TLAC & AOS upgrades and the T142 track.

Introduced in 1975, the Reliability Improved Selected Equipment (RISE) was a comprehensive upgrade of the M60A1 hull as well as integrating the previous TLAC and AOS upgrades. It included the upgraded AVDS-1790-2C RISE diesel engine and CD-850-6 transmission that featured several changes in order to improve service life and reliability. A new 650 ampere oil-cooled alternator, a solid state regulator and new wiring harness with more accessible disconnectors was also incorporated into the hull's electrical system as well as armored steel TLAC panels and the return to the use of steel roadwheels and return rollers. They were denoted as M60A1(RISE).

The 1977 fielding of the passive M32E1 sight for the gunner and M36E1 periscope for the commander as well as the M24E1 IR night vision block for the driver provided second generation night vision capabilities for M60A1 and RISE tanks. These new passive gunner's sight and commander's periscope provide recognition capability at longer ranges and at relatively low night light levels (1/2 moonlight). Under starlight conditions, they will provide recognition beyond 500 m (1,600 ft) with the use of an IR searchlight.

During 1978, kits for the mounting of the M239 smoke grenade launchers and the mounting of the M240 as the coaxial machine gun were fielded. The development of the M735 APFSDS ammunition required a cam update to the gun's mechanical ballistic drive for accurate firing. M60A1s configured to this standard were denoted as M60A1(RISE)+.

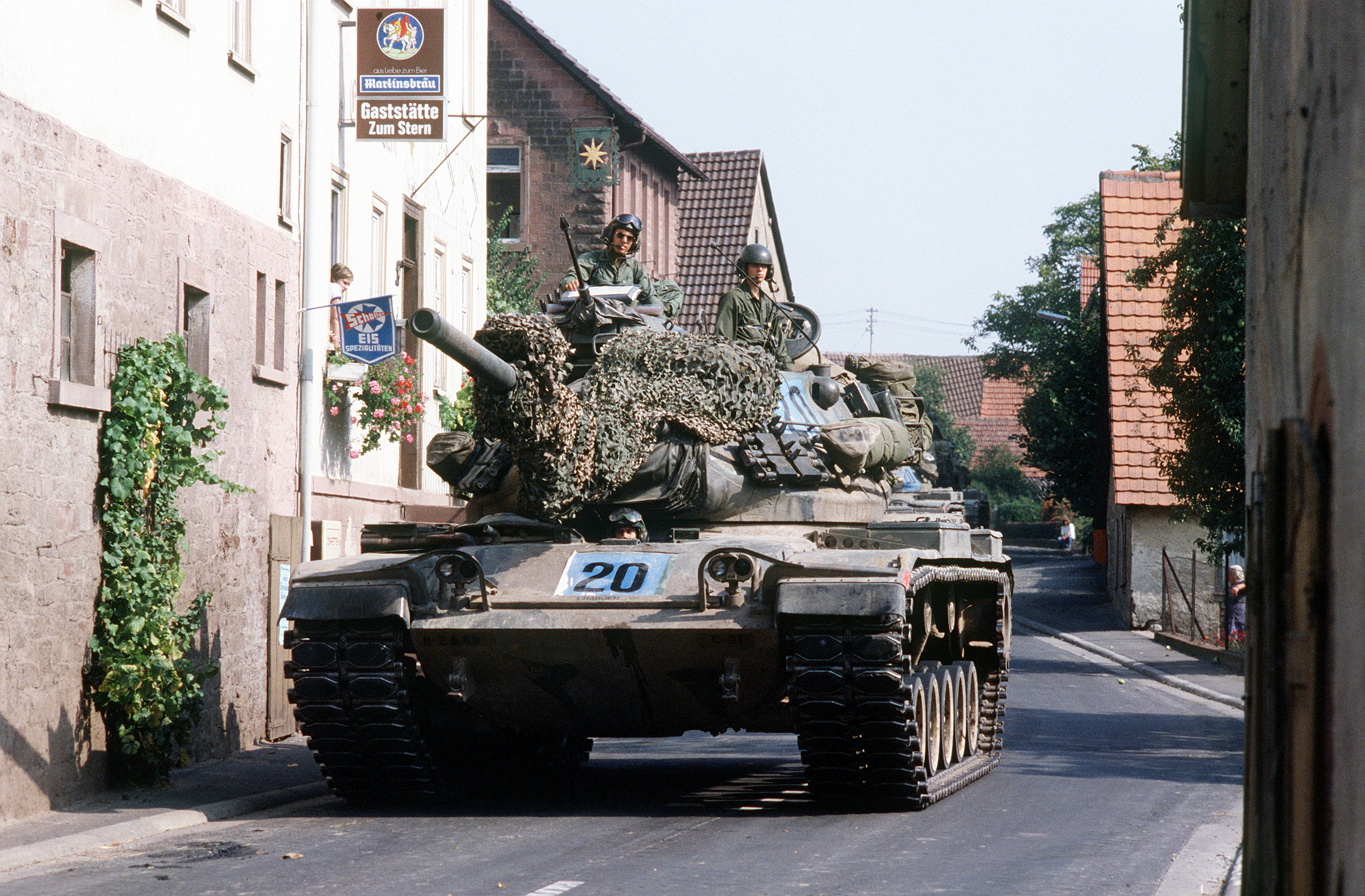
A US Army M60A1 RISE Passive tank maneuvers through a narrow German village street while participating in REFORGER 1982

The M60A1(RISE) Passive featured the implementation of all previous updates plus AN/VVS-2 passive night vision block for the driver, a deep water fording kit, the capability to mount Explosive Reactive Armor (ERA) and the AVDS-1790-2D RISE engine with CD-850-6A transmission and a Vehicle Engine Exhaust Smoke System (VEESS) that visually obscured the area around the vehicle. The VEESS smokescreen system does not provide protection against infrared, thermal or laser detection.

The two six-barreled, electronically fired M239 smoke grenade launchers, one on each side of the main gun and replacement of the coax machine gun with the M240C were implemented in late 1978. The smoke grenades contain a phosphor compound that masks the thermal signature of the vehicle to the enemy. They were denoted as M60A1(RISE) Passive.

Over the period of M60A1 tank production, several essential engineering changes were incorporated. Many of these miscellaneous changes were to improve the system safety, reliability, maintainability and increase mission performance. The M60A1 Tank Hull/Turret Product Improvement Plan (PIP) Update Kit includes those items that could not be readily identified with basic major product improvements and to incorporate essential engineering changes that had occurred during M60A1 tank production. The update program included engineering changes and minor product improvements which were not part of specific product improvements, but were required to upgrade early vintage M60A1 tanks up to the current M60A1(RISE) production configuration. Additionally the Hull PIP Update Kit was applied to the M48A5.

The M60A1 was in production from October 1962 until May 1980 and was extensively used by the US Army and Marine Corps as well as being widely exported to foreign governments. A total of 7,948 M60A1s (all variants including E60A) were built. Many of them were later converted to the A3 standard.

=== M60A2 series ===
During the early 1960s there was some debate regarding the future of main tank weaponry, largely focusing on conventional kinetic energy rounds versus missiles. In the early 1960s it was generally accepted that the maximum effective range of the M68 gun was between 1,800 and 2,000 m (5,900 and 6,600 ft). The XM-13 missile system had proven itself viable, obtaining over 90% first round accuracy up to 4,000 m (13,000 ft). But the development of a main battle tank variant was bogged down by having too many design proposals. In response, studies were made in August 1961 to retrofit existing M60 tanks with a weapon capable of firing both conventional HEAT (High-Explosive Anti-Tank) rounds and launching ATGMs (Anti-Tank Guided-Missiles).

Three M60E1 tanks with T95 turrets were modified to permit the installation of the 152mm XM81 gun-launcher. Mounted on former M60 hulls, they were to provide test beds for the evaluation of the Shillelagh weapon system. Although this system was the preferred armament for the MBT-70, by late 1961 problems with the XM13 missile required that the program be reorganized. The missile was reclassified as an applied research project and it was obvious that there would be some delay before it would be available for service.

On 10 January 1962, representatives from various ordnance organizations met at the Ordnance Tank-Automotive Center (OTAC) to review armament systems that might be suitable replacements, if the Shillelagh missile could not be developed in a timely manner. Time was particularly critical for the Armored Reconnaissance/Airborne Assault Vehicle (AR/AAV) (the XM551 Sheridan), which required a decision on the armament by April 1962. The possible delay was not as serious for the MBT-70 since the program was limited to conceptual design and component development. The requirements also differed for the tank because of its ability to carry a much heavier weapon system.

Several backup weapons were also under consideration and concept studies were prepared showing their application to the MBT-70 concepts. The 152mm gun-launcher XM81 also was considered without the missile depending only on the combustible case conventional ammunition. It was expected that the Shillelagh or some other missile then could be introduced at a later date.

The 105mm gun M68 as standardized for the M60 tank was considered as an alternate armament system. It had the advantage of being immediately available and its ammunition was already in production. Of the several turrets drafted, one of the earliest was the driver-in-turret integrated fighting compartment. This design was further developed using the MBT-70. Another proposal was a more compact turret design of the T95E7.

Development

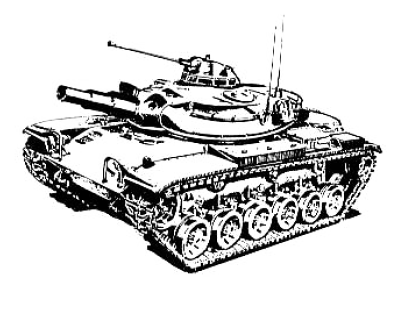
A conceptual drawing of the XM66 with a Type C turret

During the development of the M60A2, three different turret types were considered, the Type A, Type B and Type C. The Type A turret would be constructed based on the T95E7 turret and then further modified and produced as the Type B standard. The Type C turret was essentially a larger M551 Sheridan-style turret. A mock-up of this turret was built, but the design was never seriously considered and soon abandoned. All of these conceptual variants were referred to as the XM66.

On 10 January 1964, the Army reviewed all three variants and selected the Type A variant for further development. Initially two Type A turrets were built in 1964. The M60A1 hull was used starting in 1966 to develop the new compact turret design using the 152mm M162/XM81E13 rifled barrel main gun. These developmental tanks were designated as the M60A1E series.

The M60A1E1 referred to vehicles based on the modified T95E7 Type A turrets with M60 hulls used through 1965. The M60A1E1 variant was used to evaluate the XM81 dual-purpose gun and its compatibility with the XM13 Guided Missile, Armor Defeating together with the XMTM51 training round. During the early testing of the XM81 main gun it was noted that misfires and premature detonations of the M409 conventional case ammunition were caused by unburnt propellant in the bore and breech.

This flaw was often catastrophic as it set off the projectile in the barrel as it was fired. To remedy this the guns were equipped with a traditional fume extractor on the barrel. The XM81 Gun/Launcher also experienced frequent faulty breeches, often not closing correctly during a missile firing, allowing the exhaust of the launching Shillelagh to vent hot noxious gases into the crew compartment.

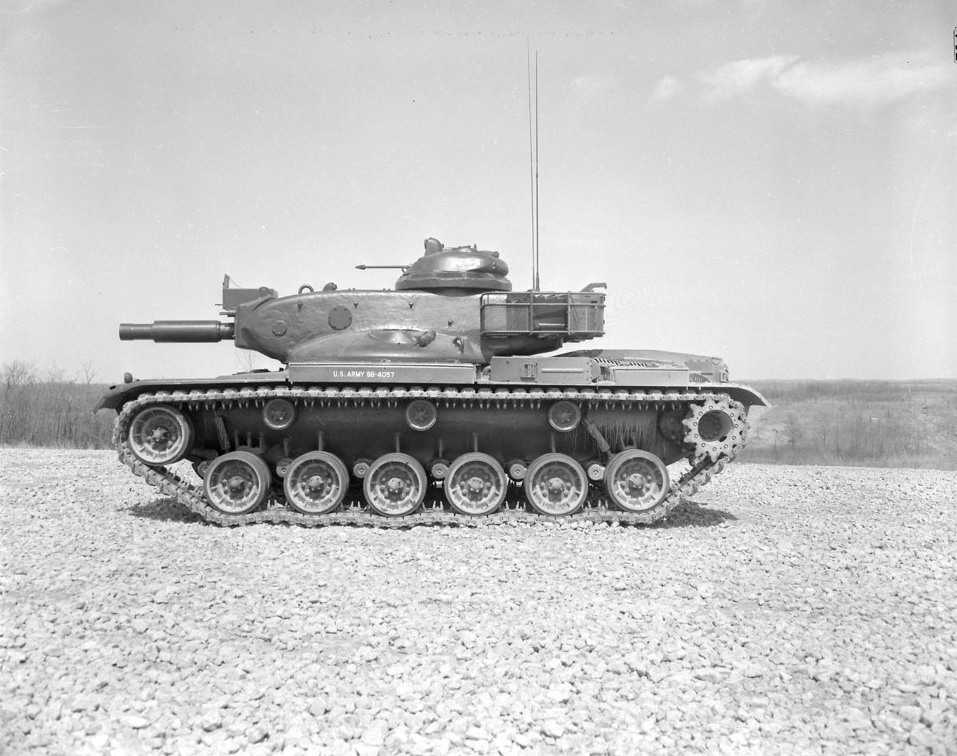
A M60A1E2 tank prototype with a Type B turret

As the M60A1 hull became available in 1966, it was decided to upgrade these prototype vehicles to the M60A1 hull standard. Vehicles using the M60A1 hull and chassis received the M60A1E2 designation, and were used to develop the Type B compact turret and the XM81E13 gun variant. The M60A1E2 finalized the turret design with the use of a compact turret which reduced exposed frontal area by 40% compared to the M60A1 and continued development of the M51 Missile Guidance System (M51MGS).

These were later standardized as the M60A2. Initial plans called to retrofit the turret of every M60 with the new A2 turret, and use them in the mobile anti-armor role alongside the M60A1 tanks. But the continual technical and reliability difficulties with the dual-purpose gun caused this to be abandoned. The M60A1E3 variant was a prototype mounting the M68 105 mm rifled gun to the turret of the M60A1E2. This was evaluated due to several earlier faults noted in the M60A1E1's main gun. Compared to the Shillelagh system, the use of the 105mm gun increased the overall tank weight by about 1,700 pounds (770 kg).

The M60A1E4 was a conceptual variant that explored the use of various remote controlled weapons, including a 20mm gun as secondary armament. A mock-up of this design using the Type C turret was constructed. All variants of this series underwent evaluations and trials at the Aberdeen Proving Ground. The M60A1E2 was finally accepted by the Army in 1970 and given the designation "Tank, Combat, Full Tracked: 152-mm Gun/Launcher, M60A2".

Initial orders were submitted by the Army in 1971 however production did not start until 1973 and continued until 1975. All were built at the Chrysler Tank Plant in Warren, Michigan with a total of 540 M60A2s produced. The M60A2 was intended to serve as the stop-gap solution until its projected replacement, the MBT-70 completed its development. The M60A2 was deployed to Army units in Europe starting in June 1975 when B Company, 1-32 Armor Battalion received its first M60A2 tanks.

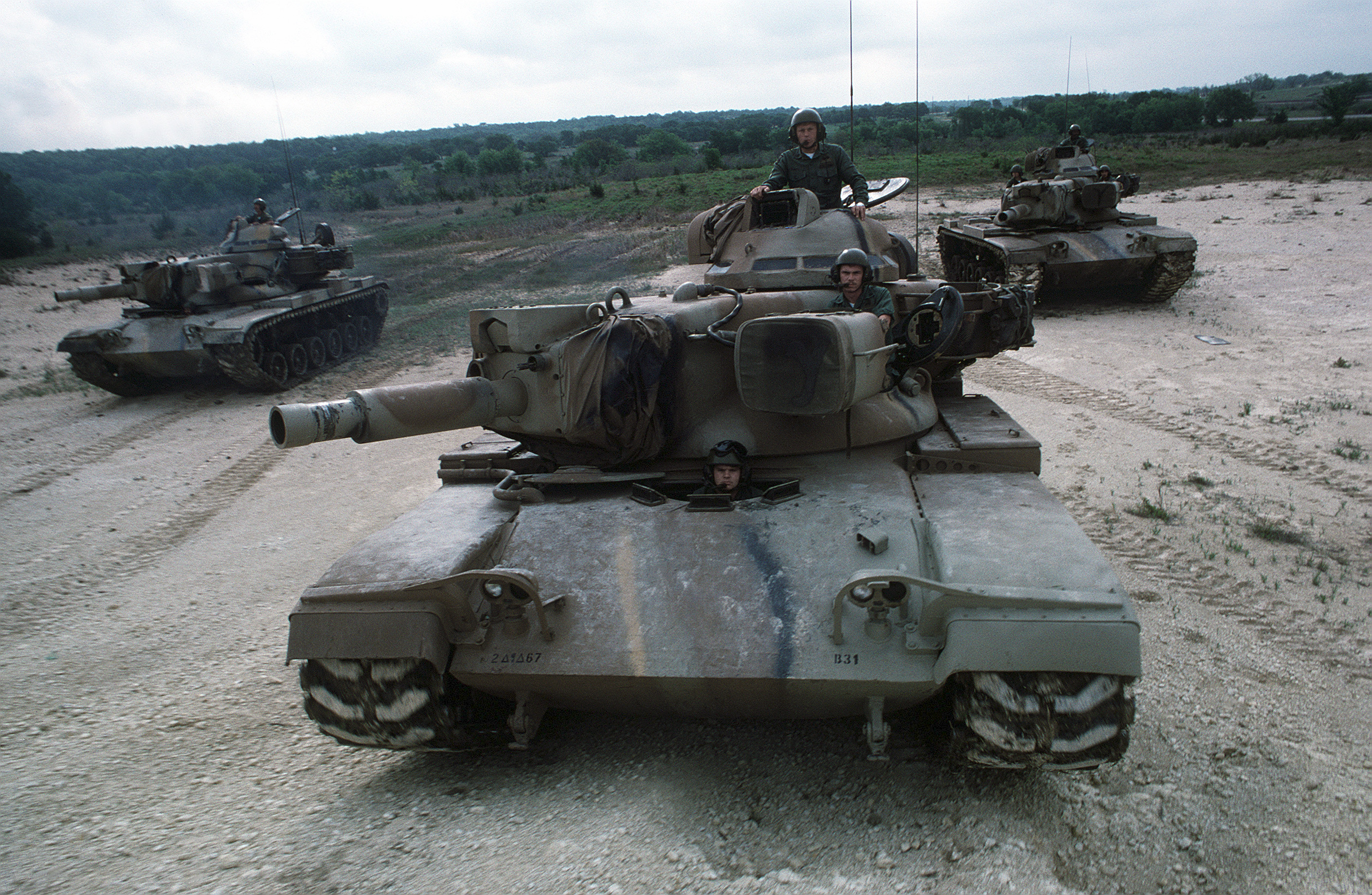
The M60A2 in service in 1975

Features

The M60A2 featured a unique low profile turret, mounting the M162 Gun/Launcher that drastically reduced the turret's frontal arc in comparison to the A1's. It consisted of a large disk with a narrow channel in the center with each crew member in the turret having their own hatch. The gunner and loader were located to the right and left of the gun, respectively, and the commander was in a turret basket up and behind the main gun.

As a result, each crew member was effectively isolated from one another with the gunner and loader separated by Shillelagh missiles in their storage position. The commander was in the rear compartment under a large redesigned cupola, which somewhat negated the low profile silhouette of the turret.

The M162 gun was fully stabilized in both turret traverse and gun elevation using the same upgrade kit as the M60A1 AOS, allowing the gunner to effectively scan the battlefield while the tank was in motion. This system could be used by the gunner to engage targets with unguided M409 rounds while the vehicle was in motion, but the tank had to remain stationary when firing and tracking an MGM-51 missile. Four M226 smoke grenade launchers were mounted on each side of the turret bustle.

Additionally there was a mounting point on the left side of the turret for an AN/VSS-1(V)1 Infrared Spotlight and M19E1 IR periscope providing first generation night vision for night operations. A basket was fitted to the rear of the turret to stow the spotlight when not in use. Late production versions replaced the bore evacuator with the Closed-Bore Scavenger System (CBSS), a compressed air system that pushed the fumes and gases out of the muzzle when the breech was opened.

Initial production M60A2s used the M60A1 hull powered by an AVDS-1790-2A TLAC engine, CD-850-5 cross-drive transmission and the T97 track assembly. Many of these hulls were later upgraded to the RISE standard.

The M51 Missile Guidance System (MGS) for the Shillelagh missiles was designed by Ford's Aerospace Division. The M51 MGS consisted of an infrared (IR) direct beam guidance and control system to track the missile mounted to the turret over the mantel of the gun with a telescopic sight and a Raytheon AN/WG-1 Flashlamp Pumped, Ruby Laser range finder, accurate to 4,000 meters, for the gunner.

The gunner aimed the cross-hairs in his direct telescopic sight at the target and fired the missile. After acquiring a target a small charge would propel the missile out of the barrel. The missile's solid-fueled sustainer rocket then ignited and launched the Shillelagh. For the time of flight of the missile, the gunner had to keep the cross-hairs pointed at the target. A direct infrared beam missile tracker in the gunner's sight detected any deviation of the flight path from the line-of-sight to the target, and transmitted corrective commands to the missile via an infrared command link. The MGM-51A was stabilized by flip-out fins, and controlled by hot gas jet reaction controls.

The gunner also employed an M219 (later replaced with a M240C) to the gun mantle's right with 2,000 rounds. The commanders cupola was redesigned causing the M85 to be mounted in the inverted position in order to provide access to its feed cover and mounted a single M34 periscope carrying 600 rounds. The M60A2's combat load for the M162 main gun consisted of 33 M409 rounds and 13 MGM-51 Shillelagh missiles.

Flaws

This weapon system had several drawbacks. First, the gunner had to keep the target in the crosshairs of the sight during the entire flight time of the missile. This meant that only one target could be tracked and engaged at a time. Furthermore, the M60A2 could not fire or track a missile while moving.

Secondly was the high minimum range of about 730 m (2,400 ft). Until the missile reached this range it flew beneath the tracking system's infrared beam and could therefore not be guided by the infrared command link. Also, minimum range was slightly above the maximum effective range of the M60A2's conventional unguided munition. This created a dangerous gap area that could not be adequately covered by fire known as a "dead zone".

It was also discovered that structural cracks in the barrel occurred after several missile firings. This defect was traced to a flaw in the missile's longitudinal key, which fitted into a keyway inside the gun barrel. It was determined that a less deep key would significantly extend the service life of the barrel.

The Missile Control System was also very fragile owing to its dependence on vacuum tubes which often broke when firing the gun. Finally, a Shillelagh missile was considerably more expensive than the M409 round. The vehicle was one of the most technologically complex of its era, eventually garnering an unofficial nickname of "Starship". This also contributed to its failure, largely due to difficulties with maintenance, training, and complicated operation.

The M60A2 proved a disappointment, though its technical advancements would pave the way for future tanks. Its intended successor, the MBT-70, was canceled in 1971 and its funding diverted into the conceptual development of the XM1 Abrams. The Shillelagh/M60A2 system was phased out from active units by 1981, and the turrets scrapped. The main replacement for the Shillelagh missile in the mobile anti-armor role was the more versatile BGM-71 TOW. Most of the M60A2 tanks were rebuilt as M60A3s, or the hulls converted to armored vehicle-launched bridge (AVLB) vehicles and M728 Combat Engineer Vehicles with a few M60A2s retained as museum pieces.

=== M60A3 series ===
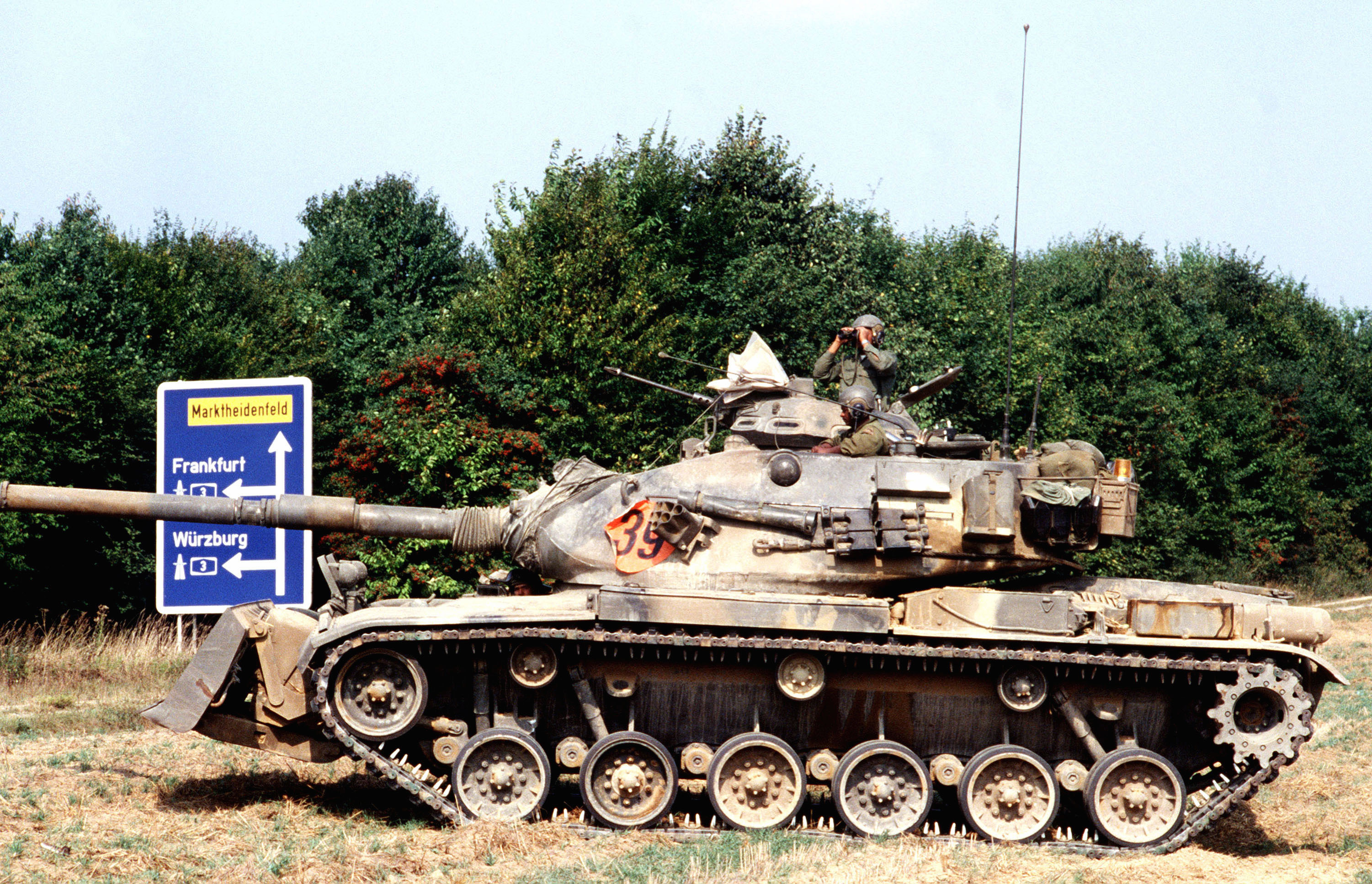
A US M60A3 deployed for Reforger 82 in West Germany; a sensor mast of the new M21 fire control system located on the rear of the turret roof is one of the distinguishing features of this variant from prior models.

Development

Due to the rapidly developing advancements in anti-armor capabilities and solid-state electronics of the 1970s, along with the general dissatisfaction of the M60A2, an upgrade of the M60A1 was needed. In 1976 work began on the M60A3 variant which featured a number of technological enhancements.

Features

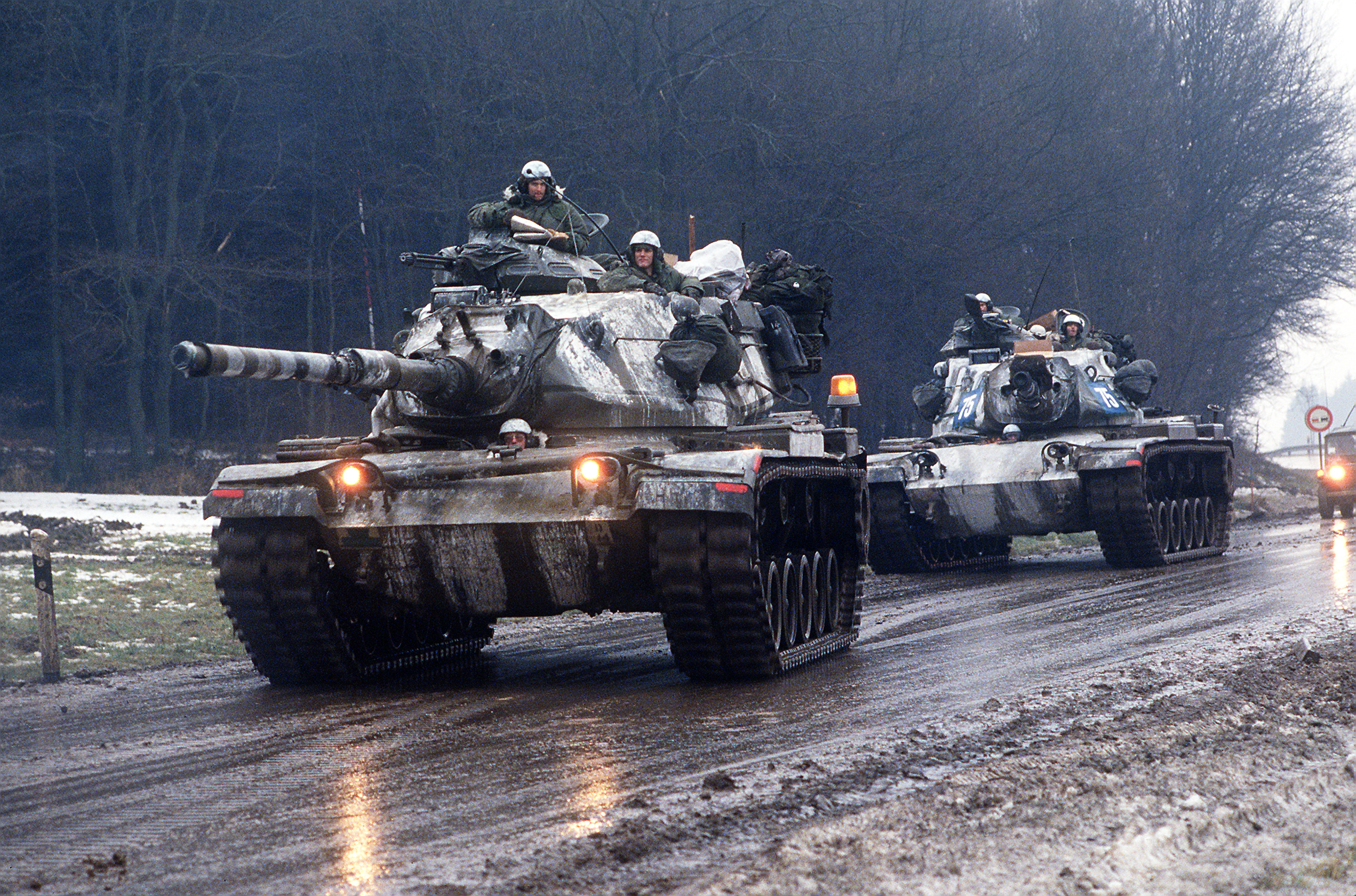
Two M60A3 TTSs of the US Army near Giessen, West Germany in 1985

The M60A3 version of the M60-series had the same mobility, performance, and weapons systems as the M60A1 RISE and RISE Passive tanks and incorporated all of their engineering upgrades, improvements and capabilities.

The electronics and fire control systems were greatly improved. The turret's hydraulic fluid was replaced with a non-flammable one. This updated turret configuration was mated to the M60A1 RISE hull using the AVDS-1790-2D RISE engine and CD-850-6A transmission along with a Halon fire suppression system. It was designated as the Tank, Combat, Full Tracked: 105-mm Gun, M60A3.

The M60A3 tank was built in two configurations. The earlier version, sometimes referred to as the M60A3 Passive, uses the same passive gunner's sight as the A1 RISE Passive and the latest version has a Tank Thermal Sight (TTS). The M60A1, RISE, and RISE Passive tanks used a coincidence rangefinder and the mechanical M19 ballistic computer. The M60A3 uses a laser based rangefinder and the solid state M21 ballistic computer. The M21 FCS for the M60A3 was made up of a Raytheon AN/WG-2 flash-lamp pumped ruby-laser based range finder, accurate up to 5,000 meters (16,000 ft) for both the commander and gunner, a solid-state M21E1 gun data computer incorporating a muzzle reference sensor and crosswind sensor, ammunition selection, range correction and superelevation correction were inputted by the gunner, an improved turret stabilization system along with an upgraded turret electrical system and solid-state analog data card bus. The M10A2E3 ballistic drive is an electro-mechanical unit.

The commander had an M36E1 passive periscope and the gunner an M32E1 passive sight. The TTS configuration replaced the gunner's sight with the Raytheon AN/VSG2 Tank Thermal Sight (TTS), a Mercury-Cadmium-Telluride (HgCdTe) IR detector. This sight allows the gunner to see through fog, smoke and under starlight conditions without the aid of an IR searchlight. This system provided improved night fighting capabilities.

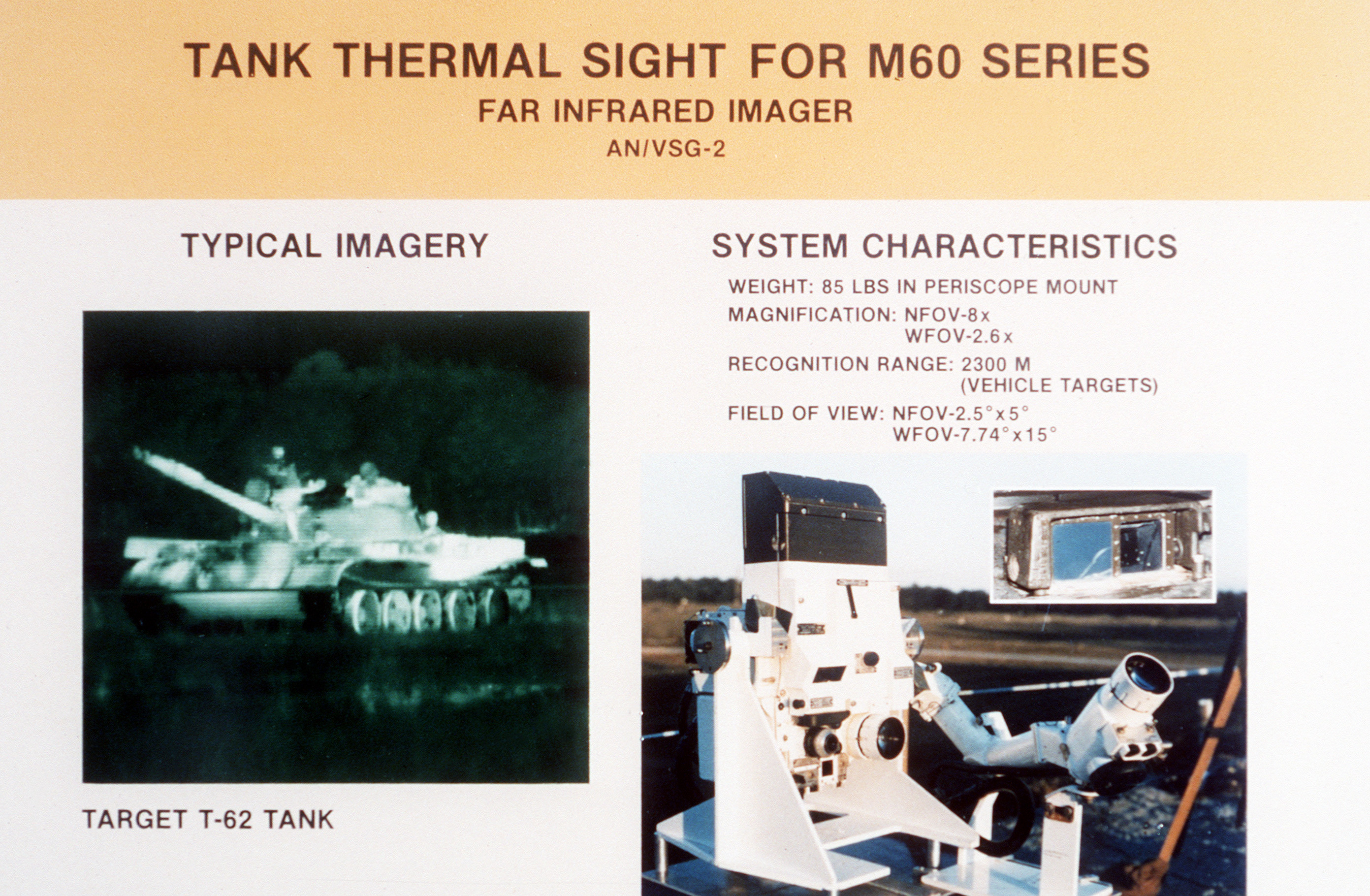
Detailed view and output image of the AN/VSG-2 thermal sight used on TTS vehicles.

The first M60A3s were assembled at the Detroit Arsenal Tank Plant in February 1978, where the first of a low-rate of initial production quantity of 296 M60A3s were produced through October with fielding to Army units in Europe starting in May 1979. The M60A3 was seen by the US Army as a stop-gap measure as the development of the XM1 Abrams MBT was already well advanced with fielding to Europe planned to start in 1981 and notified Foreign Military Sales (FMS) customers of its near-term plans to discontinue M60-series tank production.

In March 1982, General Dynamics Land Systems purchased Chrysler Defense. The production of M60A3 and M60A3 TTS tanks ended in May and the procurement for the US Army in June 1983 with the purchase of 120 M60A3 TTS tanks, while conversions for older tanks to the M60A3 (for Saudi Arabia, and M60A3 hulls for Taiwan) was expected to end in May 1985 after over 15,000 M60s were built in total, but in May 1985, Egypt placed an order for 94 M60A3 tanks at the cost of US$165 million. In 1986, the Egyptian order was completed. These were converted from existing M60A1 tanks in the US CONUS inventory.

The Army also increased its M60A3 TTS fleet through the M60A1 Product Improvement Program (PIP) and the M60A3 tank field retrofit program conducted by the Anniston Army Depot and the Mainz Army Depot (MZAD). Depot field teams retrofitted all of the Army's 748 M60A3 tanks to the TTS configuration by the end of 1984. In addition, both depots converted a total of 1,391 M60A1 RISE tanks to the M60A3 TTS standard in that same year. In 1989, the US Army had a total of 5,400 M60A3 TTS, of which 1,686 were newly built tanks, 114 were M60A1 passive tanks retrofitted to the M60A3 TTS standard, and 3,600 were conversions made by the Anniston Army Depot and Mainz Army Depot. These M60A1 RISE PIP conversion programs were concluded in 1990s.

Italy, Austria, Greece, Morocco, Taiwan, and other countries upgraded their existing fleets with various E60B component upgrades under several FMS defense contracts with Raytheon and General Dynamics during the mid to late 1980s. In 1990, M60A3/E60Bs from Army surpluses were sold to Oman, Bahrain, and Saudi Arabia.

The M60A3 replaced the M60A1 in the US Army and any remaining M48A5s in ARNG service on a one-for-one basis. The Marine Corps continued to use the M60A1 RISE Passive until they were withdrawn from combat use in 1991. They were phased from ARNG service between 1994 and 1997, being replaced with the M1 MBT. The Detroit Tank Plant was closed in 1996 with production of the M1A1 Abrams continuing at the Lima Tank Plant in Ohio.

=== E60 series ===
M60s for use in foreign military service were designated as the E60 series by the US Foreign Military Sales (FMS). These were essentially M60s with minor modifications requested by approved foreign purchasers. Some of the modifications included removal of the M19 cupola, different models of machine guns, electronics, fire control systems or radios, external armor plates, smoke launchers and power packs. Israel purchased many of these tanks forming the basis for the Magach 6 series.

This series included the following designations:

- E60: modified M60 variant for non-US service
- E60A: modified M60A1 variant for non-US service
- E60B: modified M60A3 variant for non-US service

The M60A2 was never approved for foreign sales.

== Army National Guard evaluations ==
=== M60AX ===
Priority in initial M1 Abrams unit allotments was given to Active Army armored units in Europe. The Army National Guard's armored assets were key strategic elements, approximated at 3,000 tanks, and were important for reinforcing Active Army units in Europe in case of conflict. Without an inventory available to provide the ARNG with M1 Abrams tanks, unfunded Requests for Proposals (RFPs) were circulated by the ARNG Tracked Vehicle Task Force starting in 1983. Teledyne Continental developed the first RFP upgrades to the suspension, power pack and transmission. It was demonstrated and tested at Fort Knox in January 1985. The upgrade was not evaluated for US military service or assigned a designation. GDLS acquired Teledyne and by 1987 had pursued the RFP improvement to the armor, mounted the M68A1, and called it the Super 60. It was the reference point for the ARNG upgrade decisions submitted to the Department of the Army to upgrade its M60A3 TTS fleet. In the actual report, the upgrade is referred to as the M60AX. $90 million was requested for prototyping and $2.8 billion to complete the fleet conversion by fiscal year 1989.

=== M60A4 ===
The M60A4 was the proposed upgrade of the M60A3 TTS for the National Guard that emerged from the M60AX study conducted by the ARNG Tracked Vehicle Task Force with a projected cost of $750,000 per tank. The upgrade would have included improved protection, automotive performance and combat effectiveness, but retained the same M68E1 gun as the M60A3. Since the M60AX evaluation vehicle was not in the US Army Logistical system (Note: US Army Master Data File – Under the authority of HQDA ODCS, G-4 (DA G-4), the U.S. Army Materiel Command’s Logistics Support Activity (USAMC LOGSA) maintains cataloging descriptions and technical information on equipment items in a centralized database called the Army Maintenance Master Data File (MMDF).) the requested components for the upgrade were inferred to by FSCM (Note: US Army Federal Supply Code Management (superseded by CAGE Commercial and Government Entity) – They are used by the U.S. government to suppliers of defense and governmental agencies. They are used for used alongside the part number from the supplier to identify or record of a requested part or component.) part numbers. After examining more than two dozen possible upgrade components for the M60A3 TTS, the task force decided on the 15 subsystem upgrades that made up the M60A4 overhaul. Survivability upgrades included both appliqué and wraparound armor, internal spall liners, laser protection, an automatic fire suppression system, an engine smoke generation kit and a new low-profile cupola. Mobility enhancements included a new 1,050 horsepower engine, a new automatic transmission, improved final drives, an improved vehicle suspension and a modification to the air cleaner. The M60A4's key target acquisition and fighting improvements were an upgraded laser rangefinder, an enhancement of TTS optical performance, a modified fire control system and an improved turret drive and stabilization system. After reviewing the proposal it was declined by the Chief of Staff of the United States Army General Carl E. Vuono in 1988. No prototype was ever constructed.

The US Army did not view the M60A4 as a cost-effective proposition for the National Guard with only a limited increase in crew survivability and the same firepower as the M60A3. The M60 tank was superseded in ARNG service by the M1 version of the Abrams tank beginning in 1990. The M60A3 was phased out from ARNG service and was fully replaced by the M1A1 by 1997. Most of the M1 Abrams tanks were upgraded to the M1A1 configuration.

== Foreign upgrades ==
A US Congressional Report in November 1993 stated that there were 5,522 serviceable M60A1 and M60A3 tanks in the US Army's inventory available for sale or transfer to US allies or foreign nations. Of these, 111 were in Korea, 1,435 were in Europe, and 3,976 located in CONUS. The average age of these tanks was 16 years and an expected peacetime service life of 20 years. The average price was US$212,898 per tank as is, without radios or machine guns and they were not mechanically overhauled. Tanks located in Korea were inspected and sold to Bahrain and Taiwan.

Of the 1,435 tanks in Europe, 1,311 have been cascaded to other NATO countries under the terms of the Conventional Forces Europe Agreement (CFE), 18 reserved for non-combat use and 106 returned to CONUS. Egypt inspected 411 tanks at Fort Hood and 91 at Fort Knox and tentatively selected 299 of those. An additional inventory of tanks from the CONUS M60 fleet were available at the same unit price for other approved purchasers.

The United States chose not to pursue further upgrades to the M60 tank series after 1978. With its near-term replacement by the Army with the M1 MBT being scheduled to start production in 1980. M60 series tanks were phased out of US service by 1997 and Opposing Force (OPFOR) training use in 2005. Together with the large number of M60 MBTs still in foreign service and a large US Army surplus inventory, several upgrades for the tank were offered starting in 1985.

There are three basic approaches to upgrade decisions for the M60 MBT. Some countries, such as Taiwan and Jordan, have sought to modernize the M60 as a frontline MBT. Turkey is seeking a middle-ground, keeping it useful as it develops more modern designs. Other countries, such as Egypt, Saudi Arabia and Thailand are modernizing their M60 fleets for counter-insurgency type operations.

While the market for M60 modernization is somewhat limited, because the tank is generally operated by poorer countries or has been relegated to secondary tasks, other companies have come up with more advanced Service Life Extension Program (SLEP) upgrade solutions. Additionally, several countries also funded their own design upgrades, notable examples are the Magach, Sabra and Phoenix variants. In 2005, M60 variants were in service with Egypt, Greece, Israel, Jordan, Turkey, Taiwan, and some 20 other nations to varying degrees.

=== High Performance/Super M60 Main battle tank ===
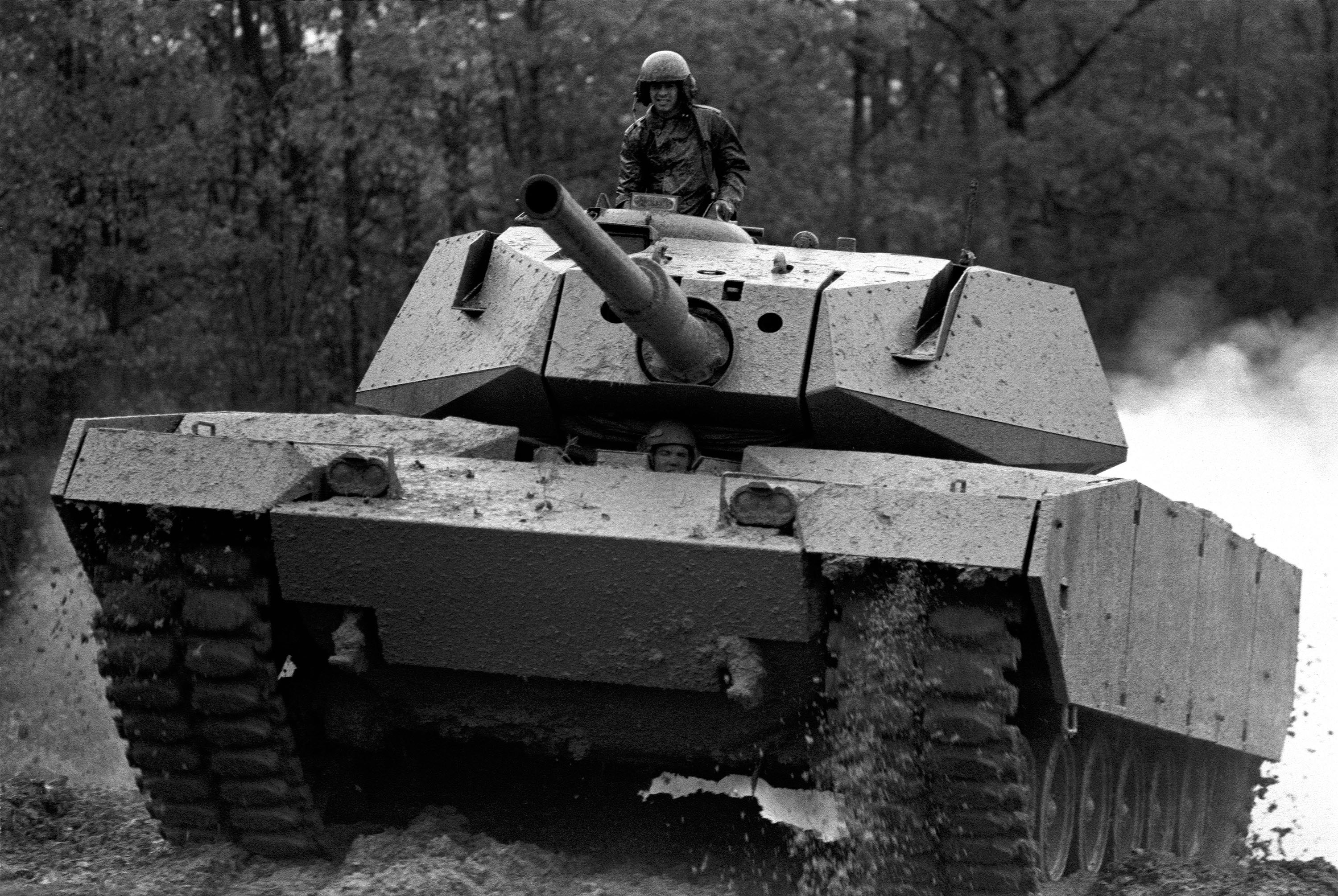
The Teledyne Continental High Performance M60 prototype, 1981

The High Performance M60, also called Super M60, was a comprehensive update package for the M60A1 and A3 tanks, first demonstrated and tested in 1985 by Teledyne Continental. The vehicle was developed as a private venture for the export market and was never evaluated for US military service. Unofficially called the M60AX, the upgrade offered to increase the protection, firepower and mobility for the M60A1 and A3 tanks.

The Super M60 prototype was based on an M60A1 leased from the US Army. It featured the AVCR-1790-1B engine producing 1,200 hp (890 kW) coupled to a Renk RK-304 transmission with four forward and four reverse gears. The torsion bar suspension system of the M60 was replaced with a hydropneumatic suspension system (HSS) developed by the National Waterlift Company as seen on the HIMAG, General Motors XM1, and the Jordanian Centurion (Tariq). Over the M60A1, the Super M60's top speed increased to 45 mph (72 km/h) and power/weight ratio increased to 23.1 hp/t (17.2 kW/t), despite the 9,500 lb (4,300 kg) increase in weight. This High Performance configuration was demonstrated and tested at Fort Knox in January 1985 but was not designated. Although the US Army chose not to adopt the installation of a new power pack or suspension system in the M60 series, General Dynamics formed a co-operative private venture with Teledyne Continental to develop a comprehensive upgrade package.

Survivability was enhanced with a layer of Chobham spaced applique armor built around the turret and frontal arc of the hull that noticeably changed its appearance. The applique armor consisted of an outer layer of high-hardness steel armor panels and an inner layer of ceramic inserts covering the base M60A1 vehicle. Track skirts consisted of Sitall and high-hardness steel for the hull sides as well as Kevlar spall liners for the fighting compartment. Like the vehicle it is based on, it retained a crew of four: the commander, loader and gunner positioned in the turret and the driver in the front of the hull.

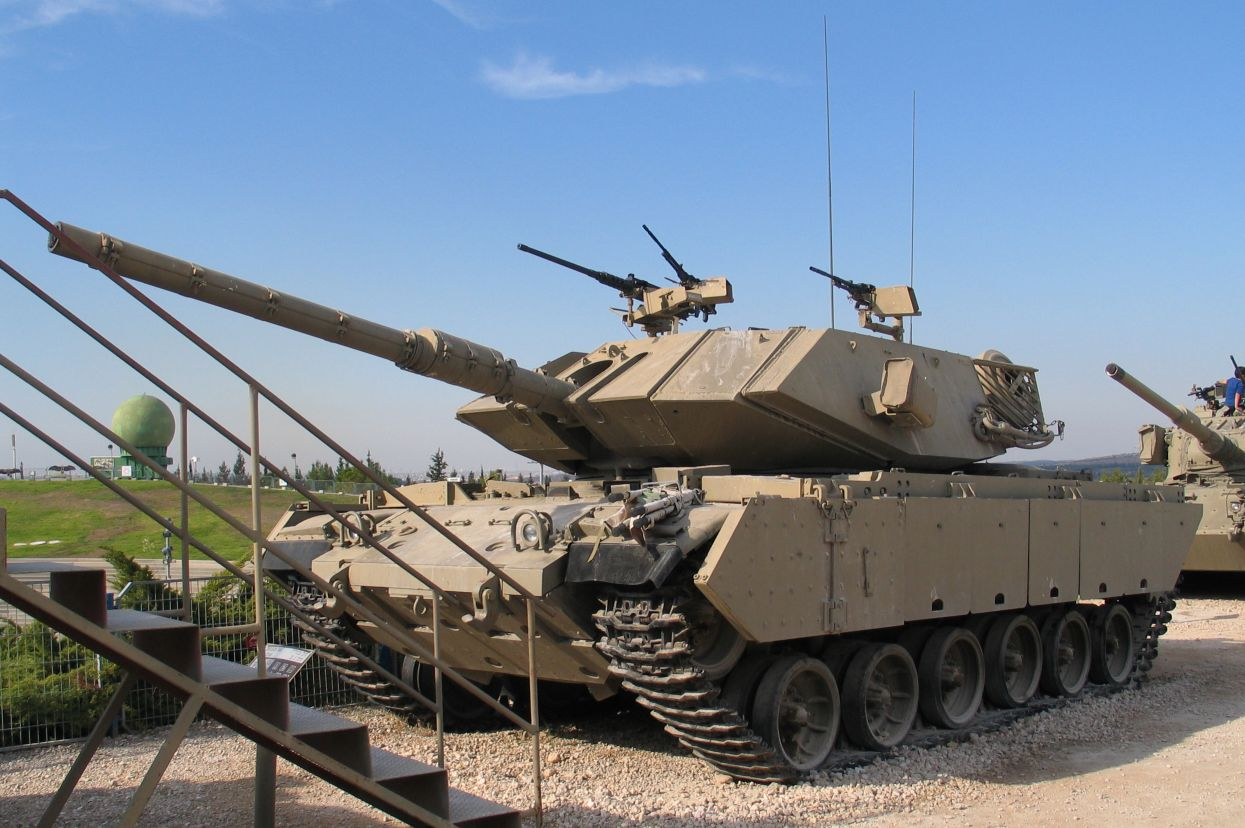
A Magach 7C in Yad la-Shiryon museum, Latrun

The weapons of the Super M60 are similar to those of the M60A3. The main gun is the rifled 105 mm/L52 M68A1E2 with a thermal sleeve. The 7.62 mm M73 coaxial machine gun used on the M60A1 was replaced with a 7.62 mm M240C, with the same number of rounds. The M19 cupola was replaced with a low silhouette model with a pop-up hatch for the commander and a 12.7 mm M2HB machine gun on a pintle mount with 600 rounds. The Fire Control System (FCS) used was designated the Advanced Laser Tank Fire Control System (LTFCS).

The FCS configuration was largely similar to that used on the M60A3, but instead of replacing the optical rangefinder with an AN/VVG-2 laser rangefinder, a Nd:YAG laser emitter was installed on the roof and the M35 gunner's sight was modified to include a laser visual unit. Also, the stabilization configuration was changed to that of the M1 Abrams where the sight itself was fully stabilized and the gun followed the sight. The prototype did not have an optical range finder but one could have been easily installed.

After initial tests with only the new engine and suspension, additional modifications such as the armor upgrade intended to increase protection from shaped charged projectiles were applied. Testing conducted not only showed that the new suspension system smoothened the off-road ride, but also allowed the Super M60 to handle well in spite of its considerable weight increase over the original M60A1. As one of the first upgrade packages offered for the M60 series, the Super M60 prototype demonstrated the potential for upgrading the M60A1/A3 and was offered by GDLS as one of their many possible upgrade packages.

Even though this update package offered M60 users an opportunity to dramatically increase the combat capabilities of their tank fleets, no country ever bought the update and the program effectively ceased by the end of the Cold War. Only one prototype was built. The overall failure of the Super M60 program was likely due to the lack of immediate necessity for such a vehicle. This design was similarly developed independently by Israel in their Magach 7 series. Additionally the German company Krauss-Maffei Wegmann offered the Super M48, applying this design's technology to the M48A2/A3.

=== M60-2000 ===
The General Dynamics Land Systems (GDLS) M60-2000 or 120S was an upgrade of the M60A1 tank. The development of the M60-2000 was primarily due to the large number of M60 Main Battle Tanks in service with many Middle Eastern nations unable to afford a sufficient force of more modern main battle tanks. The upgrade was marketed at those M60 users with the industrial capability to convert the tanks themselves. The M60-2000/120S was a GDLS supplied conversion kit that married the M1A1 turret of the M1 Abrams to the M60A1 RISE hull, offering many features of the M1A1 Abrams to existing M60 users at a reduced cost.

It was first referred to the M60-2000 Program and design work began in late 1999 by General Dynamics Land Systems as a private venture for the export market and was never evaluated for US military service. Later the M60 designation was dropped because of the extensive changes and to highlight this as a new vehicle to potential customers thus changing the name to the 120S Project. The M60-2000 was test-marketed during 2000 and a number of countries in NATO and the Middle East were briefed on the vehicle. Following customer feedback, detailed engineering work was carried out and in December GDLS decided to build a functional prototype. The company rolled out the proof of concept prototype of the 120S tank at their Detroit, Michigan, facility in August 2001. It was shown at the IDEF Exhibition held in Turkey in October 2001.

The 120S was initially aimed at the Turkish Land Forces Command (TLFC) M60 upgrade requirement but this competition was subsequently won by IMI Military Industries with their Sabra II upgrade. The Egyptian Army was considering this offer until it was finally rejected in favor of a licensed contract to build M1s in Egypt. Only one prototype was made. As of early 2009, there were no sales of the 120S tank and was no longer mentioned in General Dynamics marketing literature. The prototype was disassembled and the hull and turret returned to the US Army in 2003.

=== M60A3 Phoenix ===
The M60 Phoenix Project was Jordan's modular upgrade of the M60A3TTS to better address both immediate and emerging threats to the M60MBT. The tank is armed with a RUAG Land Systems L50 120 mm smoothbore Compact Tank Gun (CTG) with a firing rate of 6–10 rounds per minute. 20 ready rounds are stored in the turret bustle. The M21 FCS is replaced with Raytheon's Integrated Fire Control System (IFCS). The system consists of an eye safe laser rangefinder, second generation night sight, digital ballistic computer, cant sensors and a MIL-STD 1553 data bus. The M10 ballistic drive is upgraded with a fully electrical superelevation resolver.

The maneuverability and acceleration of the Phoenix is improved with the use of the General Dynamics AVCR-1790-2C engine producing 950 hp increasing available power by 20%, an upgraded CD-850-B1 transmission, new air cleaner and air induction systems, improved suspension and new and improved final drives. Survivability is improved through the addition of various modular armor protection schemes for both the M60's turret and hull. The upgrades include armor protection with STANAG 4569 Level 6 protection plates to the frontal arc, passive and reactive armor panels and side skirts and slat armor added to the bustle, protecting the rear of the turret from RPG attack.

The protection scheme can be reconfigured to changing threat conditions. It also has a 12 tube High Speed Directed Launcher (HSDL) smoke screen system using a multi-spectral smoke hardkill providing protection against thermal detection. On 15 April 2004 Raytheon Company was awarded a $64.8 million contract by the Jordan armed forces to upgrade three tank battalions.

Raytheon has been working with Jordan's King Abdullah II Design and Development Bureau (KADDB) on its Phoenix Level 1 Independent Fire Control System (IFCS) upgrade and Level 2 Lethality upgrade efforts for the M60 main battle tank. Some of the upgrades included passive spaced armor packages, IR jammers and an ammunition containment system for the turret bustle. A $46.6M contract with the Jordan Armed Forces was authorized in 2012 to upgrade one battalion of their Phoenix main battle tanks.

=== Raytheon M60A3 SLEP ===
Raytheon in conjunction with other partners offered the M60 Service Life Extension Program (SLEP) for the M60A3 in May 2016. It has been marketed for export to nations that need the performance improvements to take on modern armor threats. The SLEP is offered as a collection of modular upgrades for the tank's firepower, mobility, and protection. This allows for SLEP customization to each user's needs. Its firepower improvements features the 120 mm M256 smoothbore main gun as used on the M1A1 Abrams. It is fitted with a load assist system allowing for a firing rate of 6 to 10 rounds per minute and 20 ready-rounds in the turret bustle.

The Raytheon Integrated Fire Control System (IFCS) integrating an eye safe laser rangefinder, second generation gunner's night sight, digital ballistic computer, cant sensors, a fully electrical superelevation resolver and a MIL-STD-1553 data bus, giving the system capabilities similar to the M1AD standard. Other turret upgrades offered are the Curtis-Wright Gun Turret Drive and replacing the M19 cupola with a Hitrole remote controlled weapon system, that enables 360° panoramic surveillance from a secure position inside the tank armed with a M2HB .50cal machine gun.

Suspension and mobility upgrades include an upgraded AVCR-1790-2C engine producing 950 hp and improved hydropneumatic suspension. The installation of an Automatic Fire and Explosion Sensing and Suppressing system (AFSS) that improves soldier survivability and protects the engine compartment as standard. Upgraded armor protection with STANAG 4569 Level 6 protection plates to the frontal arc and side skirts and slat armor added to the bustle, protecting the rear of the turret from RPG attack. These changes increased the vehicle weight to 62–63 tons.

=== Leonardo M60A3 SLEP ===
The Leonardo M60A3 is a modular SLEP upgrade for the M60MBT offered in 2017 by the defense company Leonardo DRS. The upgrade is intended to offer nations already operating the M60 a modular upgrade solution for their vehicles to offer capabilities more in line with third-generation main battle tanks. It was unveiled 17 October 2017 at the Bahrain International Defense Exhibition and Conference (BIDEC). It has been marketed as an alternative upgrade to the Raytheon SLEP upgrade for M60MBT modernization.

Upgrades offered in this package include a new 120/45 gun from the Centauro II that offers a weight saving of 500 kg (1,100 lb) over the older 120/44 gun due to a redesigned light alloy cradle and muzzle brake. The old commander's cupola is completely removed and replaced instead with an armored circular ballistic plate protected with slat armor. This also offers a weight reduction compared to the original M19 cupola as used on the M60A3. For close defense, the turret is also fitted with the HITROLE-L 12.7mm remotely operated weapons system.

The turret has been refitted with a new set of hydraulic and servo controls improving performance. The rest of the vehicle is completely overhauled including the torsion bars, brakes, fuel supply, electric system, wheels, seals, paint, and smoke grenades. The vehicle has also been retrofitted with the Automatic Fire and Explosion Sensing and Suppression System (AFSS). It is equipped with the LOTHAR gun sight, DNVS-4 Driver's Night Vision Sight and TURMS digital fire control system. a daytime TV camera, and an eye-safe Laser range finder. IED jamming systems and a laser warning receiver system developed by Leonardo are optionally offered.

Armor improvements include a new passive protection suite fitted around the M60's existing cast armor turret and hull that is claimed to meet STANAG Level 6 standards. Protection for the turret is optimized for protection against kinetic energy (KE) weapons and artillery across the frontal arc. The hull is upgraded to the same standard with the protection covering the hull sides extending to the third roadwheel. For the rear of the turret, slat armor is provided with an emphasis on protecting against RPGs.

Mobility is improved via either a full refurbishment of the existing power packs or an upgrade. The new powertrain offered is stated to deliver up to 20% more power without high costs and avoiding the need for any modifications to the existing hull. This AVDS-1790-5T 908 hp (677 kW) engine replaces the 750 hp (560 kW) engine and is connected to an upgraded CD-850-B1 transmission. It was unveiled at the Bahrain International Defense Exhibition and Conference (BIDEC) at Manama, Bahrain in 2017.

=== M60-3105 ===
Belgian Company John Cockerill Defense unveiled a modernized turret-replacement solution concept for the M60 tank at EDEX 2025 in Cairo, Egypt. This SLEP upgrade is equipped with a new modernized composite armored turret and its Cockerill 3105 105mm weapon station replacing the M60's original steel-cast T95E7 turret. It integrates advanced fire control, hunter-killer optics and a full digital architecture providing modern lethality and networked capabilities without the cost burden of next-generation tanks. The system supports programmable ammunition and features autoloading, reducing crew size and increasing survivability.

The 3105 turret is fully stabilized and can fire on the move and engage targets with first-round hit probability at long ranges. The 3105-turret protection scheme is modular and can be outfitted with secondary armament such as a 7.62mm coaxial machine gun and a remote-controlled 12.7mm machine gun. It also supports active protection systems (APS) and advanced battlefield management systems, giving the M60 a real-time edge on the digital battlefield. The turret's fire control is stabilized and designed for day/night operations with targeting capabilities comparable to those found on NATO-standard light tanks such as the Swedish CV90 or Spanish ASCOD. The solution is being targeted for militaries across Africa, the Middle East, and Asia that still operate legacy M60 tank fleets. Platform integration is being evaluated for demonstrational trials in 2026.

== U.S. service history ==
Fifteen of the early examples of the M60 produced had insufficient hull armor thickness, and were therefore used by the Armor School at Fort Knox to train tank crewmembers and maintenance personnel.

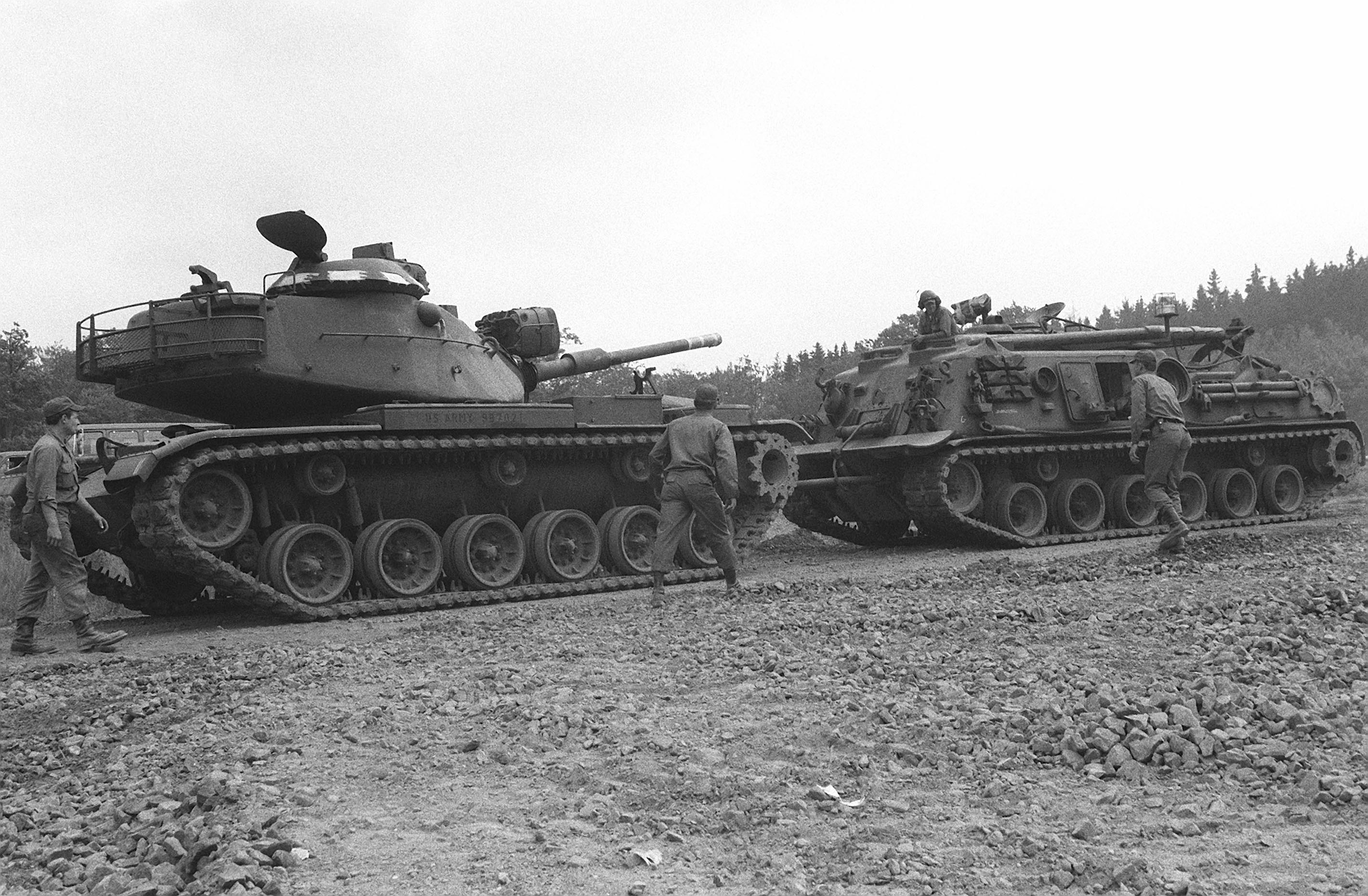
An M88 Recovery Vehicle towing an M60 tank for Exercise REFORGER 1978

The M60 AVLB and M728 Combat Engineer Vehicle were the only variants of the M60 series deployed to South Vietnam during the Vietnam War. The M728 was used in fire support, base security, counter ambush fire, direct assault of fortified positions, and limited reconnaissance by fire. The AVLB provided gap crossing capabilities when required to support armored forces. M60 tanks were deployed to West Germany during the Cold War and participated in annual REFORGER exercises as well as Armed Forces Day parades in West Berlin until 1991. The M60 was also deployed to Korea to support U.S. Forces Korea and participated in bi-annual Exercise Team Spirit maneuvers with South Korea notably with the U.S. Army's 2nd Infantry Division until 1991.

On 12 October 1973, President Nixon authorized Operation Nickel Grass that transferred M60 tanks to support Israel during the 1973 Yom Kippur War. On 21 August 1976, President Ford conferred with Henry Kissinger and green lighted Operation Paul Bunyan with a platoon of M60A1s reinforcing elements of the US 9th Infantry Regiment (Task Force Vierra) at the south end of the Bridge of No Return in response to the Korean axe murder incident.

M60 tanks participated in Operation Urgent Fury in Grenada in 1983. Marines from G Company of the US 22nd Marine Assault Unit equipped with Amphibious Assault Vehicles and four M60A1 tanks landed at Grand Mal Bay on October 25 and relieved the Navy SEALs the following morning, allowing Governor Scoon, his wife, and nine aides to be safely evacuated. The Marine tank crews faced sporadic resistance, knocking out a BRDM-2 armored car. G Company subsequently overwhelmed the Grenadian defenders at Fort Frederick. The 1st Battalion, 8th Marine Regiment deployed with M60A1s to Beirut and were present during the subsequent October 23 Beirut barracks bombing near the Beirut International Airport during the ongoing Lebanese Civil War. In 1987, it was reported that 10% of the M-60 fleet was inoperable due to counterfeit bolts.

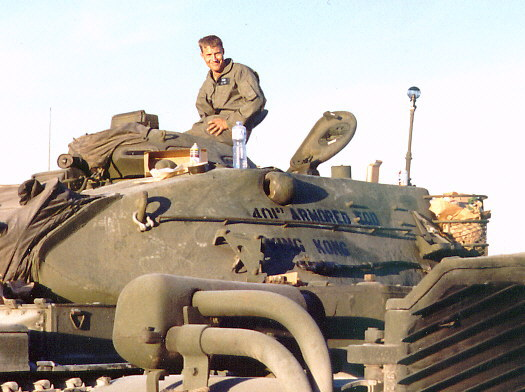
A 401st TFW (P) M60 seen at Doha, Qatar during the Gulf War of 1991

M60s have been historically used for Red Flag exercises, as well as in close air support trials with the F-16 at Nellis Air Force Base, Nevada in the 1980s. During Operation Desert Storm in the Gulf War of 1991, at least one US Air Force unit was equipped with M60 tanks. The 401st TFW (P), deployed to Doha, Qatar had two M60A3 tanks for use by explosives ordnance disposal personnel. It was planned that using the tanks would allow the EOD crews to remove unexploded ordnance from tarmac runway and taxiway surfaces with increased safety.

M60A1s of the 1st Marine Division Task Force Ripper led the drive to the Kuwait International Airport on 27 February 1991. The division commander Maj. Gen. J.M. Myatt said, "During the first day of combat operations 1st Platoon, D Company, 3rd Tank Battalion destroyed 15 Iraqi tanks". The Marines also destroyed 25 APCs and took 300 prisoners of war. The next day, Marine M60A1 tanks encountered a minefield and attempted to proof two lanes with the MCRS. Both were unsuccessful. One MCRS missed a mine, which blew apart a track of the tank pushing it, immobilizing the tank and blocking the lane. The 1st Marine Division encountered more Iraqi opposition as it proceeded north coming into contact with the Iraqi 15th Mechanized Brigade, 3rd Armored Division. During this engagement the Marines destroyed an additional 46 enemy vehicles and took approximately 929 POWs. Once the 1st Marine Division reached Kuwait International Airport they found what remained of the Iraqi 12th Armored Brigade, 3rd Armored Division defending it. The Marines destroyed 30 to 40 Iraqi T-72 tanks which had taken up defensive positions around the airport.

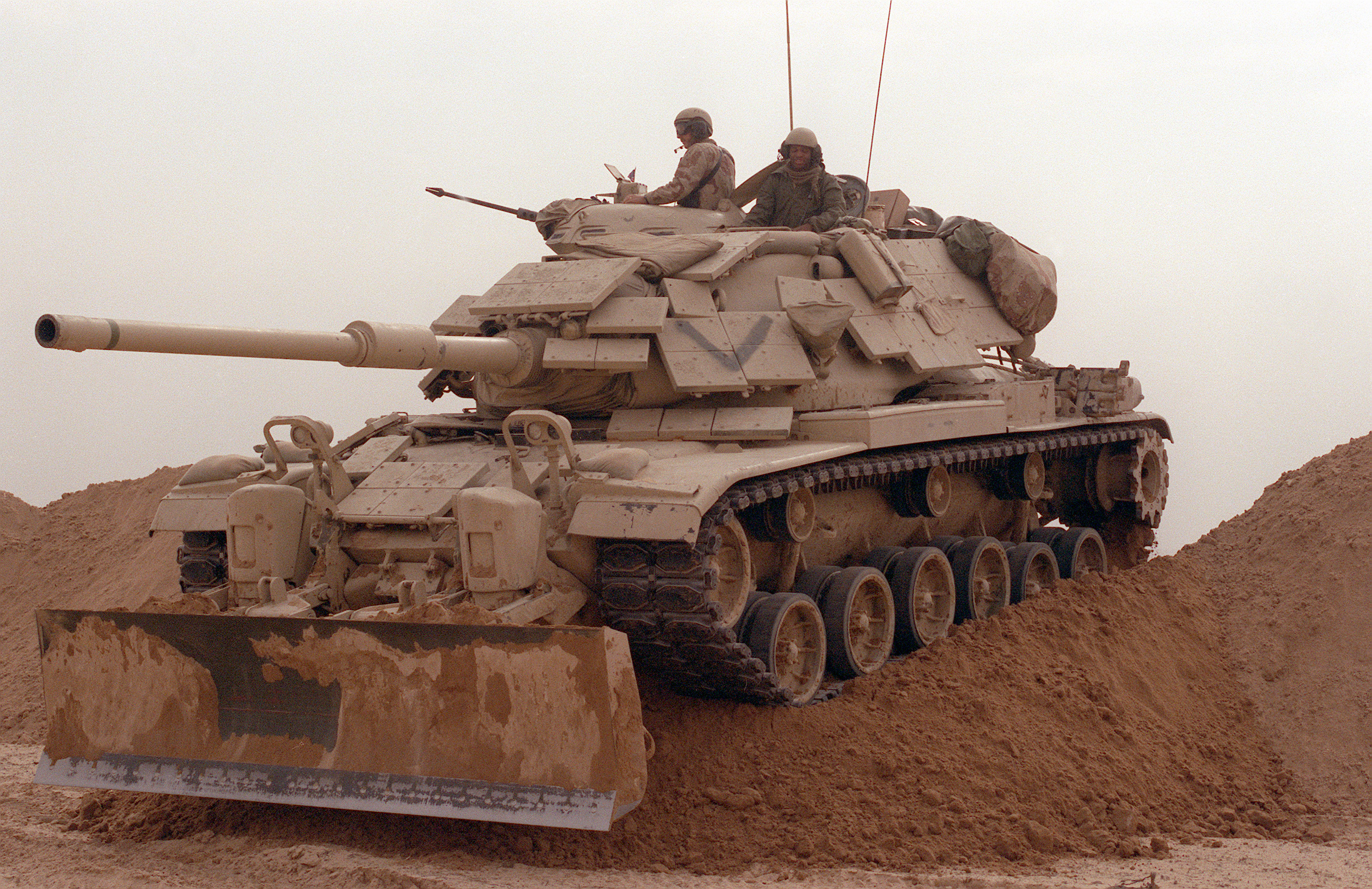
Marines from Company D, 2nd Tank Battalion, M60A1 main battle tank during a breach exercise in Operation Desert Storm. The tank is fitted with reactive armor and an M9 bulldozer kit.

After the conclusion of Operation Desert Storm, FORSCOM withdrew the M60 tank series from combat use and replaced it with the M1A1 Abrams for both the Army and Marine Corps. It was relegated to CONUS use with the Army National Guard through most of the 1990s. In May 1997, at Fort Riley, 1st Battalion, 635th Armor, Kansas Army National Guard, retired the last M60 series tanks in the US military. The 58 M60A3 tanks of the Kansas Guard's only armor battalion were unceremoniously parked in a holding pen at the Camp Funston Mobilization and Training Equipment Site (MATES), in the Kansas River Valley, down the hill from Fort Riley's main post. They were later transferred to the Jordanian Army.

Due to the restructuring of forces at the end of the Cold War, surplus US Army M1A1s were absorbed by the US Marines replacing their M60A1s on a one for one basis, allowing the Marine Corps to quickly become an all-M1 tank force at reduced cost. Except for a small number in TRADOC service for the combat training of units in Europe, most M60s were placed in reserve. Some 1,400 were transferred to NATO allies from 1991 to 1993 under the Treaty on Conventional Armed Forces in Europe and some were sold, mainly to Middle Eastern countries. Tanks were given to a few nations under governmental grants. They were finally declared as excess to US needs in 1994. They were superseded in National Guard service by the M1 version of the Abrams MBT and fully replaced by the M1A1.

After being retired from combat use in 1991, 18 M60A3s, with the M19 cupola removed, continued in active Army service to provide tactical combat training to US and NATO forces in Europe. They were fitted with the Multiple Integrated Laser Engagement System (MILES), given the mission to provide tactical engagement simulation for direct fire force-on-force training and were maintained at the Combat Maneuver Training Center (CMTC) near Hohenfels, Germany. They were used in the OPFOR Surrogate (OPFOR(S)) role by D Company 1st Battalion, 4th Infantry Regiment (Team Dragon) until May 2005. After their service as training aids, these examples were demilitarized and placed as target hulks on various firing ranges at the Grafenwoehr Training Area. They were replaced in this role by the Tonka tank (unofficial name) (Note: An unofficial name derived from the vehicle's similarity to Tonka toy trucks.) – an M113 OSV-T with a mock turret.

The large number of M60 series tanks still in the Army's CONUS inventory in 1994 were declared as excess to requirements and disposal of them began through grant programs or demilitarization at additional costs to the US government. Three M60 tanks were used by the state of Washington for Avalanche control in the mid-1990s with the last tank withdrawn from this role in 2018.

As of 2015, the US Army and Air Force continue to use QM60s on a limited basis as targets for the testing of radar and weapons systems. They are also salvaged for parts to maintain other vehicles still in service. One M60A1 hull was leased to General Dynamics for development of the M60-2000/120S during 2000–2001. The M68 105 mm Gun has been used for the M1128 Stryker MGS.

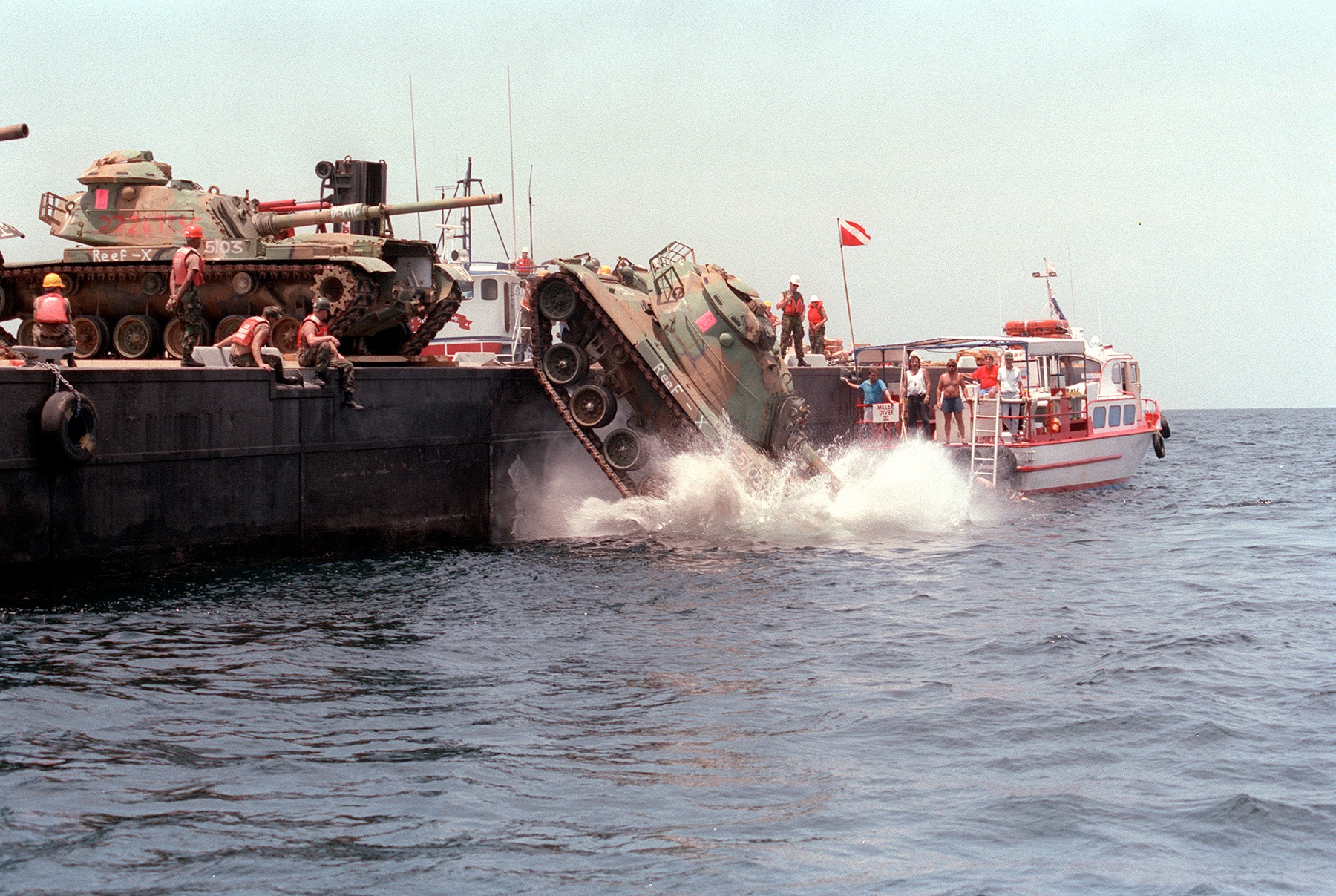
Retired M60 tanks being dumped in the Gulf of Mexico in 1994

Many are on public display in parks and museums or veteran service organizations as well as gate guards at military bases. Some 100 M60s are to be placed as artificial reefs off New Jersey and the Gulf coasts of Florida and Alabama accessible to scuba divers. The United States Army TACOM Life Cycle Management Command (TACOM-LCMC) has directed that the M728, M60AVLB and QM60-series target vehicles are to be withdrawn from use and logistical support by 2024 with any units remaining to be demilitarized and sold for scrapping through the DLA Disposition Services Defense Reutilization and Marketing Office (DLADS-DRMO).

== Variants ==
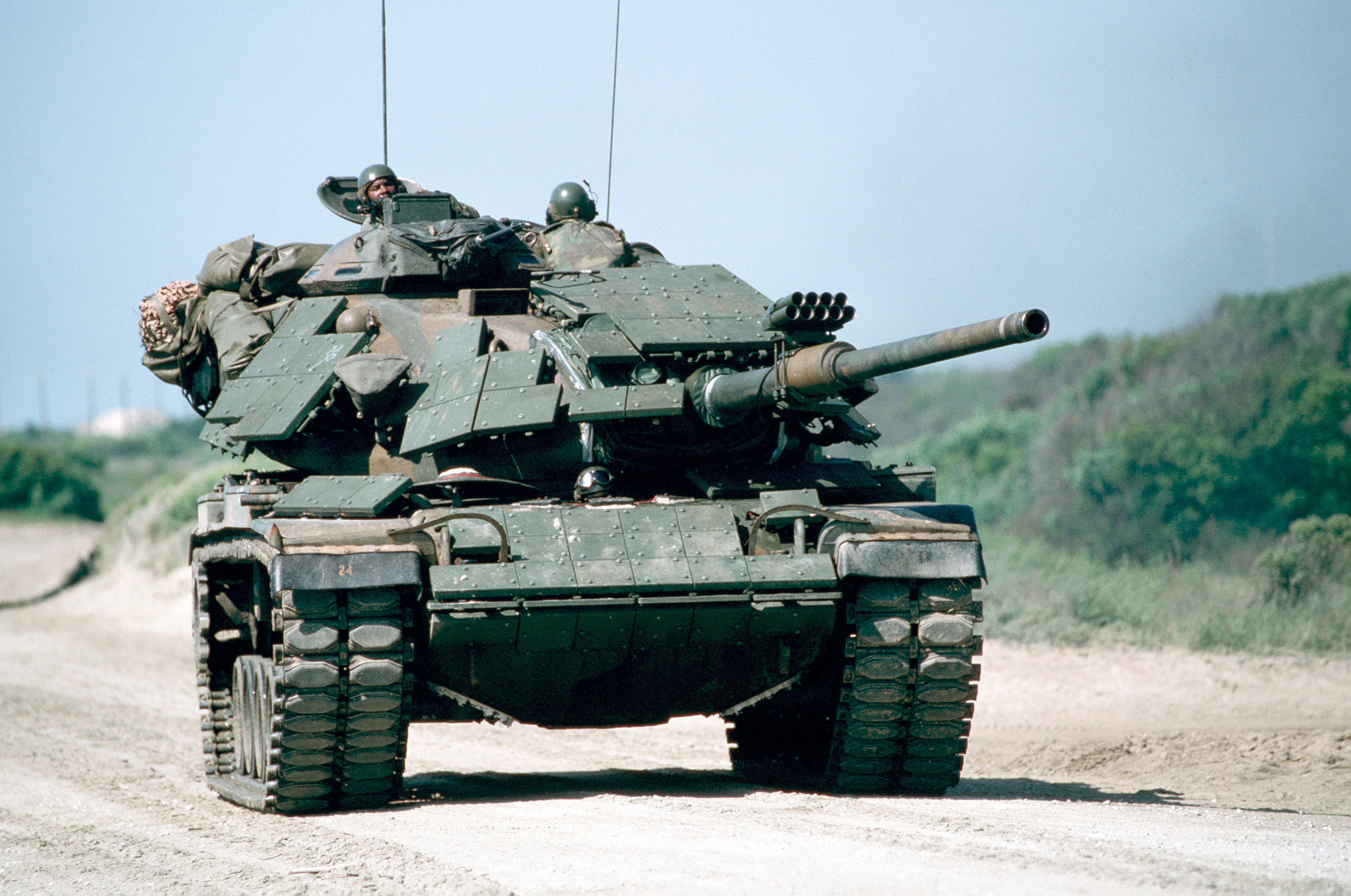
USMC M60A1 RISE equipped with explosive reactive armor (ERA)

- XM60: Conceptual prototypes using modified M48A2/M68 hulls and T95 turrets. Four different variants using 90mm, 105mm and 120mm guns. Developed in 1957.
- M60: Featured the M68 105mm main gun in the clamshell shaped Patton-styled T95E5 turret and several component improvements as well as the AVDS-1790-2A diesel engine and improved hull design. Some early production units did not have the commander's cupola.
- M60E1: Proof of concept prototype for the M60A1 mating an M60 hull to the T95E7 turret.
- M60A1: First variant to feature the distinctive "needle-nose" long nosed T95E7 turret, M73A1 coaxial machine gun along with increased hull armor protection, improved hydraulics and AVDS-1790-2A TLAC engine.
  - M60A1 AOS: Add-On Stabilization, introduced in 1972 for the M68 gun. M73A1 coaxial machine gun redesignated M219
    - M60A1 AOS+: M60A1 retrofitted with the TLAC & AOS upgrades and T142 track
  - M60A1 RISE: Reliability Improvement Selected Equipment, hull upgrade featuring AVDS-1790-2C RISE engine and redesigned hull electrical system allowing for easier access, servicing and removal, several automotive component upgrades, incorporated TLAC & AOS upgrades as well as the T142 track.
    - M60A1 RISE+: Passive night vision for gunner and commander, retrofitted with M68E1 main gun and M240C coaxial machine gun.
    - M60A1 RISE Passive: Incorporated all previous upgrades plus AVDS-1790-2D RISE engine and VEESS smoke system, deep water fording kit. US Marines outfitted with explosive reactive armor (ERA) in the late 1980s.
- XM66: Conceptual prototypes for development of the T95E7 Type A, Type B and Type C turret designs.
- M60A1E1: Developmental test vehicles consisting of XM81 152 mm gun-missile launchers mounted in T95E7 Type A turrets fitted to M60 hulls. 3 M60E1 tanks were used.
- M60A1E2: Prototype M60A1 hull mated to a compact T95E7 Type B turret design carrying the XM81E13 gun and accepted as M60A2.
- M60A1E3: Prototype, M60A1E2 Type B turret fitted with M68 105 mm gun.
- M60A1E4: Experimental concept type with remote control weapons. One Type C turret mock-up built.
- M60A2: Featured the M162 gun/launcher and compact turret fitted with Ford Aerospace M51 MCS. First variant to use a laser range finder.
- M60A3: turret upgrade fitted with a laser range finder, M21 solid state ballistic computer and a crosswind sensor. Sometimes referred to as the M60A3 Passive.
  - M60A3 TTS: Tank Thermal Sight; M60A3 fitted with the Raytheon AN/VSG-2 thermal sight.
- M60AX: unfunded ARNG Request for Proposal upgrade of the M60 tank. One M60AX demonstrational prototype built by GDLS.
- M60A4: proposed upgrade for ARNG tanks, never built.
- QM60: M60A1/A3 designation for target vehicles

=== Specialized ===
- M60 AVLB: armored vehicle-launched bridge with 60-foot (18 m) scissors bridge mated to the M60 hull.
  - M60 AVLM: M60 Armored Vehicle Launched Bridge (AVLB) with up to 2 vehicle mounted M58 MICLICs. To employ the system, the vehicle cannot be carrying a bridge. The system consists of an M147 firing kit, an M58A3 line charge and a 5-inch MK22 Mod 4 rocket. The line charge is 350 ft (110 m) long and contains 5 lb (2.3 kg) per linear foot of C-4 explosive. In the event a MICLIC fails to detonate normally, it can be manually activated by time-delay fuses every few feet along the length of it.
- M60VLPD 26/70E: Spanish Army bridgelayer based on the M60 with "Leguan bridge system". 12 converted from M60A1 hulls.
- M60 Tagash AVLB: Israeli variant of the M60AVLB. Upgraded with Merkava- based track and suspension, upgraded engine and 2 Tzmed tandem bridge sections.

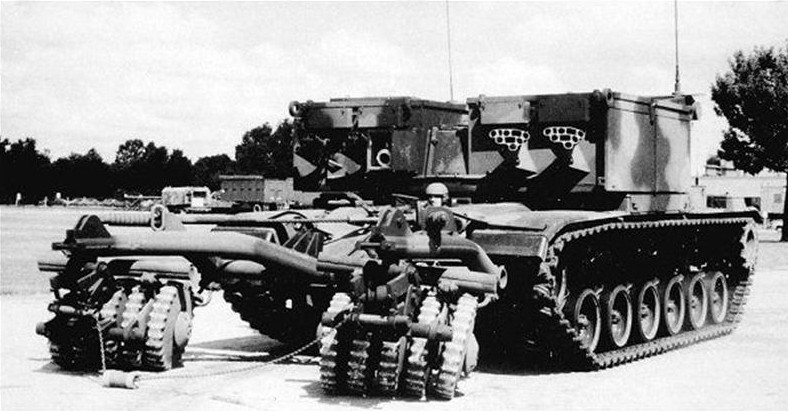
A XM1060 ROBAT circa 1982

- XM1060 ROBAT (Robotic Obstacle Breaching Assault Tank): A former M60A3 tank without its turret configured to clear mine fields and mark cleared lanes as well as to detect chemical, biological, and nuclear agents. It was fitted with a M1 MRCS mine roller and 2 M147 Line Charge Firing Kits. The crew may operate the vehicle via remote control by a fiber-optic video link, or the commander and driver sit in tandem in two armored pods fitted with an NBC protection system. The ROBAT fires an M58 MICLIC line charge filled with explosive over a minefield and then proofs the lane with a M1 MCRS. A Cleared Lane Marking System (CLAMS) dispenses day or chem-illuminescent light sticks from the rear to mark the cleared lane. Developed during the early 1980s and was canceled by 1988.

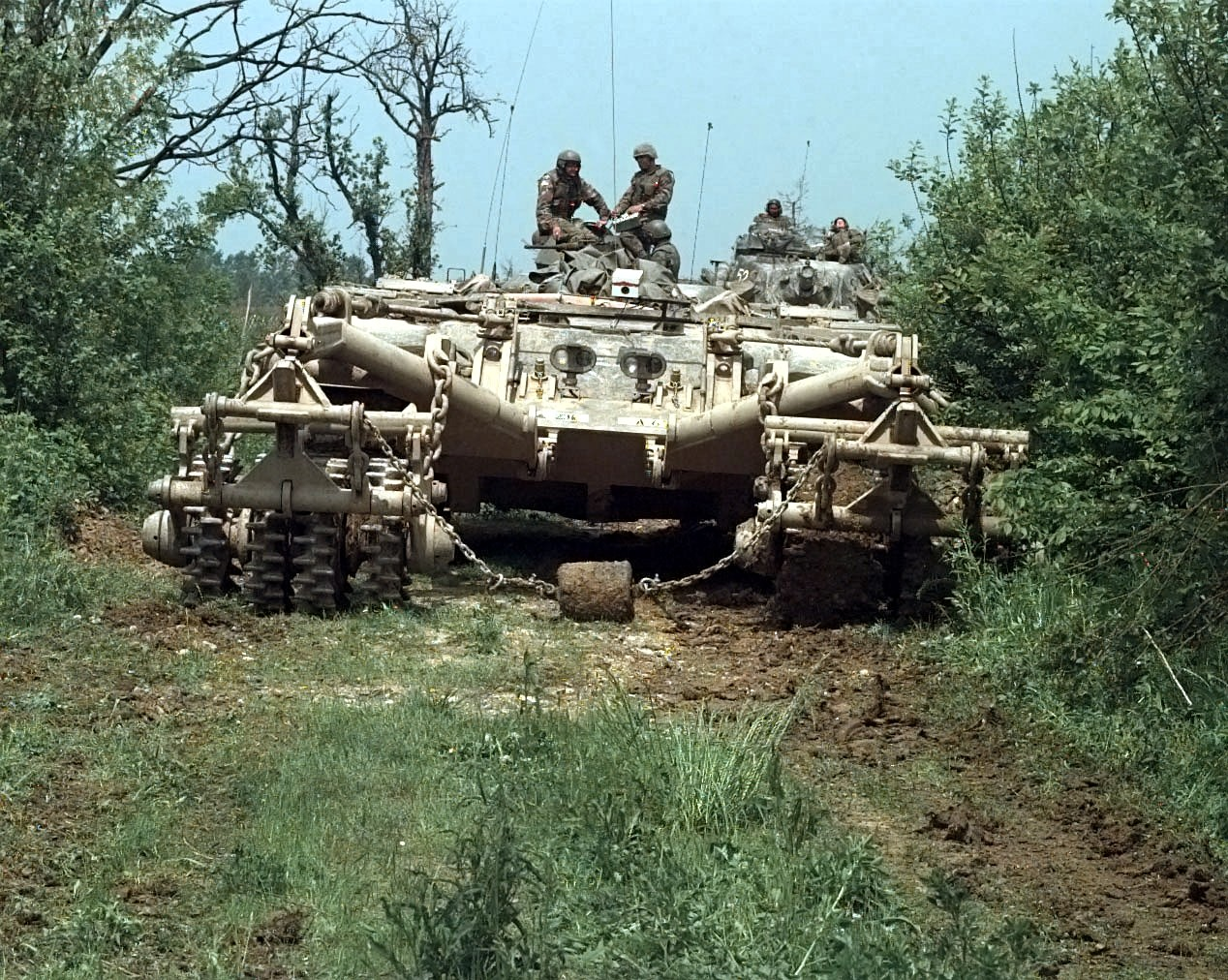
A Panther MDCV equipped with an M1 MCRS prepares to lead a column of vehicles down a road near McGovern Base, in Bosnia and Herzegovina on May 16, 1996, during Operation Joint Endeavor

- M60 Panther MDCV (Mine Detection and Clearing Vehicle): M60 without a turret fitted with countermine systems used by US forces during operations Joint Endeavor and Joint Task Force Eagle. The Panther can have a 2-man crew or be used as a remotely controlled vehicle. It is used to proof lanes and assembly areas. The system consists of a turretless M60 tank, Israeli Pearson mine rollers, an antimagnetic actuating device, and a Standardized Teleoperation System (STS) that is mounted in a separate vehicle. Additionally, a remote video camera allows the operator to see the road ahead. Only 6 built from former M60A3s, withdrawn from use by 2000 and superseded in role by IPM1 Panther 2.
- M88 ARV (Armored Recovery Vehicle): Armored recovery vehicle based on M60 chassis.
- Al-Monjed M60 ARV (Armored Recovery Vehicle): Jordanian M60 ARV variant. Starting in 1996, the King Abdullah II Design and Development Bureau (KADDB) began the conversion of 82 M60A1 RISE hulls into ARVs. The vehicle is based on the M60A1 RISE hull with an upgraded AVDS-1790-2DR engine. The turret has been replaced with a welded armored superstructure that provides protection from small arms and shell fragments. For recovery operations a turntable mounted hydraulically operated crane fitted with a telescopic jib is mounted on the front right side of the chassis. Additionally a hydraulically operated winch is located in the lower forward part of the chassis and leads out through the front of the vehicle. It has a front-mounted blade that can be used for vehicle stabilization or as a dozer blade. The vehicle is armed with a M2HB machine gun.
- M728 Combat Engineer Vehicle: Combat Engineer Vehicle fitted with a folding A-frame crane and winch attached to the front of the turret, and an M135 165mm demolition gun mated to the M60 hull.
- M60CZ-10/25E Alacran: Spanish Army combat engineer variant. The main gun was replaced with a back hoe and is armed with a machine gun. Based on the M60A1 RISE hull.

Additional equipment

- M9 Bulldozer Kit for the M60 series: (LIN B45390): (Note: The Line Item Number (LIN) is a six-character alphanumeric identification of the generic nomenclature assigned to identify nonexpendable and type classified expendable or durable items of equipment during their life cycle authorization and supply management. They are commonly used on the unit's property books.) The M9 bulldozer installed on the M60-series tank will increase the vehicle weight by 4.45 tons (4.04 metric tons). It is used to clear obstacles, leveling ground, filling depressions and to construct fighting positions. It is not to be used for demining activities. It is controlled by the driver.
- M1 Mine Clearing Roller System (MCRS) (LIN M18157): The MCRS is installed on the front of the tank through a removable adapter, and provides the capability for neutralization of Anti-Tank (AT) land mines, which are buried or laid on the surface, in the track path of the vehicle. The MCRS consists of two roller banks with two push arm assemblies. Each roller bank has five rollers, which apply ground pressure higher than that exerted by the tank. This principle ensures the explosion of pressure fused anti tank mines, which would otherwise explode under the track itself. The system weighs about 10 short tons (9.07 metric tons).
- Vehicle Magnetic Signature Duplicator (VEMSID): (LIN V53112) The VEMSID will increase the effectiveness and survivability of countermine equipment by triggering the stand-off detonation of magnetic influence mines at a safe distance ahead of the tank. It generates a multi-axial magnetic signature optimized for passively fused magnetic influence fused mines. The system is made up of four emitter coils, two associated power boxes and a MSD Control Unit (MSDCU).
- Pearson D7 Surface Mine Plow (SMP) (LIN B71620): It is a track-width plow designed to skim the surface of a flat roadway or trail, not to defeat buried mines. It is controlled by the driver.
- Track Width Mine Plow (TWMP) (LIN B71621): The Track Width Mine Plough (TWMP) uses a raking action to clear a safe path by bringing concealed or buried mines and improvised explosive devices (IEDs) to the surface and moving them wide and clear of the vehicle. It can be fitted with a MAD to counter magnetic influence fused mines.
- Full Width Mine Rake (FWMR) (LIN B51986): A rake assembly for unearthing and disposing of buried and surface laid mines in sand and loose earth. It was specifically designed and fabricated for use in Operations Desert Shield and Desert Storm. The tank needs to have the M9 Bulldozer Kit or a SMP installed first to employ the rake. It consists of a V-shaped tined plough that performs countermine activities by lifting buried mines with its tines and pushing them to the side as the vehicle moves forward. The FWMR also uses an aluminum skid shoe which protrudes from the front of the tines to allow the rake to maintain a consistent plowing depth. It clears a path measuring 180 inches wide, accommodating heavy tanks and other armored vehicles. Additional features are that it weighs 4000 pounds and is easily assembled and installed.

=== International ===
- E60 series: Foreign Military Sales designation for the M60 series
  - E60: modified M60 variant for non-US service.
  - E60A: modified M60A1 variant for non-US service.
  - E60B: modified M60A3 variant for non-US service. Late conversion E60B tanks sold to Israel omitted the commander's cupola.
- Iranian variants: All Iranian M60A1s were locally modified and given different local names.
  - Zulfiqar (the legendary sword of Ali): Iranian M60A1 variant. Armed with a Russian 2A46 125mm smoothbore main gun.
  - Samsam (Sword): Iranian upgraded version of M60A1 tank, fitted with reactive armor (presumably Kontakt-5), EFCS-3 Fire Control system, Laser warning system and IR jammers.
  - Soleiman-402: On September 1, 2024, the Information Agency of the Islamic Republic of Iran (IRNA) announced the official unveiling of a modernized version of the M60A1 MBT. It features a locally upgraded targeting system, SHORTA IR jamming system, communications system upgrades and a remote control weapon system (RCWS).
- Israeli variants: Many of the Israeli M60s have been upgraded with additional reactive or passive armor, drastically improving their armor protection. Israeli up-armored domestic versions are referred to as the Magach series and upgrade packages offered for export based on Magach 7 series are called Sabra packages.
  - Magach 6: Modernized M60/M60A1/M60A3. Fitted with the Urdan low profile cupola and Blazer ERA. Different configurations exist.
  - Magach 7: M60A1/A3 with 908 hp (677 kW) AVCR-1790-5A engine, additional passive armor, new fire control and Merkava-based tracks. Different configurations exist.
  - Sabra Mk I: Israeli offered modernized M60A1/E60A variant for export with upgraded AVCR-1790 900 hp (670 kW) engine and suspension. Armed with M68T 105mm gun. Some retained the M19 cupola and were fitted with ERA packages and steel side skirts.
  - Sabra Mk II: It is an upgrade package offered for the M60A1 tanks for the international customers. It features a MG251-LR 120mm main gun carrying 43 rounds, Elbit Knight fire control system, hybrid electrohydraulic turret drive, Orlite modular passive and ERA armor packages, SLAT armor for the turret, external armor plating to the hull front. Fitted with M19 style cupola. The power pack consisted of a 1,000 hp (750 kW) German RENK MTU 881 diesel engine coupled to a RENK 304S transmission and the same suspension and track assembly as the Merkava IV MBT. Upgrade packages for 170 M60A1 exported to Turkey.
  - Sabra Mk III: It is a further upgrade of Sabra Mk II offered for export.

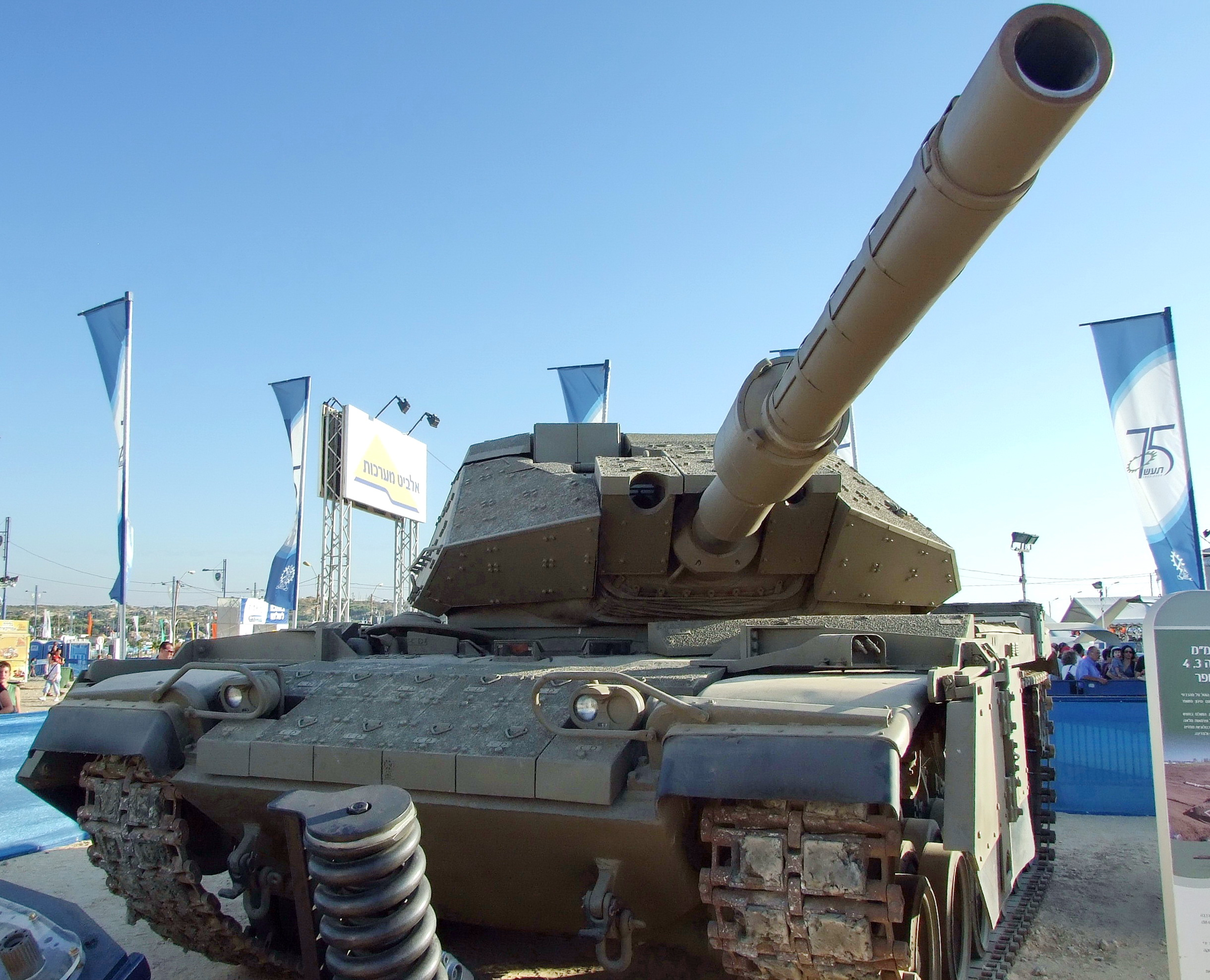
A Turkish M60A1 tank upgraded by Israel Military Industries with Sabra Mk II upgrade package, in Rishon LeZion, Israel, 2008

- Turkish variants: As a member of NATO, Turkey acquired a large fleet of M60A1 and A3 tanks. Many of them have been upgraded to the Sabra variant.
  - M60T tank: The M60T is an extensively modernized main battle tank (MBT) currently in service with the Turkish Land Forces. Those M60A1 tanks are improved by three major upgrade projects. The first generation of the Turkish Army M60T modernization is equipped with the Israeli Sabra Mk II upgrade package. The tank has since undergone further indigenous upgrades in Turkey under the "FIRAT-M6OT" and "TİYK" programs.
  - ROKETSAN's MZK Turret for M60A3: New turret offered for M60A3 tanks by Roketsan.

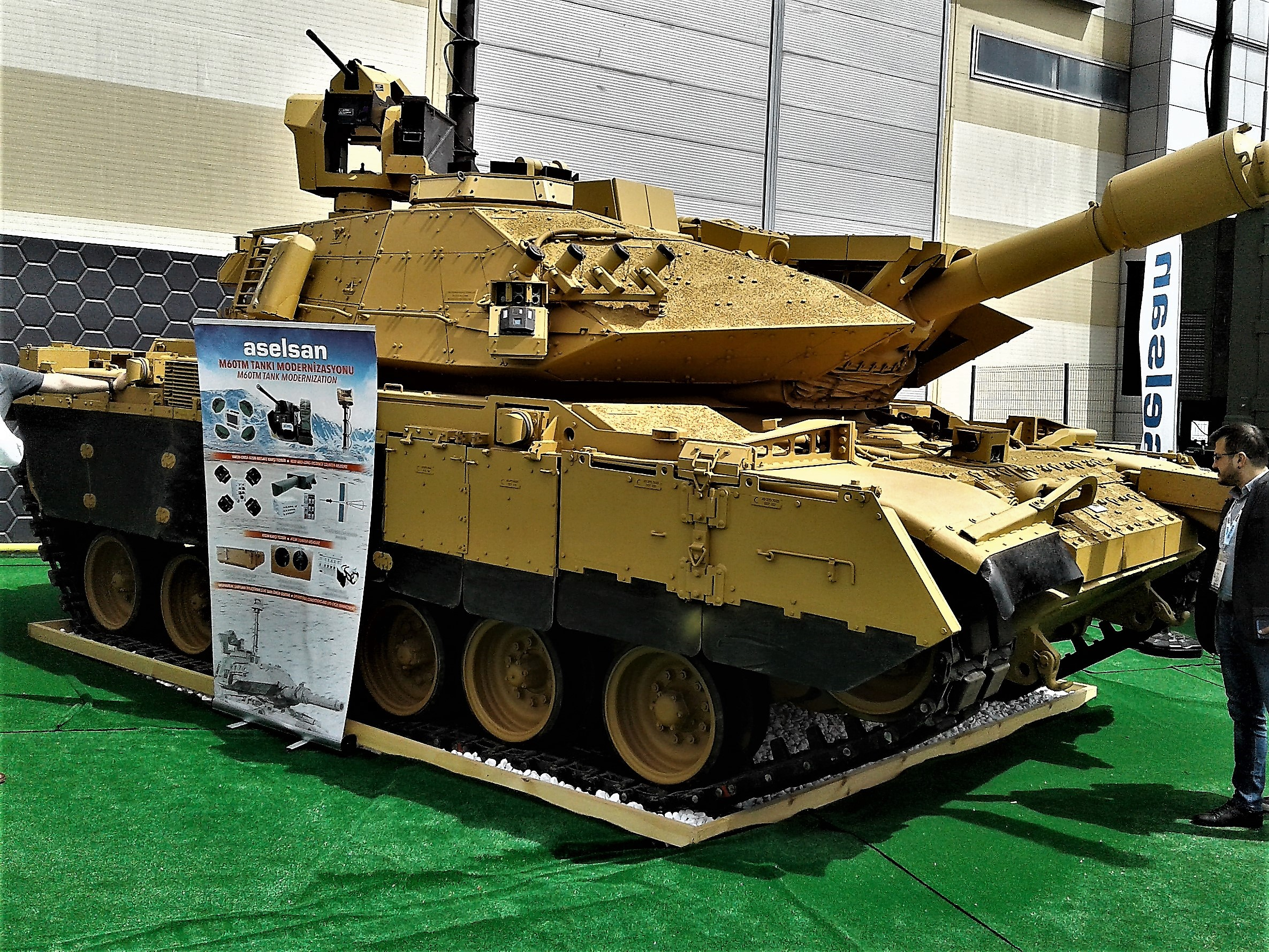
A Turkish Upgraded M60TM presenting by Aselsan

- High Performance/Super M60: Teledyne Continental upgrade package for the M60A1/A3 offered in 1985. Features 105-mm M68A1 gun, new engine and suspension system, Chobham spaced applique armor for the turret, and other component improvements. One prototype built.
- M60-2000/120S: M60/Abrams hybrid vehicle developed by General Dynamics Land Division in 2001. One prototype built.
- M60 Phoenix: Jordanian upgrade, carried out in 2004 by the King Abdullah II Design and Development Bureau. Upgrade features increased firepower (with a RUAG 120 mm smoothbore gun), IR jammers and modular armor protection scheme upgrade.
- Raytheon M60A3 SLEP: Raytheon modular update package for the M60A1/A3 first offered in 2016. Features RUAG 120-mm gun with autoloader, digital fire control system, STANAG level 6 armor plates for the hull, SLAT armor for the turret bustle, upgraded engine, and other component improvements.
- Royal Thai Army M60A3 TIFCS: The M60A3 main battle tank underwent a modernization led by Elbit Systems in 2015. This upgrade introduced essential features, including a Stabilized Thermal Sight (TIFCS) for enhanced day and night operations, an Electrical Gun & Turret Drive System (EGTDS), and a Head Mirror Assembly (HMA) for improved fire control. The tank's main armament, the M68 105 mm gun, was equipped with a new thermal sleeve. The Index Loader system allowed quicker and easier reloading. The modernized M60A3 demonstrated higher shooting accuracy.
- Leonardo M60A3 SLEP: M60A3 SLEP modular upgrade package offered by Leonardo DRS in 2017.
- Taiwanese M60A3 Update: In 2016, the National Chung-Shan Institute of Science and Technology (NCSIST) proposed a modernization plan for Taiwan's M60A3 TTS fleet at an estimated cost of NT$100 million per tank, featuring a 120 mm smoothbore cannon, updated turret hydraulic system, ballistic computer, and autoloader. However, due to high foreign procurement costs, the aging M60 hull, limited armor gains, and overall costs exceeding new M1A2 procurement, the project was canceled in 2018. Taiwanese 2019 SLEP modular update of the M60A3 in conjunction with Elbit Systems. Upgrades includes MG251/L44 120-mm gun with a semi-automatic load assist, Elbit Knight Independent Fire Control System (IFCS) with an independent thermal commander's sight, laser range finder, an RWR/IR warning system and Curtis-Wright electric turret drive. Improved hull suspension, improved NBC protection system and modular active and reactive armor packages. This proposal was also suspended in favor of a phased domestic upgrade initiative. In 2022, the Ministry of National Defense awarded NCSIST a NT$444.01 million contract to update the fire control, turret control, and sighting systems on 40 M60A3 tanks by October 2025, though this program was later paused. In 2023, a contract with U.S. manufacturer RENK America was announced to procure 460 new AVDS-1790-2CAU 950 hp engines and spare parts, with local Taiwanese suppliers assisting in production, set for completion by March 2028.
- M60-3105: Belgian modernized SLEP turret replacement unveiled at EDEX 2025 in Cairo. Egypt. Crew reduced to 3

== Specifications ==
	M60	M60A1	M60A2	M60A3
Overall length (gun forward)	366.5 in (9.3 m)	371.5 in (9.4 m)	288.7 in (7.3 m)	371.5 in (9.4 m)
Overall width	143 in (3.6 m)			
Height over cupola periscope	126.5 in (3.2 m)	128.2 in (3.3 m)	130.3 in (3.3 m)	129.2 in (3.3 m)
Ground clearance	15.3 in (38.9 cm)			
Top speed	30 mph (48 km/h)			
Fording	48 in (1.2 m) (w/o kit)			
Max. grade	60%			
Max. trench	8.5 ft (2.6 m)			
Max. wall	36 in (0.9 m)			
Range	300 mi (480 km)		280 mi (450 km)	
Power	750 hp (560 kW) at 2400 rpm			
Power-to-weight ratio	14.7 hp/ST (12.1 kW/t)	14.3 hp/ST (11.8 kW/t)	13.1 hp/ST (10.8 kW/t)	
Torque	1,710 lb⋅ft (2,320 N⋅m) at 1800 rpm			
Weight, combat loaded	102,000 lb (46,270 kg)	105,000 lb (47,630 kg)	114,000 lb (51,710 kg)	114,600 lb (51,980 kg)
Ground pressure	10.9 psi (75 kPa)	11.2 psi (77 kPa)	12.3 psi (85 kPa)	
Main armament	105 mm M68 (Note: The original configuration of the M60A1 used the M68 gun. M60A1 RISE Passive tanks built after 1977 were armed with the M68E1 variant of the gun. It had an improved ballistic drive to allow for accurate firing of APFSDS ammunition. Most M60A1 RISE tanks were retrofitted to this standard by applying the M60A1 PIP Turret Update Kit. This information comes from the 1980 M60A1. M60A1 RISE, and M60A1 RISE (Passive) System Update Assessment by the US Army PMO Logistics Management and from the Direct Support, General Support, and Depot Maintenance Manual for Cannon, 105-MM Gun, M68 & M68E1, M116 and 140 Mount TM 9-1000-213-35 by Fred C. (Chief of Staff) Weyand (1978))		152 mm M162 Gun/Launcher (including up to 13 missiles)	105 mm M68E1
Elevation, main gun	+19° −9°	+20° −10°		
Traverse rate	15 seconds/360°	16 seconds/360°	9.1 seconds/360°	16 seconds/360°
Elevation rate	4°/second		10°/second	4°/second
Main gun ammo	57 rounds	63 rounds	46 rounds	63 rounds
Firing rate	7 rounds/minute		4 rounds/minute	7 rounds/minute

== Operators ==
A map of M60 operators as of 2021 Current Former

=== Current operators ===
- Bosnia and Herzegovina: 45 M60A3 TTS transferred from the US in 1996 under the Train and Equip Program. They all remain in service as of 2023.
- Bahrain: 180 M60A3 TTS in 2005, 100 in service and 80 in storage as of 2023
- Brazil: 91 M60A3s purchased from the United States. 35 M60A3 TTS in service as of 2023
- Egypt: Received 700 M60A1 and 759 M60A3 from the United States, plus 168 from Austria. 300 M60A1 and 850 M60A3 in service as of 2023.
- Iran: 460 M60A1s were transferred from the US before 1979, with 150 in service as of 2023
- Israel: 1,350 M60, M60A1, M60A3, and various Magach models in 2005. They were replaced by the Merkava. As of 2023, Israel operates some AVLBs based on M60 hulls.
- Jordan: 182 M60A3 in service as of 2023.
- Lebanon: 10 M60A3s transferred from Jordan in 2008. 10 in service as of 2023
- Libya: 3 M60A1 transferred from Turkey.
- Morocco: 108 M60A1s transferred from US in 1981. 300 former US Marine Corps M60A1s were purchased from 1991 to 1994, 120 M60A3 TTS and 7 M60A1 in 1997. 220 M60A1 and 120 M60A3 TTS in service as of 2023
- Oman: 6 M60A1 and 73 M60A3 supplied by the United States between 1981 and 1996. As of 2023, they all remain in service.
- Saudi Arabia: 910 M60A1 RISE (250 transferred to North Yemen). Many of these were upgraded to M60A3s during the 1990s. 460 M60A3 in service in 2005, 370 M60A3 in 2023
- Singapore: 12 M60 AVLB in service as of 2023.
- Spain: 50 M60A1, 154 M60A3, and 106 M60A3 TTSs received between 1992 and 1993 from Conventional Forces in Europe (CFE) Treaty. Superseded by the Leopard 2. As of 2023, 15 M60 AVLB bridge layers are in service with the Spanish Army and M60CZ-10/25E "Alacran" combat engineer variant.
- Sudan: 20 M60A1s received in 1979 from the United States. They remain in service as of 2023.
- Taiwan: 460 M60A3 TTS and 450 CM11 Brave Tiger in service as of 2023.
- Thailand: 53 M60A1 and 125 M60A3 from the US Army. They all remain in service as of 2023.
- Tunisia: 54 M60A3 received from the United States between 1983 and 1984. 30 M60A1 and 54 M60A3 in service as of 2023.
- Turkey: Received 274 M60A1 and 658 M60A3 from the United States between 1992 and 1994; 170 were converted to M60T Sabra 3. 100 M60A1, 650 M60A3 TTS, and 165 M60TM Firat in service as of 2023.
- Yemen: 64 M60A1 RISE Passives delivered in the late 1970s. At least 50 were in service in 2005. Unknown number still in service as of 2023.

=== Former operators ===
- Argentina: One M60A1 acquired in the early 1970s from the United States. Never placed in service. As of March 2014 it is displayed as a monument in the Army NCOs School, in Campo de Mayo, outside Buenos Aires.
- Austria: 170 M60A1s purchased from USAEUR excesses 1982. Later converted to A3 standard by 1991 and notably used for border patrol duties during the Slovene Ten-Day War; they were replaced in 1997 by the Leopard 2 and sold to Egypt.
- Ethiopia: 180 M60A1s received from the US from 1974 to 1977. Replaced with the T-72 in 1978 and 1979.
- West Germany: One standard M60 was acquired from the United States for use in comparative trials against a pre-series Leopard 1 in 1964.
- Greece: 357 M60A1 RISE and 312 M60A3 TTS were received under the Conventional Forces in Europe (CFE) Treaty in 1991 and 1992. Retired from service 2015 and remaining M60s to be scrapped.
- Iraq: Limited ad hoc use of Iranian tanks during Iran–Iraq War. Six Iranian M60A1s were captured in 1980 and transferred to Jordan. Any remaining tanks were destroyed after the war. It was never officially in Iraqi service.
- Italy: 200 M60A1s produced in Italy and 100 from excess USAEUR stocks in the late 1970s. Phased out of service by 2008.
- Portugal: 96 M60A3 TTS tanks from redundant US Army inventory in Europe in 1991 and 1992 as a result of the CFE Treaty. Were formally phased out in 2018 and replaced by the Leopard 2 A6.
- United States: The M60 series was retired from combat use in 1991, the Army National Guard in 1997, as a training aid in 2005 and target use in 2024. The M728 Combat Engineer Vehicle was retired from combat use in 2000. 262 M728s were in service with the US Army Reserve and Army National Guard as of 2007. Phased replacement with the M1150 Assault Breacher Vehicle started 2018. 230 M60 AVLB vehicles were in service with the US Army, and 30 M60 AVLB vehicles in service with US Marine Corps as of 2023. Replaced with the M1074 Joint Assault Bridge starting in 2019.

== See also ==
- G-numbers: (SNL G292)
- Gun data computer
- 1982 Mannheim attack: Charles S. Keefer, a US Army soldier, stole an M60 tank and drove it uncontrollably into the Mannheim city center.
- San Diego tank rampage: Rampage in Clairemont, San Diego, in a stolen M60A3.
- List of main battle tanks by generation
