= Timeline of the British Army since 2000 =

The Time line of the British Army since 2000, lists the conflicts and wars the British Army were involved in.

- Sierra Leone Civil War (2000)
- Yugoslav wars (ended 2001)
- Iraq War (2003–2011)
- War in Afghanistan (2001-2021)
- War on terror (2001–present)
- Military intervention against the Islamic State of Iraq and the Levant (2014– 9 December 2017)
- Iraqi Civil War (2014–2017)
- Mosul offensive (2015)
- Mosul offensive (2016)
  - Battle of Mosul (2016–2017)

== See also ==
- Timeline of the British Army
- Timeline of the British Army 1700–1799
- Timeline of the British Army 1800–1899
- Timeline of the British Army 1900–1999
