= Timeline of the British Army 1800–1899 =

This Timeline of the British Army 1800–1899 lists the conflicts and wars the British Army were involved in.

- French Revolutionary Wars ended 1802
- Second Anglo-Maratha War 1803–1805
- Napoleonic Wars 1802–1813
- War of 1812 1812–1815
- Hundred Days 1815 (The return of Napoleon Bonaparte)
- Anglo-Nepalese War 1813–1816
- Third Anglo-Maratha War 1817–1818
- 5th Frontier War 1818
- First Ashanti War 1823–1831
- First Anglo-Burmese War 1824–1826
- First Anglo-Afghan War 1839–1842
- First Opium War 1839–1842
- First Anglo-Sikh War 1845–1846
- New Zealand Wars 1845–1872
- Second Anglo-Sikh War 1848–1849
- Second Anglo-Burmese War 1852–1853
- Crimean War 1853–1856
- Anglo-Persian War 1856–1857
- Second Opium War 1856–1860
- Indian Rebellion 1857–1858
- Second Ashanti War 1863–1864
- Bhutan War 1864–1865
- Third Ashanti War 1873–1874
- Second Anglo-Afghan War 1878–1880
- Anglo-Zulu War 1879
- First Boer War 1880–1881
- Third Anglo-Burmese War 1885
- Mahdist War 1881–1899
- Fourth Ashanti War 1894
- Anglo-Zanzibar War 1896 (The shortest war in recorded history, which only lasted approximately 38 minutes)
- Six-Day War 1899
- Boxer Rebellion 1899–1901
- Second Boer War 1899–1902

== See also ==
- Timeline of the British Army
- Timeline of the British Army 1700–1799
- Timeline of the British Army 1900–1999
- Timeline of the British Army since 2000
