= Baretle =

- Town
- Location in Iraq
- Coordinates: 36°20′59″N 43°22′43″E
- Country: Iraq
- Governorate: Ninawa

Baretle is a village outside of Mosul, Iraq near Bashiqah mountain.

During the War in Iraq, the village was controlled by ISIS forces. By 2017, with the retaking of Mosul the otherwise insignificant village had become the frontline, in the ongoing conflict.
