= British Army during the American Revolutionary War =

The British Army during the American Revolutionary War served for eight years of armed conflict, fought in eastern North America, the Caribbean, and elsewhere from April 19, 1775 until the treaty ending the war, September 3, 1783. Britain had no European allies in the war, which was initially between Great Britain and American insurgents in the Thirteen Colonies. The war widened when the American insurgents made a formal alliance with France (1778) and gained the aid of France's ally Spain (1779).

In June 1775, the Second Continental Congress, gathered in present-day Independence Hall in the revolutionary capital of Philadelphia, appointed George Washington commander-in-chief of the Continental Army, which the Congress organized by uniting and organizing patriot militias into a single army under the command of Washington, who led it in its eight-year war against the British Army. The following year, in July 1776, the Second Continental Congress, representing the Thirteen Colonies, unanimously adopted the Declaration of Independence, an iconic and historical document largely written by Thomas Jefferson, addressed to King George III, which articulated why the delegates to the Congress felt were declaring themselves free and independent from the Kingdom of Great Britain. Adoption of the Declaration served to both inspire the cause of independence in the Thirteen Colonies and also formalized and escalated the Revolutionary War.

For several years, the outcome of the war was uncertain and indecisive. But on October 19, 1781, the British Army was defeated at the Siege of Yorktown by a combined Franco-American force supported by the French navy, led the British to conclude that the war in North America could not be won, forcing them to forfeit the Thirteen Colonies in eastern North America in the Treaty of Paris, which they signed in 1783, though sporadic fighting continued for several additional years.

When the American Revolutionary War commenced, the British Army was a volunteer force that had suffered from a lack of peacetime spending and ineffective recruitment in the decade since the Seven Years' War. In 1776, to offset this deficiency, the British Crown hastily hired German Hessian mercenary contingents, who supplemented their fighting capabilities and served with regular British units for the rest of the war. In 1778, limited army impressment was introduced in England and Scotland to bolster the army's size, but the practice proved unpopular and was suspended until being reintroduced two years later, in 1780.

The attrition of constant fighting, the decision by the Kingdom of France to ultimately lend considerable naval and army support to the cause of American independence, and the withdrawal of a sizable number of British forces from North America in 1778 were all factors in the British Army's ultimate defeat. At Yorktown in 1781, the British Army, then led by Charles Cornwallis, was forced to surrender, contributing to the Whigs gaining control of a parliamentary majority, which brought offensive British military operations in North America to an end.

== Structure and recruitment ==
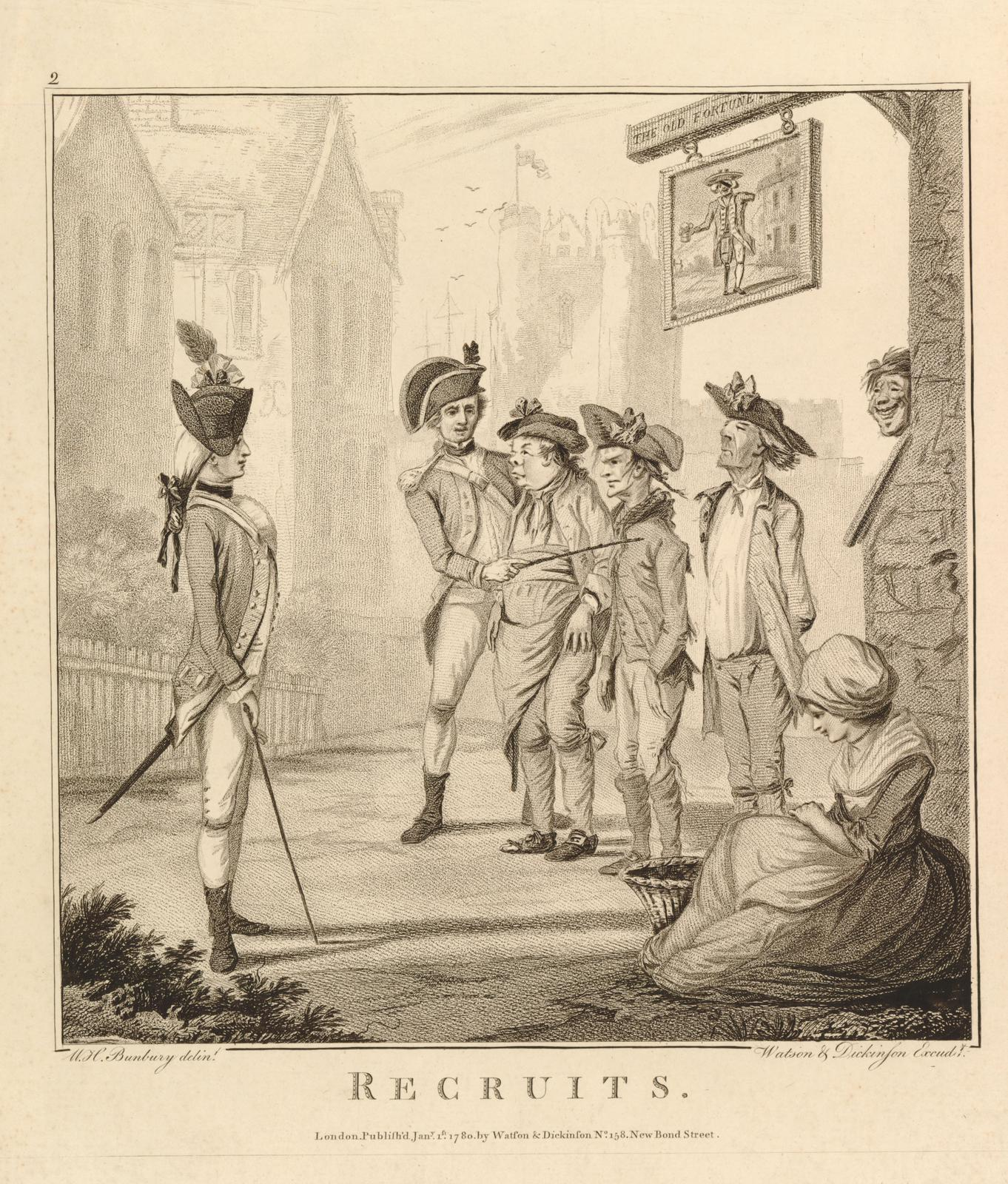
1780 illustration of British Army recruits

Britain had incurred a large national debt fighting the Seven Years' War, during which the armies' establishment strength had been increased to an unprecedented size. With the ascension of peace in 1763 the army was dramatically reduced to a peacetime home establishment of just over 11,000 men, with a further 9,750 for the Irish establishment and 10,000 for the colonies. This meant 20 regiments of infantry totaling just over 11,000 men were stationed in Great Britain, 21 regiments were stationed in Ireland, 18 regiments were stationed in the Americas, and 7 regiments were stationed in Gibraltar. Alongside this, the army could call on 16 regiments of the cavalrymen and 2,712 men in the artillery. This gave a theoretical strength of just over 46,000 men exclusive of the artillery. The British government deemed this troop strength to be inadequate to prosecute an insurrection in the Americas, as well as deal with defence of the rest of its territories. Treaties with German states (mainly Hesse-Kassel and Brunswick) were negotiated for a further 18,000 men half of which were stationed in garrisons to release regular British units from other theaters. This measure brought the Army's total establishment strength to around 55,000 men.

Parliament suffered chronic difficulties in obtaining sufficient manpower, and found it impossible to fill the quotas they had set. The Army was a deeply unpopular profession with one contentious issue being pay. A private infantryman was paid a wage of just 8d. per day, the same pay as for a New Model Army infantryman 130 years earlier. The rate of pay in the army was insufficient to meet the rising costs of living which did not help entice potential recruits, as service was nominally for life.

To increase voluntary enrollment, Parliament offered a bounty of £1.10s for every recruit. As the war dragged on, Parliament became desperate for manpower; criminals were offered military service to escape legal penalties, and deserters were pardoned if they re-joined their units. (Note: After the defeat at Saratoga, Parliament doubled the bounty to £3, and increased it again the following year, to £3.3s, as well as expanding the age limit from 17–45 to 16–50 years of age.)

Impressment, essentially conscription by the "press gang", was a favored recruiting method, though it was unpopular with the public, leading many to enlist in local militias to avoid regular service. Attempts were made to draft such levies, much to the chagrin of the militia commanders. Competition between naval and army press gangs, and even between rival ships or regiments, frequently resulted in brawls between the gangs in order to secure recruits for their unit. Men would maim themselves to avoid the press gangs, while many deserted at the first opportunity. Pressed men were militarily unreliable; regiments with large numbers of such men were deployed to remote garrisons such as Gibraltar or the West Indies, to make it harder to desert.

After the losses at the Battles of Saratoga and the outbreak of hostilities with France and Spain, the existing voluntary enlistment measures were judged to be insufficient. Between 1775 and 1781, the regular army increased from 48,000 to 121,000. In 1778 the army adopted some non traditional recruiting measures to further augment its strength, a system of private subscription was established, whereby some 12 new regiments totaling 15,000 men were raised by individual towns and nobles.

The same year, the government passed the first of two recruiting acts which allowed a limited form of impressment in parts of England and Scotland under strict conditions, however the measure proved unpopular and both acts were repealed in May 1780, permanently discontinuing impressment in the army. The recruiting acts of 1778 and 1779 also provided greater incentives for voluntarily joining the regular army, including a bounty of £3 and the entitlement to discharge after three years unless the nation remained at war. Thousands of volunteer militia battalions were raised for home defence in Ireland and England, and some of the most competent of these were embodied to the regular army. The British government took a further step by releasing criminals and debtors from prison on the condition they joined the army. Three entire regiments were raised from this early release program.

In November 1778 the establishment was set at 121,000 men, of whom 24,000 were foreigners, along with 40,000 embodied militia, for a total of 161,000 men. This was raised the next year to 104,000 men on the British establishment, 23,000 on the Irish establishment, 25,000 Hessians, and 42,000 embodied militia, for a total force of about 194,000 men.

=== Leadership ===
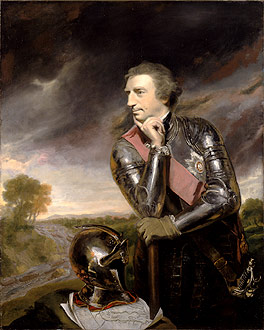
Field Marshal Jeffery Amherst, Commander-in-Chief of the Forces from 1778 to 1782

The Commander-in-Chief, India formally held command over crown forces in the East Indies and the Commander-in-Chief, North America commanded crown forces in the Americas. However, the British Army had no formal command structure, so British commanders often worked on their own initiative during the war. The position of Commander-in-Chief of the Forces remained vacant until 1778 when it was given to Jeffery Amherst, 1st Baron Amherst who held it until the end of the war. However, his role in advising the government on strategy was limited and Amherst found himself primarily occupied with the organisation of home forces to oppose the threatened invasion in 1779, and suppress the outbreak of severe anti-Catholic rioting in 1780.

The direction of the British war effort ultimately fell to the Secretary of State for the Colonies, George German. Despite holding no formal position in the army, he appointed or relieved generals, took care of provisions and supplies, and directed much of the strategic planning. While some historians argue that Sackville performed effectively and even brilliantly, others argue that he made several miscalculations and struggled to hold genuine authority over his subordinates in the army.

==== The officer corps ====
Although a large portion of the rank and file were lower class and the officers upper class, the army of the mid-1700s recruited officers from a variety of social backgrounds. Officers in British service could purchase commissions to ascend the ranks, and the practice was common in the Army. Values of commissions varied but were usually in line with social and military prestige; for example, regiments such as the Guards commanded the highest prices. (Note: The lower ranks often regarded the treatment to high-ranking commissions by wealthier officers as "plums for consumption".)

Wealthy individuals lacking any formal military education or practical experience often found their way into positions of high responsibility, diluting the effectiveness of a regiment. (Note: Royal authority had forbidden the practice since 1711, but it was still permitted for infants to hold commissions. Young boys were taken from their schooling, often orphans of deceased wealthy officers, and placed in positions of responsibility within regiments.) However, according to Reid, the Georgian army through necessity drew its officers from a far wider base than its later Victorian counterpart and was much more open to promotion from the ranks. Officers were required to be literate, but there was no formal requirement on the level of education or their social standing, and most regimental officers did not come from the landed gentry, but from middle class private individuals in search of a career. The system of sale of commissions which officially governed the selection and promotion of officers was, in practice, considerably relaxed during wartime, with far more stringent requirements placed on promotion. Many British officers were professional soldiers rather than wealthy dilettantes and showed themselves ready to discard their drill manuals and use innovative methods and tactics.

British officers were heavy drinkers. William Howe was said to have seen many "crapulous mornings" while campaigning in New York. John Burgoyne drank heavily on a nightly basis towards the end of the Saratoga campaign. The two generals were also reported to have found solace with the wives of subordinate officers to ease the stressful burdens of command. During the Philadelphia campaign, British officers deeply offended local Quakers by entertaining their mistresses in the houses where they had been quartered.

==== British commands in America ====
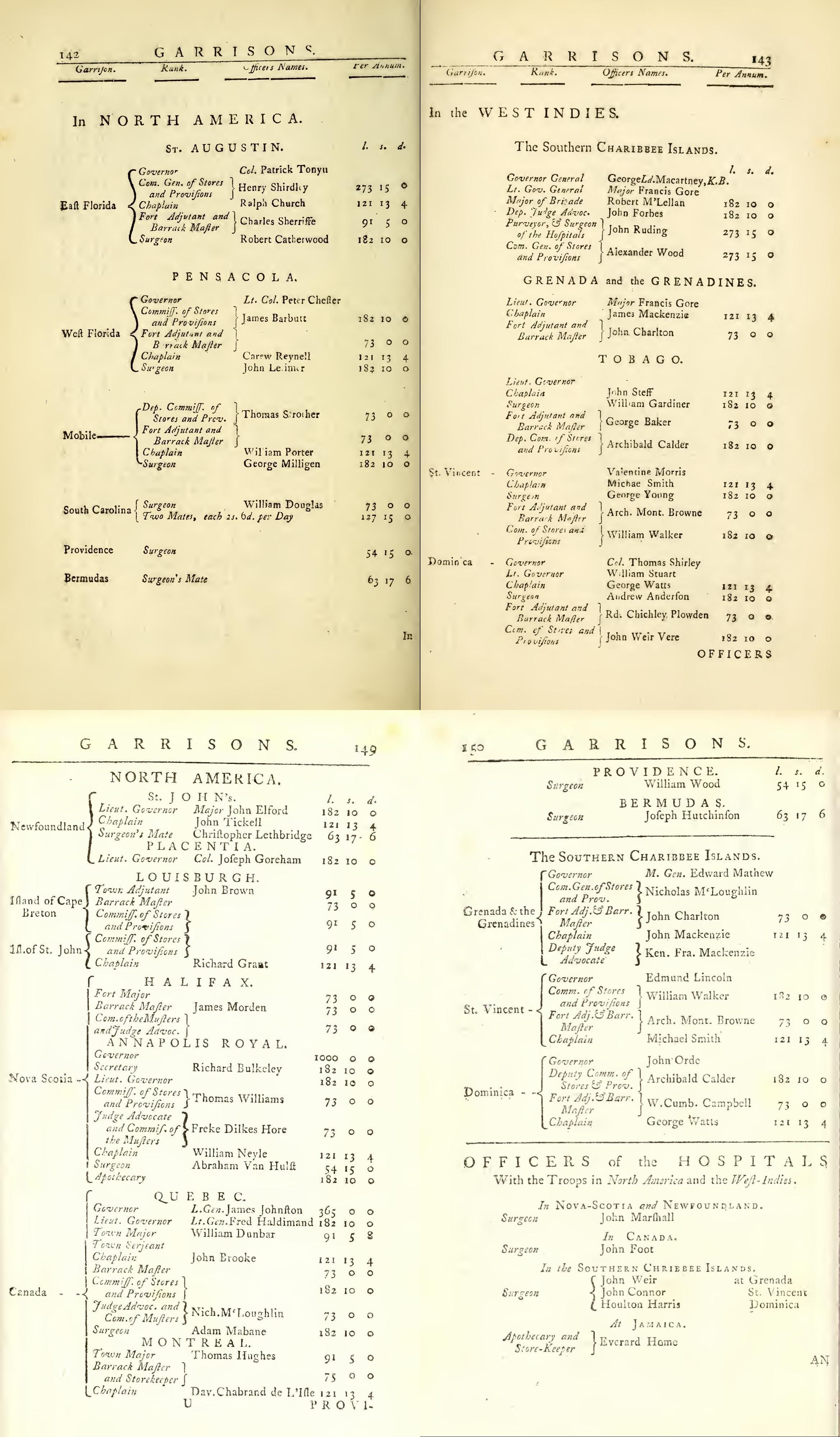
Military governors and staff officers in British America and the West Indies in 1778 and 1784

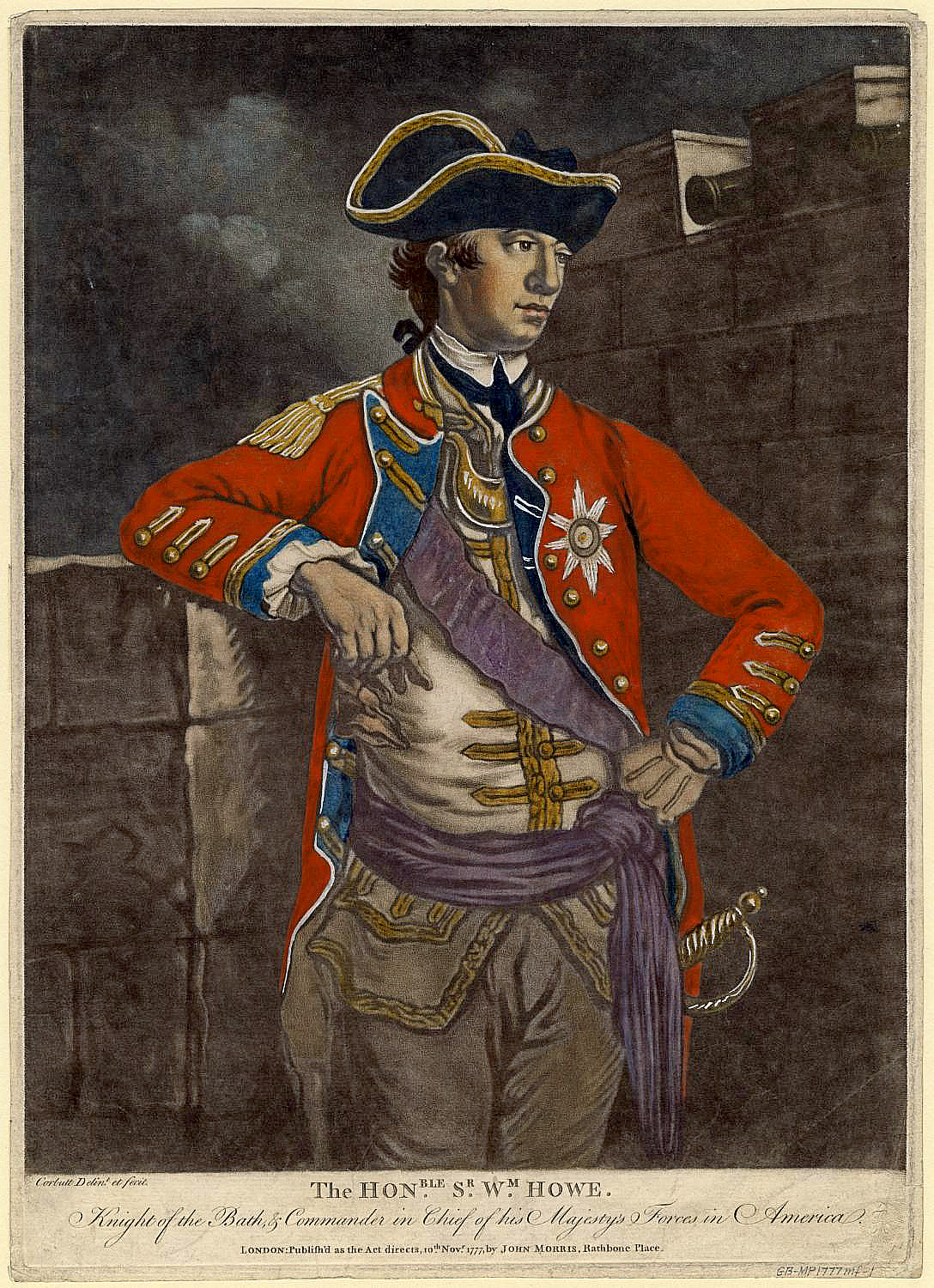
Sir William Howe, British Commander from 1775 to 1778

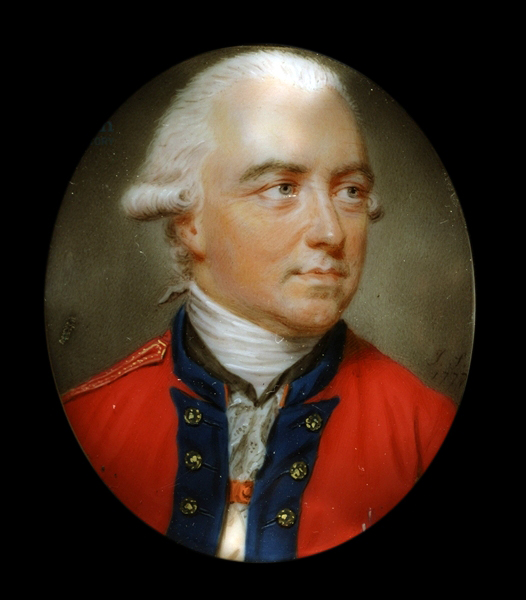
Sir Henry Clinton, British Commander from 1778 to 1782

In 1776, there were 119 generals of various grades in the British Army. However, since generals never retired, perhaps a third of this number were too old or infirm to command in the field. Others were opposed to war against the colonists or unwilling to serve for years in North America. Britain had a difficult time appointing a determined senior military leadership in America. Thomas Gage, Commander-in-Chief of North America at the outbreak of the war, was criticized for being too lenient on the rebellious colonists. Jeffrey Amherst was appointed Commander-in-Chief of the Forces in 1778, but he refused a direct command in America because he was unwilling to take sides in the war. Admiral Augustus Keppel similarly opposed a command: "I cannot draw the sword in such a cause". The Earl of Effingham resigned his commission when his regiment was posted to America, while William Howe and John Burgoyne were opposed to military solutions to the crisis. Howe and Henry Clinton both stated that they were unwilling participants and were only following orders.

Sir William Howe, who was chosen to succeed Sir Thomas Gage as Commander in Chief in North America, was only 111th in seniority. Gage and Howe had both served as light infantry commanders in America during the French and Indian War. However, Gage was blamed for underestimating the strength of republican sympathy and was relieved in 1776. Howe had the advantage of large numbers of reinforcements, and was the brother of Admiral Richard Howe, the Royal Navy's commander in chief in America. The two brothers gained much success in 1776, but failed to destroy Washington's Army. They also tried to initiate peace talks but these came to nothing.

In 1777, General John Burgoyne was allowed to mount an ambitious campaign southward from present-day Canada. After early success, he pushed ahead despite major supply difficulties, and was surrounded and forced to capitulate at Saratoga, an event which precipitated intervention by Britain's European rivals. Unlike his Philadelphia campaign the same year, in which the British Army captured and occupied the revolutionary capital of Philadelphia, Howe failed to achieve decisive results in present-day New York state. He was recalled and replaced by Sir Henry Clinton.

Clinton was regarded as one of the most studious and well-read experts on tactics and strategy. However, even before becoming commander in chief, he had been reluctant to succeed Howe. He took command when the widening of the war compelled him to relinquish troops to other theatres, and became embittered at the Government's demands that he bring the war to a successful conclusion with fewer troops and resources than had been available to Howe. He repeatedly tried to resign, and quarrelled with the Navy's commanders and his own subordinates.

While Clinton held New York, Lord Cornwallis conducted a largely separate campaign in the southern states. Cornwallis was one of the most aristocratic of the British generals who served in America, but had been dedicated to a military career since an early age, and insisted on sharing his soldiers' hardships. After early victories, he was unable to destroy the American Continental armies opposing him or to raise substantial loyalist support. On Clinton's orders, he tried to create a fortified enclave on the Chesapeake coast, but was cut off by a French fleet and forced to surrender at the Siege of Yorktown, which signalled the end of effective British attempts to retake America.

The final effective British commander in chief in America was Sir Guy Carleton, who had defended Quebec in 1775, but had been passed over in favour of Burgoyne in 1777 as a result of his perceived over-caution. As commander in chief, his main concern was to secure the safety of the many Loyalists and former slaves in the British enclave in New York.

Carleton successfully administered British removal from the American seaboard, beginning with the July 1782 withdrawal from Savannah to Charleston, and the subsequent evacuations of Charleston, South Carolina in December 1782 and New York City in November 1783. At the 1783 Anglo-Spanish Treaty of Versailles, Britain turned Florida back to Spain, and the Royal Navy administered another mass migration of Loyalists to Bahamas, Jamaica, and Great Britain.

=== Strength ===
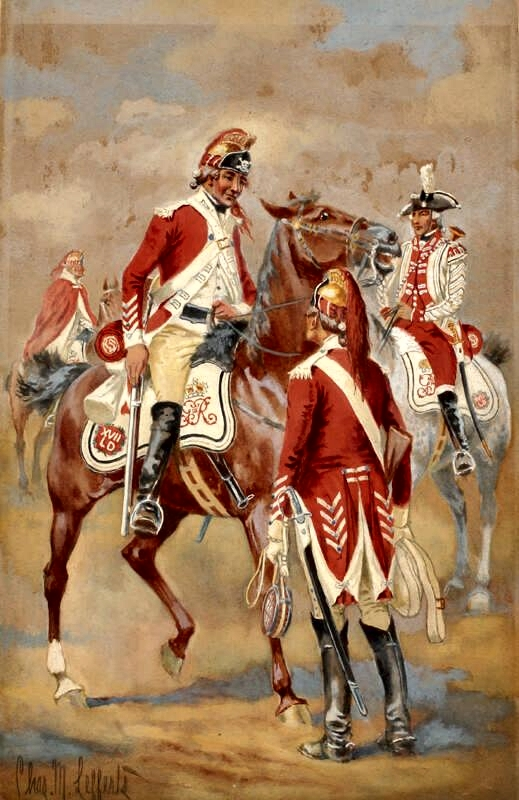
The 17th Light Dragoons during the war

The following is the British Army's strength based on Lord North's reports. These figures exclude the Irish establishment, Hanoverians, militia, and the East India Company's private army. The totals in North America specifically are listed in parentheses.

- April 1775: 27,063 (6,991)
- March 1776: 45,130 (14,374)
- August 1777: 57,637 (23,694)
- October 1778: 112,239 (52,561)
- July 1779: 131,691 (47,624)
- September 1780: 147,152 (44,554)
- September 1781: 149,282 (47,301)
- March 1782: 150,310 (47,223)

A detailed order of battle for British Army forces in North America circa October 1778 is as follows (about one-third of its then-strength is discounted due to disease, desertion, and other causes; the listed troops are solely effectives):

- New York garrison (17,452 effectives)
  - 16th and 17th Light Dragoons (two regiments)
  - Guards (two battalions)
  - Light Infantry (two battalions)
  - Grenadiers (two battalions)
  - 7th, 17th, 23rd, 26th, 33rd, 37th, 42nd, 44th, 57th, 63rd, and 64th Foot regiments
  - Six provincial regiments/battalions
  - Queen's Rangers regiment
  - 13 Hessian regiments plus Jäger
- Expedition for West Indies (5,147 effectives)
  - 4th, 5th, 15th, 27th, 28th, 35th, 40th, 46th, 49th, and 55th Foot regiments
- Embarked for East Florida (3,657 effectives)
  - 71st Foot regiment
  - Five provincial regiments/battalions
  - Two Hessian regiments
- Embarked for West Florida (1,102 effectives)
  - Two provincial regiments
  - Waldeck regiment
- Embarked for Halifax (646 effectives)
  - One provincial regiment
  - One Hessian regiment
- Rhode Island garrison (5,740 effectives)
  - 22nd, 38th, 43rd, and 54th Foot regiments
  - Two provincial regiments
  - Four Hessian and two Anspach regiments

== Infantry ==
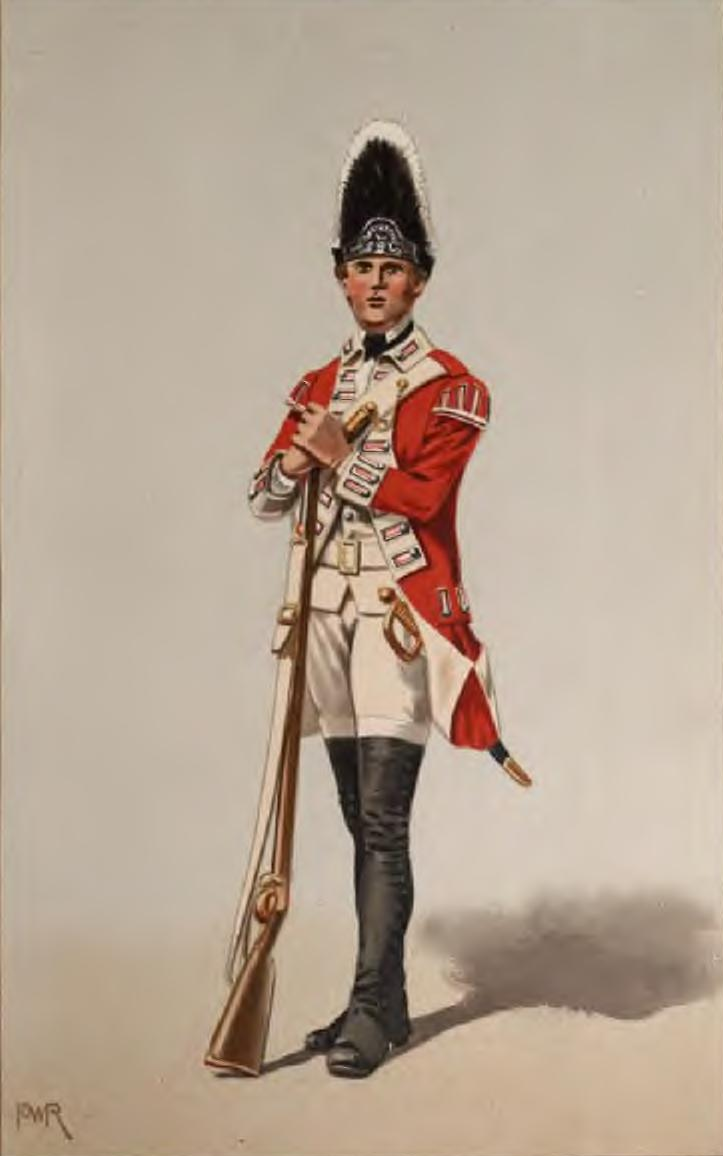
A grenadier of the 40th Regiment of Foot in 1767

Infantry formed the backbone of crown forces throughout the war. Two of the most heavily engaged infantry regiments, the 23rd and the 33rd, earned enduring reputations for their competence and professionalism in the field.

In the middle of the eighteenth century, the Army's uniforms were highly elaborate, and maneuvers were ponderous and slow, with "innumerable words of command." Experience of the conditions and terrain in North America during the French and Indian War prompted changes to its tactics and dress.

In battle the redcoats usually formed in two ranks rather than three, to increase mobility and firepower. The Army further adapted this formation during the American Revolution by forming and fighting in looser ranks, a tactic that was known as "loose files and American scramble". Soldiers stood at a greater distance apart and three "orders" were used to specify the distance to be expanded or contracted as necessary; "order" (two intervals), "open order" (four intervals), and "extended order" (ten intervals). British infantry advanced at the 'Trott' and fought fluid battles primarily using the bayonet. Although this new formation increased the British army's mobility and tactical flexibility, the abandonment of linear formation was later blamed by some British officers for defeats in the later stages of the war, like the Battle of Cowpens, in which British troops engaged denser bodies of men deployed in successive lines.

The hired German regiments, the Hessians, joined Howe's army in 1776 also adopted the two rank formation used by the British army, but retained the traditional close order system of fighting throughout the war.

=== Light infantry ===
In 1758, Thomas Gage (then a lieutenant colonel) had formed an experimental light infantry regiment known as 80th Regiment of Light-Armed Foot, considered to be the first such unit to serve in the British Army. Other officers, notably George Howe, the elder brother of William Howe, had adapted their regiments to serve as light infantry on their own initiative. On becoming commander-in-chief in North America in 1758, General Jeffery Amherst ordered every regiment to form light infantry companies from their ranks. The 80th regiment was disbanded in 1764 and the other ad-hoc light infantry units were converted back to "line" units, but infantry regiments retained their light companies until the mid-nineteenth century.

In 1771 and 1772, the British army began implementing a new training scheme for light infantry companies. Much of the early training was found to be inadequate, with officers unsure how to use light companies. Many of the brightest young officers of light companies sought commissions elsewhere because being a "light-bob" officer lacked social prestige.

In 1772, General George Townshend, 1st Marquess Townshend wrote Instructions, and Training and Equipping of the new Light Companies which was issued to regiments on the Irish establishment and offered a practical guide for training light companies and guidance for tactics such as skirmishing in broken terrain when acting independently, in sections or in large groups. Townshend also introduced a new communication method for light infantry officers when in command of loosely deployed, scattered troops; whistle signals rather than drums would indicate movements such as advance, retire, extend or contract.

In 1774, William Howe wrote the Manual for Light Infantry Drill and formed an experimental Light Infantry battalion trained at Salisbury camp. This became the pattern for all regular light infantry serving in North America. Howe's system differed in that it focused on development of composite battalions of light infantry more suited to large scale campaigning in North America, rather than individual companies. On taking command in America, Howe gave orders that every regiment which had not already done so to form a company of light infantry. These men were generally hand picked from the fittest and most proficient of the rank and file.

The light infantry companies of several regiments were usually combined in composite light infantry battalions. Similar composite battalions were often formed from the grenadier companies of line regiments. Grenadiers were historically chosen from the tallest soldiers, but as with light infantry companies, were often selected from among the most proficient soldiers in their parent units.

=== Tactics ===
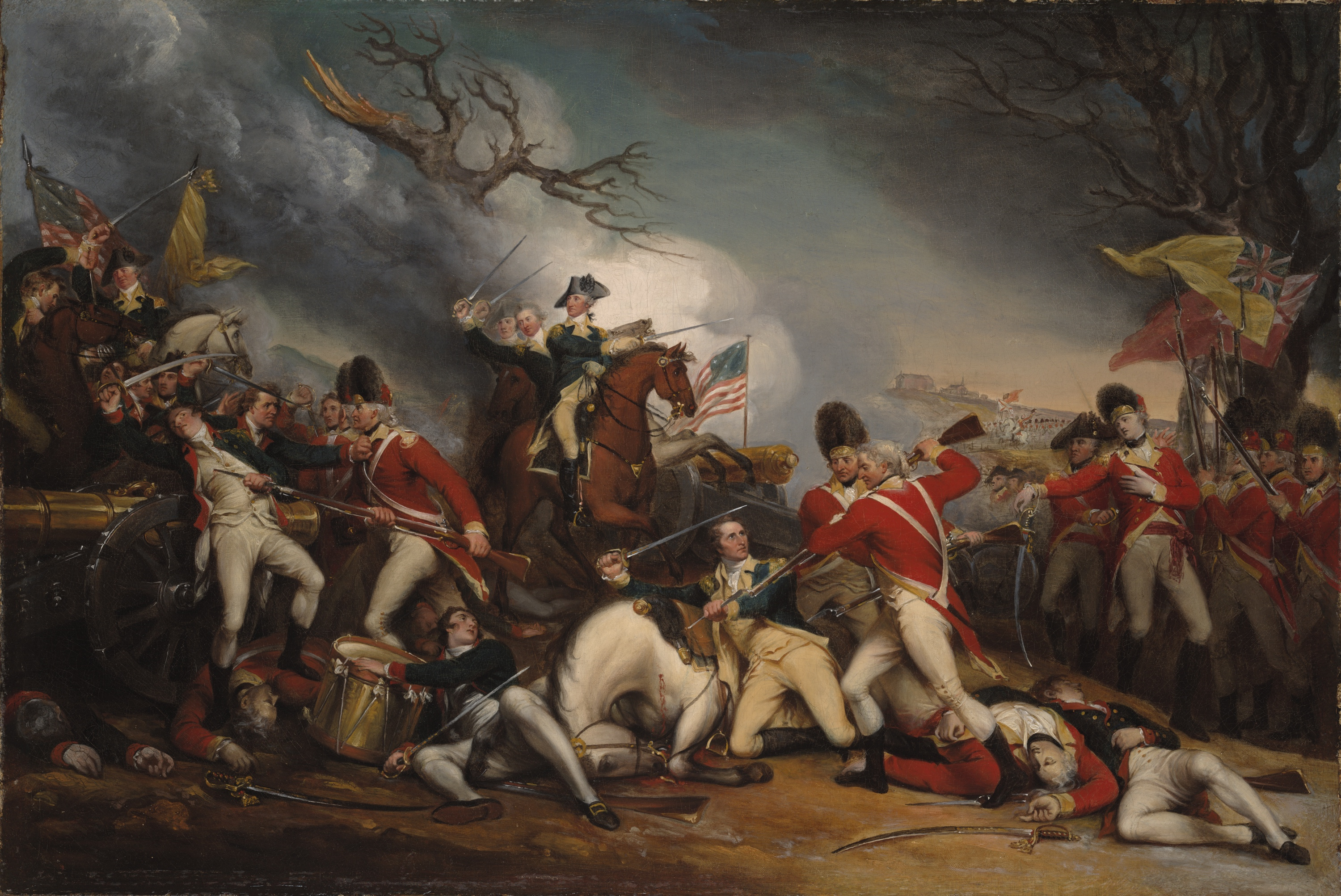
The British Army's bayonet charge during the Battle of Princeton depicted in a portrait by John Trumbull

At the Battle of Vigie Point in 1778 a force of British infantry who were veterans of colonial fighting inflicted heavy casualties on a far larger force of regular French troops who advanced in columns.

Clayton describes how "...the use of light infantry, well led by their officers and NCOs, was of key importance in advance as skirmishers fired on French columns from behind cover; when the French attempted to extend they were threatened with bayonet charge... and when the French advanced they fell back to prepare for further skirmishing and ambushes from all directions."

Fortescue similarly describes the action: "Advancing in skirmish order and keeping themselves always under cover, the light companies maintained at close range the most destructive fire on the Heavy French columns... At last one of the enemy's battalions fairly gave way and the light companies followed them to complete the rout with the bayonet".

=== Loyalists ===
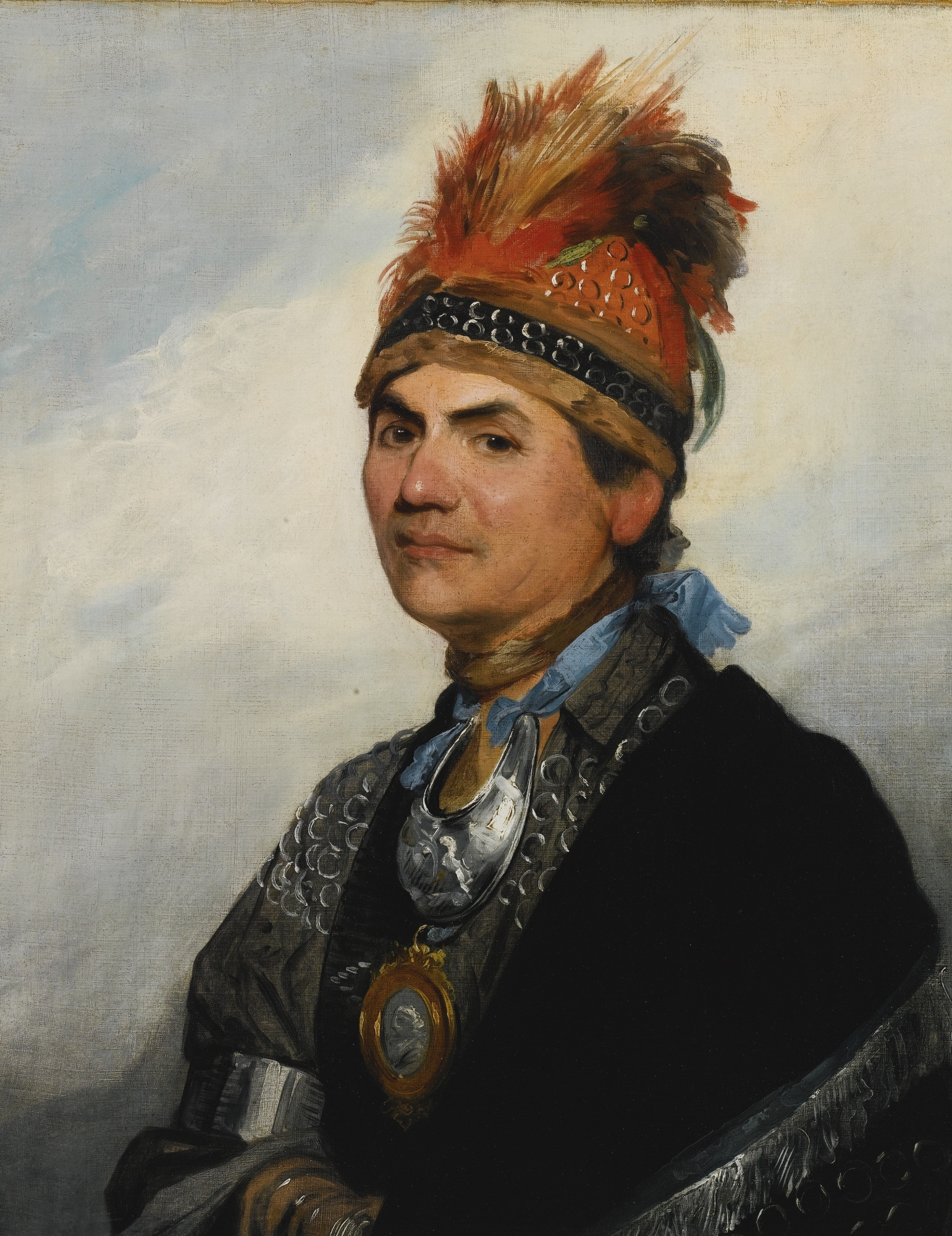
Joseph Brant, who led Native Americans and Loyalists in the north

Large numbers of scouts and skirmishers were also formed from loyalists and Native Americans. The renowned Robert Rogers formed the Queen's Rangers, while his brother James Rogers led the King's Rangers. Loyalist pioneer John Butler raised the provincial regiment known as Butler's Rangers, who were heavily engaged in the Northern colonies during which they were accused of participating in Indian led-massacres at Wyoming and Cherry Valley.

The majority of Native Americans favoured the British cause and Mohawk leader Joseph Brant commanded Iroquois and Loyalists in campaigns on the New York Frontier. Colonel Thomas Brown led another group of King's Rangers in the Southern colonies, defending East Florida from invasion, raiding the southern frontier and participating in the conquest of the southern colonies. Colonial Governor John Murray, 4th Earl of Dunmore raised a regiment composed entirely of freed slaves known as the Ethiopian Regiment, which served through the early skirmishes of the war.

The loyalist units were vital to the British primarily for their knowledge of local terrain. One of the most successful of these units was formed by an escaped slave, and veteran of the Ethiopian Regiment known as Colonel Tye, who led the so-called Black Brigade in numerous raids in New York and New Jersey, interrupting supply lines, capturing rebel officers, and killing suspected leaders. He died from wounds in 1780.

=== Uniform and equipment ===
The standard uniform of the British army consisted of the traditional red coat with cocked hats, white breeches and black gaiters with leather knee caps. Hair was usually cut short or fixed in plaits at the top of the head. As the war progressed, many line regiments replaced their cocked hats with slouch hats. The full "marching order" a line infantryman was expected to carry on campaign was extensive, and British soldiers often dropped much of their equipment before battle. Soldiers were also issued with greatcoats to be worn in adverse conditions, which were often used as tents or blankets. Drummers usually wore colours in reverse of their regimental colour, they carried the coat of arms of their colonel and wore mitre caps. Most German regiments wore dark blue coats, while cavalry and loyalists often wore green.

Grenadiers often wore bearskin headdress and usually carried hangers, a type of curved sword, as a side arm. Light infantry were issued with short coats, without lace, with an ammunition box containing nine cartridges lined up in a row for easy access worn across the stomach rather than at the side. They did not use bayonets but carried naval boarding axes.

The most common infantry weapon was the Brown Bess used with a fixed bayonet. However, some of the light companies were issued with the short barrel muskets or the Pattern 1776 rifle. The British army also conducted limited experimental use of the breech-loading Ferguson rifle, which proved too difficult to mass-produce to be used more extensively.

Major Patrick Ferguson formed a small experimental company of riflemen armed with this weapon, but this was disbanded in 1778. In many instances, British forces relied on Jagers from among the German contingents to provide skirmishers armed with rifles.

=== Colours ===
British infantry regiments possessed two flags: the King's Colour (the Union flag) and their regimental colour, which displayed colour of the regiment's facings. In 18th and 19th century warfare 'the colours' often became a rallying point in the most bitter actions. Both regimental standards were highly regarded and a source of pride each regiment. However, because of the tactical constraints in conducting the war and the adapted mode of fighting, it is likely that British regiments only used their colours for ceremonial purposes in America, particularly the armies commanded by Howe and Cornwallis.

In the early years of the war, however, the Hessians continued to carry their colours on campaign. Major-General Baron Friedrich Wilhelm von Lossberg wrote, "They [the British] have their colours with them only when quartered, while we carry them with us wherever the regiments go... the country is bad for fighting. Nothing worries me more than the colours, for the regiments cannot stay together in an attack because of the many walls, swamps, and stone cliffs. The English cannot lose their colours, for they do not carry them with them." During the Saratoga campaign Baroness Riedesel, the wife of a German officer, saved the colours of the Brunswick regiments by burning the staffs and hiding the flags in her mattress.

=== Daily life ===
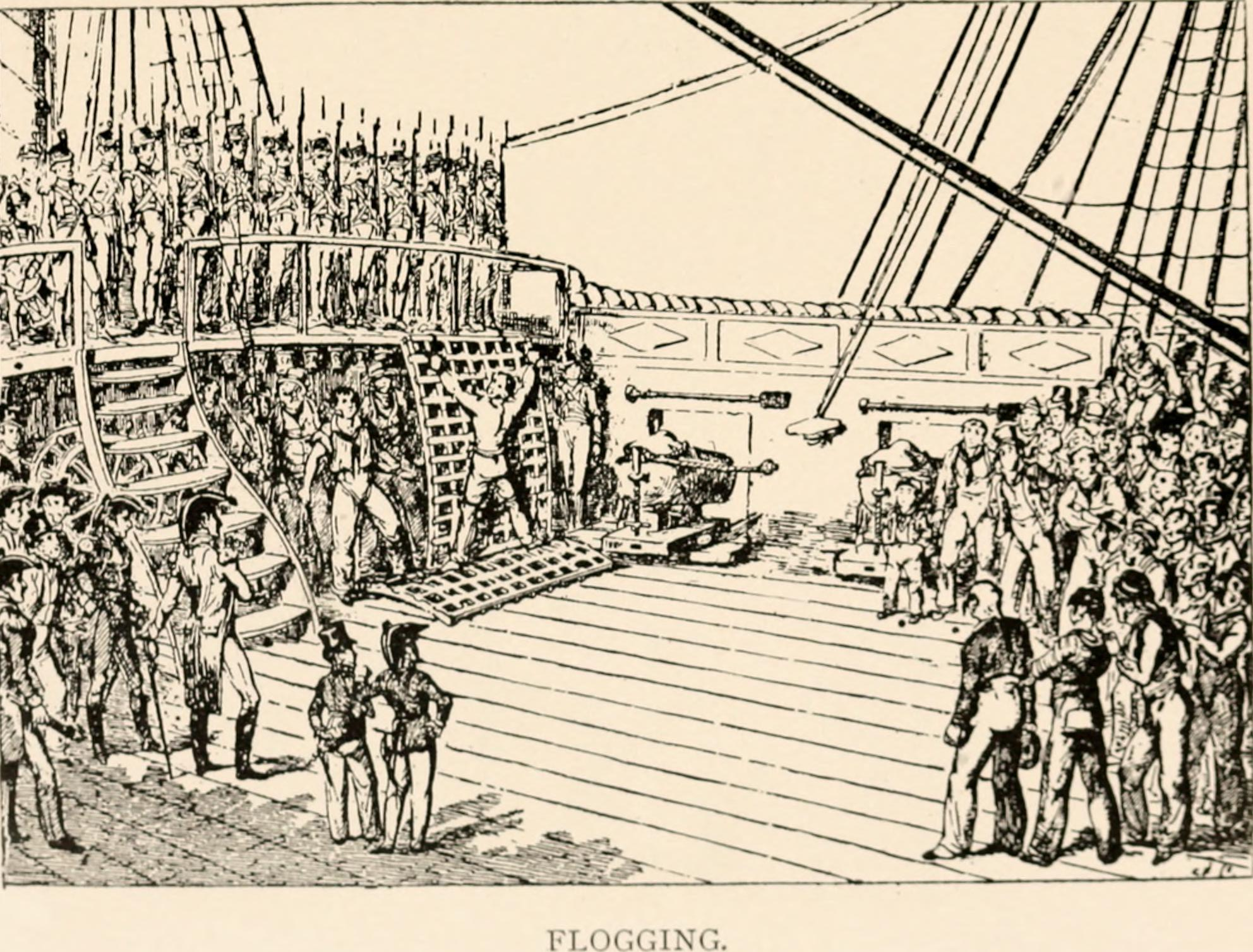
Flagellation was used as punishment in both the British Army and British Navy, as depicted in this illustration on board a British naval ship

The distance between the colonies and the British Isles meant logistics were stretched to breaking point, with the army often running out of food and supplies in the field, and forced to live off the land. Soldiers spent a great deal of time cleaning and preparing their clothing and equipment.

The harsh conditions of life in the army meant that discipline was severe. Crimes such as theft or desertion could result in hanging and punishments such as lashings were administered publicly. Discipline was harsh in the armed forces, and the lash was used to punish even trivial offences—and not used sparingly. For instance, two redcoats received 1,000 lashes each for robbery during the Saratoga campaign, while another received 800 lashes for striking a superior officer. Flogging was an even more common punishment in the Royal Navy and it came to be associated with the stereotypical hardiness of sailors.

Despite the harsh discipline, a distinct lack of self-discipline pervaded all ranks of the British forces. Soldiers had an intense passion for gambling, reaching such excesses that troops would often wager their own uniforms. Many drank heavily, and this was not exclusive to the lower ranks. The army often suffered from poor discipline away from the battlefield, gambling and heavy drinking were common among all ranks. However, among the American civilian populations, reports indicated that British troops were generally scrupulous in their treatment of non-combatants. The soldiers' own families were permitted to join soldiers in the field. Wives often washed, cooked, mended uniforms and served as nurses in the time of battle or sickness.

=== Training ===
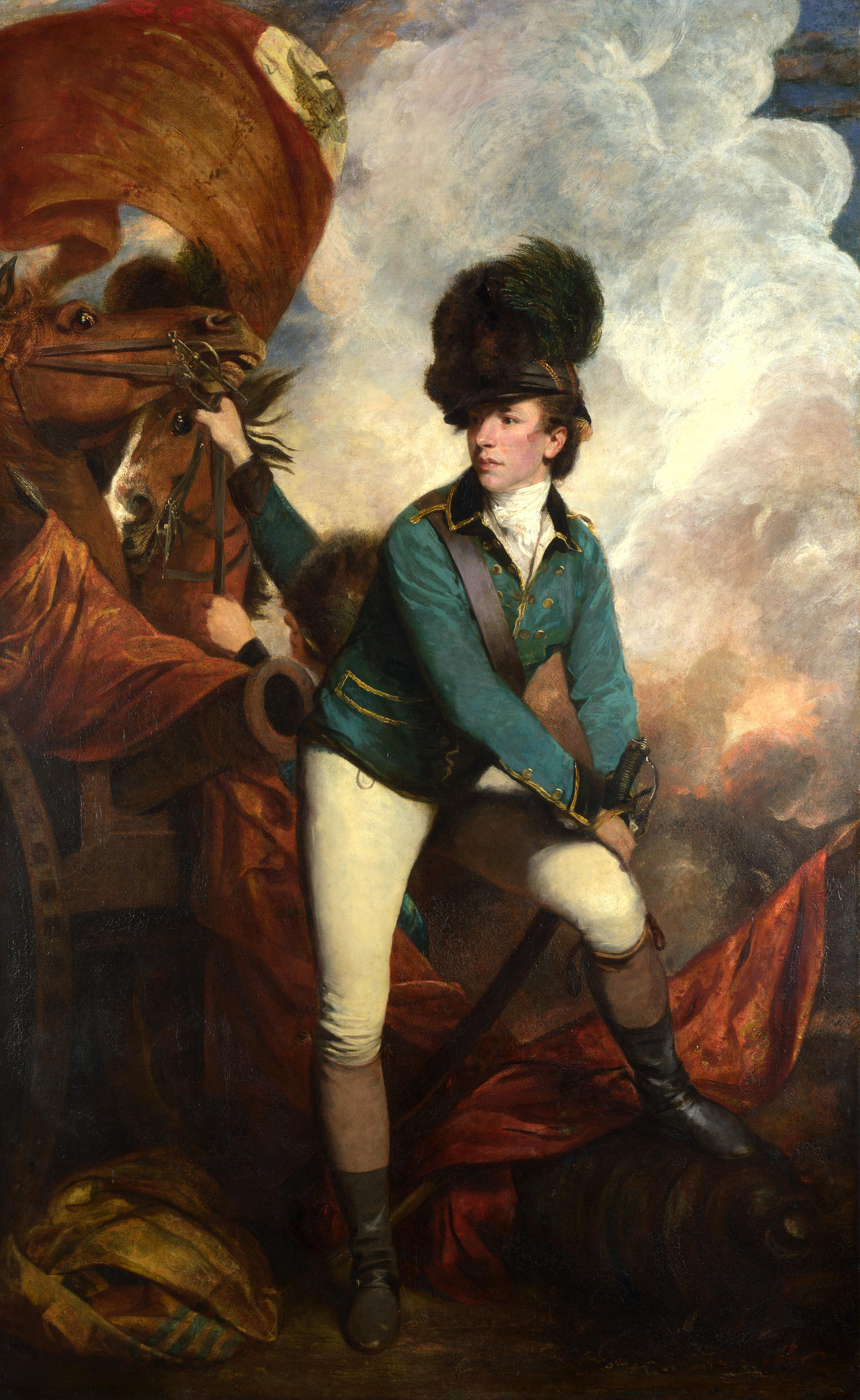
Lieutenant Colonel Banastre Tarleton, who commanded the British Legion in the Southern Colonies

The training was rigorous with firing, bayonet drills, movements, physical exercise, marching, and forming all part of the daily regimen to prepare for military campaigns.

During the course of the war, the British army conducted large-scale mock battles at Warley and Coxheath camps in southern England. The primary motivation behind this was in preparation for the threatened invasion. By all accounts the camps were massive in scale involving upwards of 18,000 men.

One militia officer wrote to his friend in August 1778: "We are frequently marched out in considerable bodies to the heaths or commons adjacent, escorted by the artillery, where we go through various movements, maneuvers and firings of a field of battle. In these expeditions, let me assure you, there is much fatigue, and no little danger...the grandest and beautiful imitations of action are daily presented to us, and believe me, the army, in general, are becoming greatly enamored by war." The maneuvers carried out at Warley camp were subject of a painting by Philip James de Loutherbourg known as Warley Camp: The Mock Attack, 1779. He also drew detailed illustrations of the uniforms of the light infantry and grenadiers present at the camp which are considered some of the most accurate surviving illustrations of 18th-century British soldiers.

== Cavalry ==
Cavalry played a smaller role in British armies than other European armies of the same era. Britain possessed no armoured cuirassiers or heavy cavalry. British doctrine tended to favour the use of medium cavalry and dragoons. The cavalry establishment consisted of three regiments of Household Cavalry, seven regiments of Dragoon Guards and six regiments of Light Dragoons. Several hundred officers and enlisted men of cavalry regiments which remained stationed in Britain volunteered for service in America and transferred to infantry regiments.

Because of the logistical limitations of campaigning in North America, cavalry played a limited role in the war. The transport of horses by ship was extremely difficult. Most of the horses died during the long journey and the ones that survived usually required several weeks to recuperate on landing. The British Army primarily adopted small numbers of dragoons who worked as scouts and were used extensively in irregular operations. One of the most successful of these units, the British Legion combined, light cavalry and light infantry and conducted raiding operations into enemy-held territory. The lack of cavalry had great tactical implications on how the war was fought. It meant that British forces could not fully exploit their victories when outmanoeuvring continental armies at battles like Long Island and Brandywine. Without a large cavalry force to follow up the infantry, retreating American forces could often escape destruction.

== Foreign units in British service ==
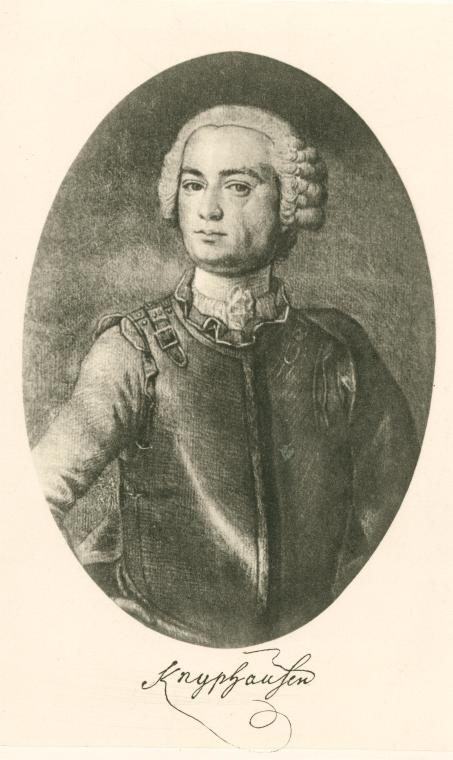
Lieutenant General Wilhelm von Knyphausen, who commanded Hessian forces during the American Revolutionary War

Manpower problems at the outbreak of war led to the British government employing large numbers of German mercenaries, primarily recruited from Hesse-Cassel. Units were sent by Count William of Hesse-Hanau, Duke Charles I of Brunswick-Wolfenbüttel, Prince Frederick of Waldeck, Margrave Karl Alexander of Ansbach-Bayreuth, and Prince Frederick Augustus of Anhalt-Zerbst.

Approximately 9,000 Hessians arrived with Howe's army in 1776 and served with British forces through the campaigns in New York and New Jersey. In all 25,000 hired auxiliaries served with Britain in the various campaigns during the war.

The German units were found to be different in tactics and approach to the regular British troops. Many British officers regarded the German regiments as slow in mobility, therefore British generals utilised them as heavy infantry. This is primarily because of the German officers' reluctance to adopt loose formations. British Lieutenant William Hale commented on the tactical limitations of the German tactical methods: "I believe them steady, but their slowness is of the greatest disadvantage in a country almost covered with woods, and against an enemy whose chief qualification is agility in running from fence to fence keeping up an irregular, but galling fire on troops who advance with the same pace as at their exercise... At Brandywine, when the first line formed, the Hessian Grenadiers were close to our rear, and began beating their march at the same time as us. From that minute we saw them no more until the action was over, and only one man of them was wounded, by a random shot which came over us."

The Hessians served in some capacity in most of the major battles of the war. Duke Karl I provided Great Britain with almost 4,000 foot soldiers and 350 dragoons under General Friedrich Adolf Riedesel. These soldiers were the majority of the German regulars under General John Burgoyne in the Saratoga campaign of 1777, and were generally referred to as "Brunswickers." The combined forces from Braunschweig and Hesse-Hanau accounted for nearly half of Burgoyne's army.

The Jägers were greatly prized by British commanders, their skill in skirmishing and scouting meant they continued to serve in the Southern campaigns under Cornwallis until the end of the war.

Soldiers from Hanover also formed part of the garrisons at Gibraltar and Minorca, and two regiments participated in the Siege of Cuddalore.

Other than mercenary troops, the Company armies serving in India consisted of regular British troops alongside native Indian sepoys. Foreigners were also present among the regular British officer corps. The Swiss-born brigadier general Augustine Prevost commanded the successful defence of Savannah in 1779. The former Jacobite officer Allan Maclean of Torloisk, who had previously held commission in the Dutch service, was second in command during the successful defence of Quebec in 1775. Another Swiss-born officer Frederick Haldimand served as Governor of Quebec in the later stages of the war. Huguenots, and exiled Corsicans also served amongst the regular and officers ranks.

== Campaigns ==
=== Boston, 1774–1775 ===
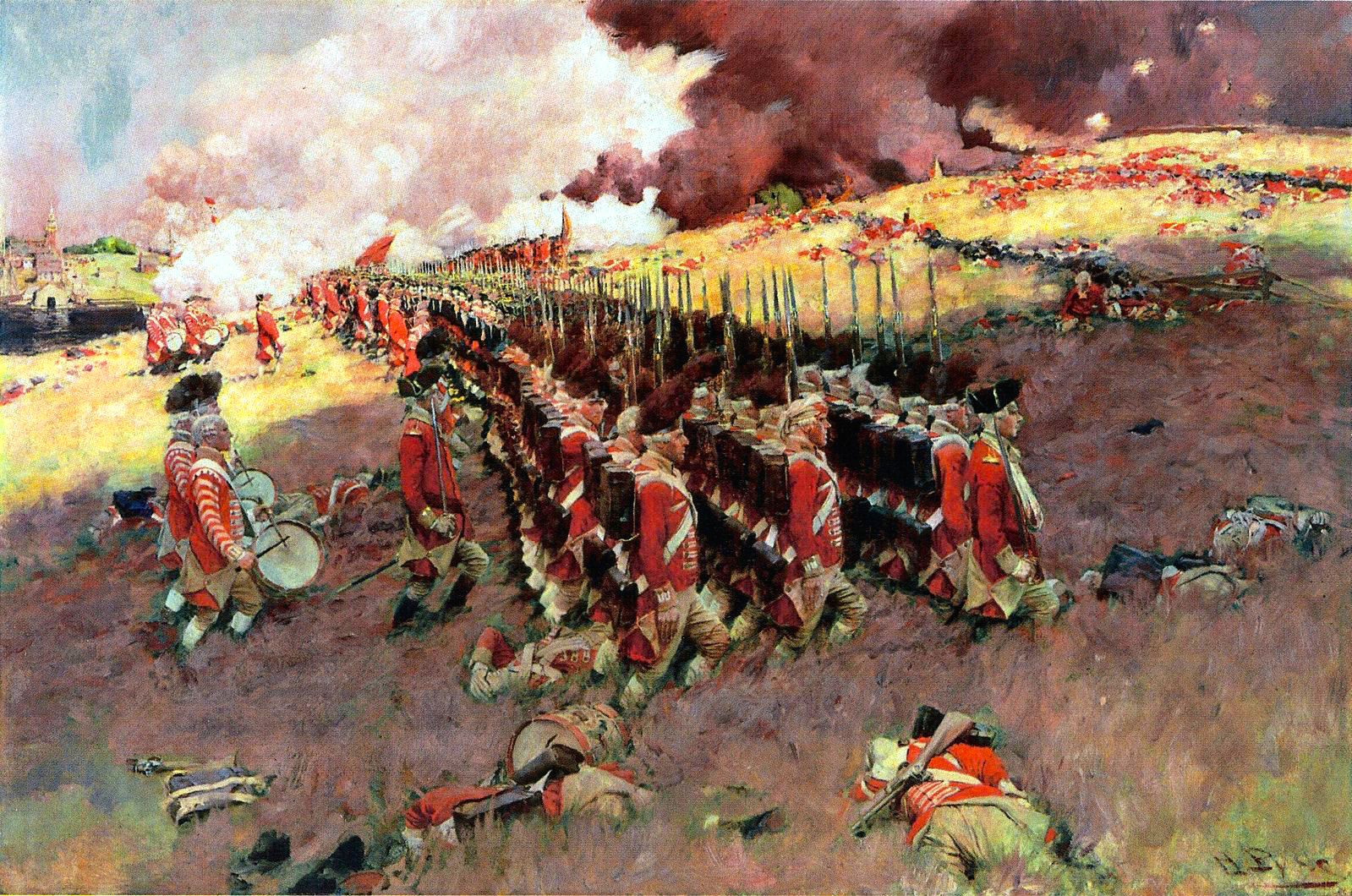
British troops advancing at Battle of Bunker Hill

British troops had been stationed in Boston since 1769 amid rising tensions between colonial subjects and the parliament in Great Britain. Fearing the impending insurrection General Thomas Gage dispatched an expedition to remove gunpowder from the powder magazine in Massachusetts on 1 September 1774. The next year on the night of 18 April 1775, Gage sent a further 700 men to seize munitions stored by the colonial militia at Concord, leading to the Battles of Lexington and Concord, the first battles of the American Revolutionary War.

The British troops stationed in Boston were largely inexperienced, and by the time the redcoats began the return march to Boston, several thousand American militiamen had gathered along the road. A running battle ensued, and the British detachment suffered heavily before reaching Charlestown. The British army in Boston found itself under siege by thousands of colonial militia.

On 17 June, British forces now under the command of General William Howe retaliated, seizing the Charlestown peninsula in the Battle of Bunker Hill. Although successful in his objective, the British forces suffered heavy casualties in taking the position. Both sides remained at stalemate until guns were placed on the Dorchester Heights, at which point Howe's position became untenable and the British abandoned Boston entirely. Howe wrote on 5 March 1776:

"The rebels have done more in one night than my whole army would have done in a month." —General Howe, 5 March 1776

=== Canada, 1775–1776 ===
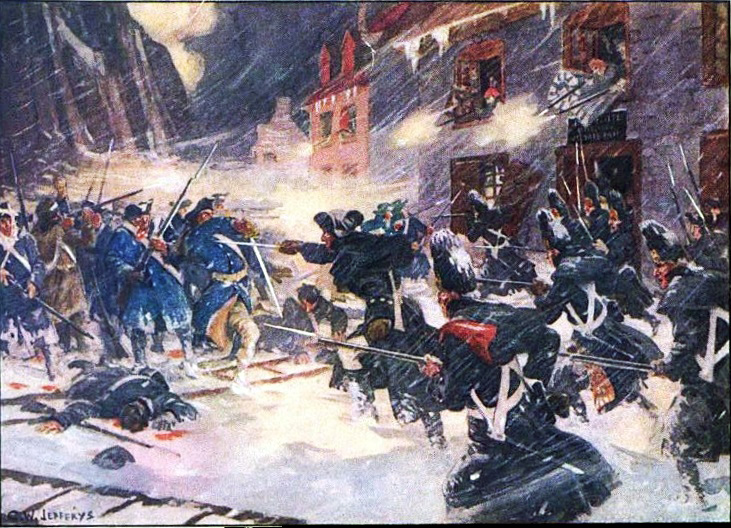
A painting of British regulars and Canadian militia repulsing the American revolutionary militia in the Invasion of Quebec

After capturing Fort Ticonderoga, American forces under the command of General Richard Montgomery launched an invasion of British controlled Canada. They besieged and captured Fort Saint-Jean, while another army moved on Montreal. However, they were defeated at the Battle of Quebec and British forces under the command of General Guy Carleton launched a counter invasion which drove the colonial forces from the province entirely and reached all the way to Lake Champlain, however came short of recapturing Fort Ticonderoga.

=== New York and New Jersey, 1776 ===
After withdrawing from Boston, Howe immediately began preparations to seize New York, which was considered the 'hinge' of the colonies. In late August, 22,000 men (including 9,000 Hessians) were rapidly landed on Long Island using flat bottomed boats, this would be the largest amphibious operation undertaken by the British army until the Normandy landings almost 200 years later.

In the ensuing Battle of Long Island on 27 August 1776, the British outflanked the American positions, driving the Americans back to the Brooklyn Heights fortifications. Not wanting to risk the lives of his men in a bloody frontal assault, Howe began to lay siege works. The navy failed to properly blockade the East River, which opened an escape route for Washington's army, which he used, managing a nighttime retreat through unguarded Manhattan Island.

British forces then fought a series of actions to consolidate control of Manhattan Island, culminating in the Battle of Fort Washington, which resulted in the capture of nearly 3,000 Continental troops. Following the conquest of Manhattan, Howe ordered Charles Cornwallis to "clear the rebel troops from New Jersey without a major engagement, and to do it quickly before the weather changed."

Cornwallis' force drove Washington's army from present-day New Jersey. Washington and the Continental Army crossed the Delaware River into present-day Pennsylvania, where Washington regrouped and began planning a retaliatory attacks. After considering several options, Washington settled on what would prove one of Washington's most complex and unexpected military maneuvers. Washington chose to covertly cross the Delaware River However, in the pre-dawn hours of 26 December, Washington crossed back into New Jersey and captured a garrison of Hessians at Trenton. Several days later, Washington outmaneuvered Cornwallis at Assunpink Creek and overwhelmed a British outpost at Princeton on 3 January 1777. Cornwallis rallied and again drove Washington away, however the defeats showed the British army had become too overstretched and Howe abandoned most of his outposts in New Jersey.

"I cannot too much commend Lord Cornwallis's good services during this campaign, and particularly the ability and conduct he displayed in the pursuit of the enemy from Fort Lee to Trenton, a distance exceding [sic] eighty miles, in which he was well supported by the ardour of his corps, who cheerfully quitted their tents and heavy baggage as impediments to their march." —General Howe, 20 December 1776

=== Saratoga, 1777 ===
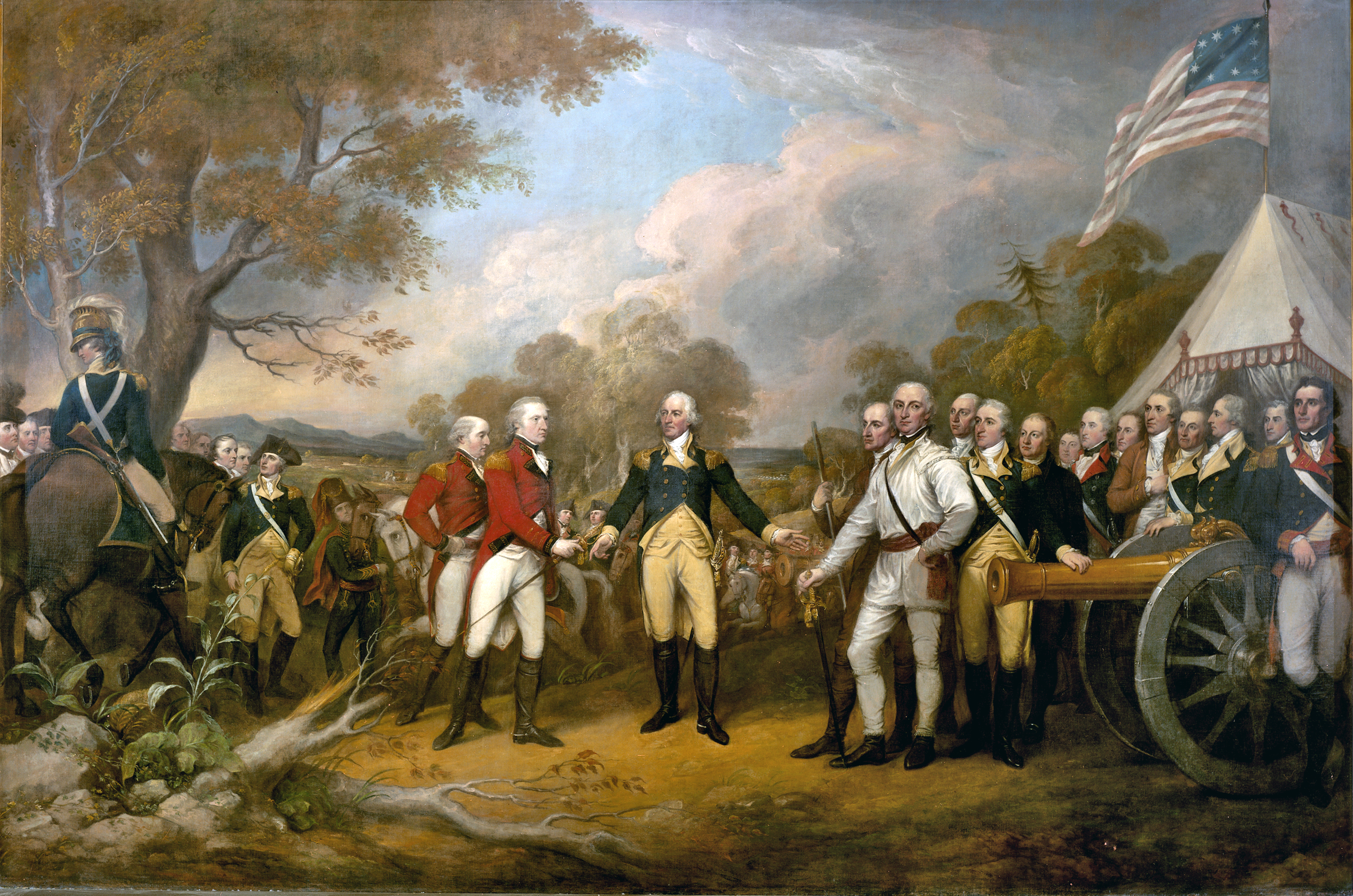
The October 1777 surrender of General John Burgoyne's army at Saratoga

Following the failure of the New York and New Jersey campaign to bring about a decisive victory over the Americans, the British army adopted a radically new strategy. Two armies would invade from the north to capture Albany, one of 8,000 men (British and Germans) under the command of General John Burgoyne, and another of 1,000 men (British, German, Indian, Loyalists, Canadians) under Brigadier General Barry St. Leger, while a third army under the command of General Howe advanced from New York in support. Through poor co-ordination and unclear orders, the plan failed. Howe believed that he could not support a Northern army until the threat of Washington's army had been dealt with and moved on Philadelphia instead. The early stages of Burgoyne's campaign met with success, capturing the forts Crown Point, Ticonderoga, and Anne. However, part of his army was destroyed at Bennington.

After winning a hard fought battle at Freeman's Farm, bought with heavy casualties, Burgoyne complained at the inexperience of his soldiers, that his men were too impetuous and uncertain in their aim, and that his troops remained in position to exchange volleys too long, rather than switch to the bayonet. Following the battle he ordered the retraining of his army. Burgoyne did not want to lose the initiative and immediately prepared a second assault to puncture the Gates' army scheduled for the following morning, however his subordinate General Fraser advised him of the fatigued state of the British light infantry and Grenadiers and that a renewed assault following a further night's rest would be carried out with greater vivacity.

That night, Burgoyne received word that Clinton would launch his own offensive. The news convinced Burgoyne to wait, believing that the American General Gates would be forced to commit part of his own force to oppose Clinton; however, Gates was being continually reinforced. Burgoyne launched the second attempt to break through the American lines early in the following month, which failed at Bemis Heights with losses that Burgoyne's force could not sustain.

Burgoyne was finally compelled surrender after it had become clear he was surrounded. Burgoyne's campaign tactics were greatly criticised, the composition of his force was disjointed, and his decision to overload his army with artillery (expecting a long siege) meant his army could not advance rapidly enough through the difficult terrain, allowing the Americans too much time to gather an overwhelming force to oppose him. The defeat had far reaching consequences as the French (who had already been secretly supporting the colonists) decided to openly support the rebellion and eventually declared war on Britain in 1778.

"I fear it bears heavy on Burgoyne...If this campaign does not finish the war, I prophesy that there is an end of British dominion in America." —General Henry Clinton, July 1777

=== Philadelphia, 1777–1778 ===
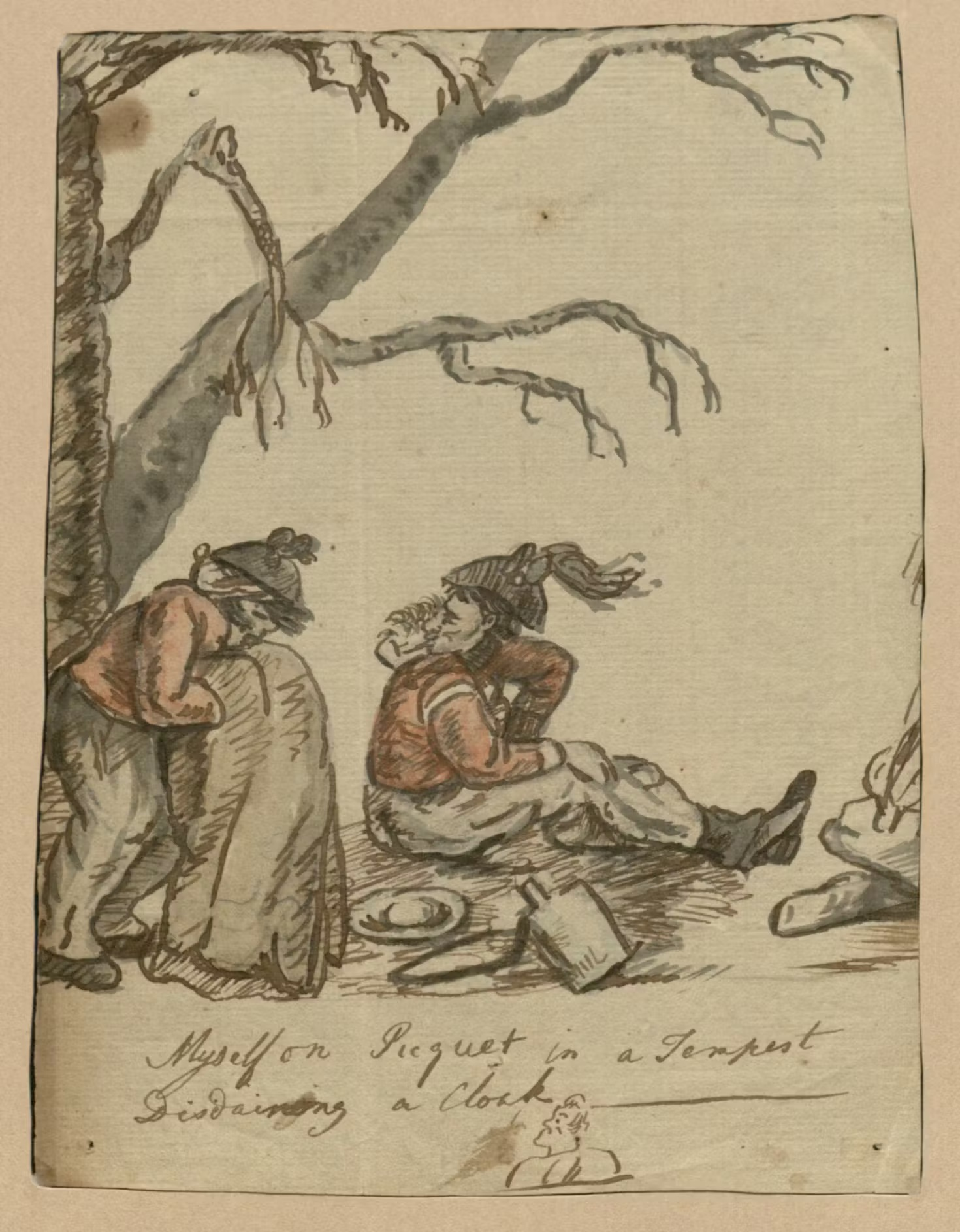
Sketch of a British officer during the Philadelphia campaign

While Burgoyne invaded from the North, Howe led an army of 15,000 men, including 3,500 Hessians, by sea to attack the revolutionary capital of Philadelphia. Rapidly outflanked by Washington at the Battle of Brandywine, however, Howe was unable to secure any notable military gain, and most of the Continental Army troops under Washington's command managed to escape. After inconclusive skirmishes with Washington and Continental Army troops in the Battle of the Clouds, a battalion of British light infantry made a surprise assault at the Battle of Paoli, eschewing their muskets in favor of bayonets to minimize the sound they made as they approached. All remaining resistance to Howe was eliminated in this attack, and the rest of Howe's army marched into Philadelphia unopposed.

The capture of Philadelphia did not turn the war in Britain's favour, and Burgoyne's army was left isolated with only limited support from Sir Henry Clinton, who was responsible for defending New York. Howe remained garrisoned in Philadelphia with 9,000 troops. He came under heavy attack from Continental Army troops under Washington's command, but Washington was driven off at the Battle of Germantown.

After an unsuccessful attempt to capture Fort Mifflin, Howe eventually took the forts of Mifflin and Mercer. After probing Washington's fortifications at the Battle of White Marsh, Howe returned to the British winter quarters and resigned his command shortly thereafter, complaining that he had been inadequately supported. Command was subsequently given to Clinton who, after the French entered the war in support of American independence, carried out orders to evacuate the British army from Philadelphia in the south to New York in the north. He did this with an overland march, fighting a large action at the Battle of Monmouth in present-day New Jersey along the way.

"...I do not think that there exists a more select corps than that which General Howe has assembled here. I am too young and have seen too few different corps, to ask others to take my word; but old Hessian and old English officers who have served a long time, say that they have never seen such a corps in respect to quality..." —Captain Muenchhausen, June, 1777

=== Raiding operations, 1778–1779 ===
In August 1778, a combined Franco-American attempt to drive British forces from Rhode Island failed. One year later an American expedition to drive British forces from Penobscot Bay also failed. In the same year Americans launched a successful expedition to drive Native Americans from the frontier of New York, and captured a British outpost in a nighttime raid. During this period the British army carried out a series of successful raiding operations, taking supplies, destroying military defences, outposts, stores, munitions, barracks, shops and houses.

=== Southern colonies, 1780–1781 ===
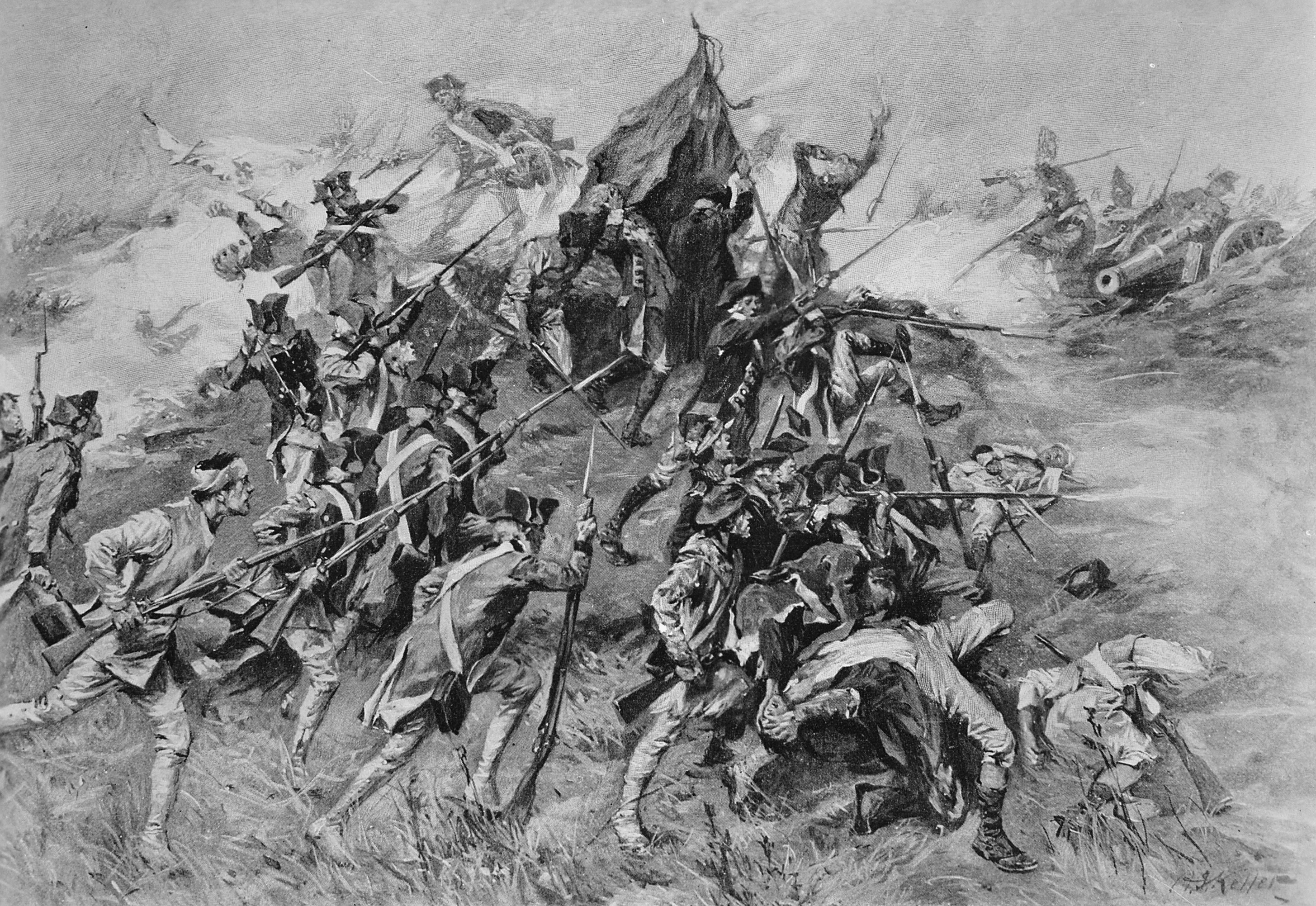
British troops repulsing American attackers at the 1780 siege of Savannah

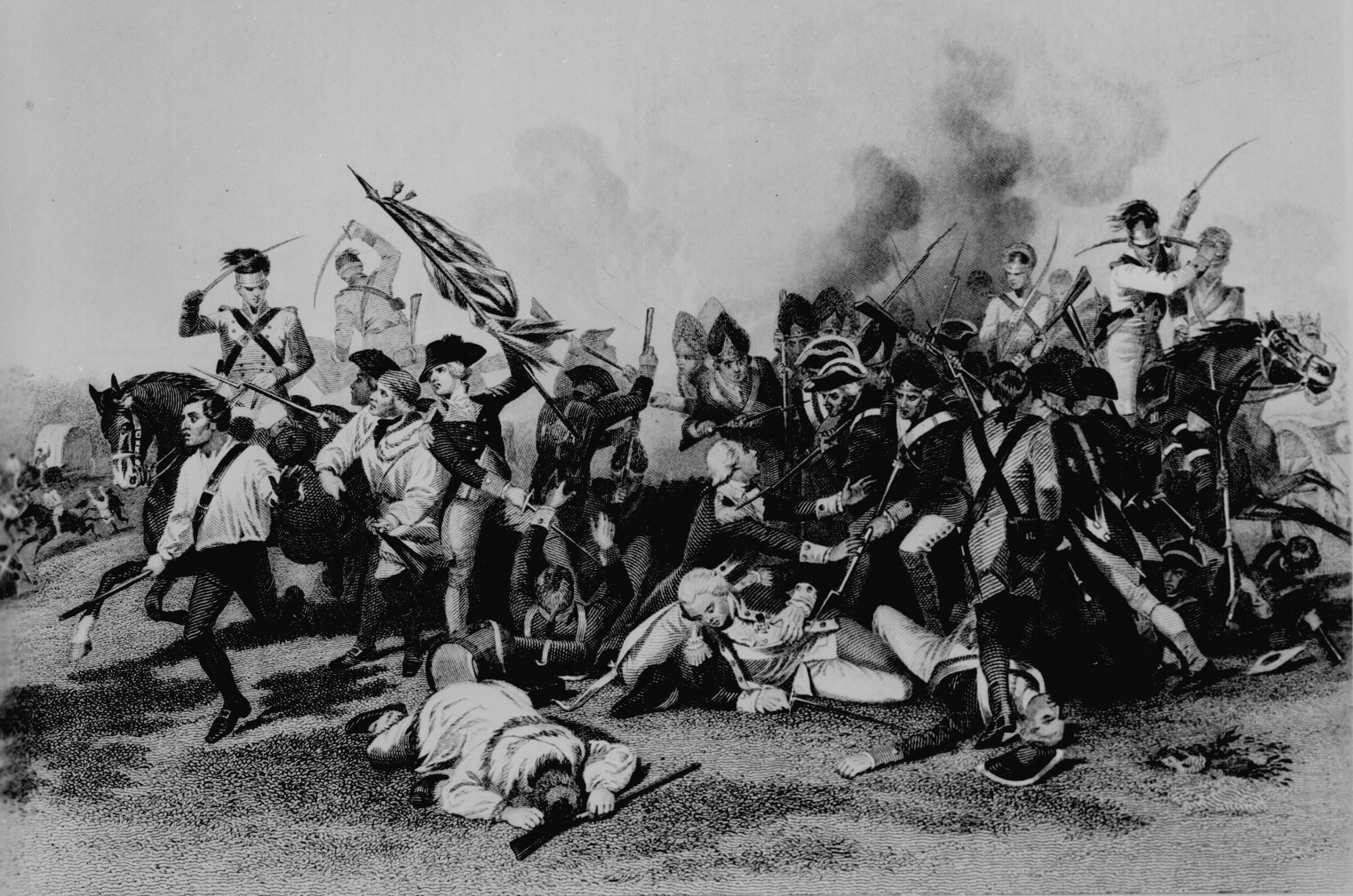
The Battle of Camden, a major British victory in 1780

The first major British operation in the Southern colonies occurred in 1776, when a force under General Henry Clinton unsuccessfully besieged the fort at Sullivan's Island. In 1778, a British force of 3,000 troops under Lieutenant Colonel Archibald Campbell successfully captured Savannah, beginning a campaign to bring the colony of Georgia under British control. A Franco-American attempt to retake Savannah in 1779 ended in failure. In 1780, the main British strategic focus turned to the Southern Colonies. British planners wrongly were convinced that a sizable number of Loyalists existed in the southern colonies. Based on that flawed assumption, they believed, a large Loyalist army could be raised to occupy the territories that had been pacified by regular British troops.

In May 1780, an army of 11,000 men under the command of Henry Clinton and Charles Cornwallis captured Charleston along with 5,000 of the Continental army. Shortly afterwards Clinton returned to New York leaving Cornwallis with a force of less than 4,000 men and instructions to secure control of the southern colonies. At first Cornwallis was successful, winning a lopsided victory at the Battle of Camden and sweeping most resistance aside. However, failing supplies and increasing partisan activity gradually wore down his occupying troops, and the destruction of a loyalist force under Major Ferguson at King's Mountain, all but ended any hopes of large scale loyalist support.

In January 1781, Tarleton's cavalry force was destroyed at the Battle of Cowpens. Cornwallis then determined to destroy the Continental army under Nathanael Greene. Cornwallis invaded North Carolina and engaged in a pursuit over hundreds of miles that became known as the "Race to the Dan". Cornwallis's ravaged army met Greene's army at Battle of Guilford Court House, and although Cornwallis was victorious he suffered heavy casualties. With little hope of reinforcements from Clinton, Cornwallis then decided to move out of North Carolina and invade Virginia. Meanwhile, Greene moved back into South Carolina and began attacking the British outposts there.

"Whenever the Rebel Army is said to have been cut to pieces it would be more consonant with truth to say that they have been dispersed, determined to join again... in the meantime they take oaths of allegiance, and live comfortably among us, to drain us of our monies, get acquainted with our numbers and learn our intentions." —Brigadier General Charles O'Hara, March 1781

=== Yorktown, 1781 ===
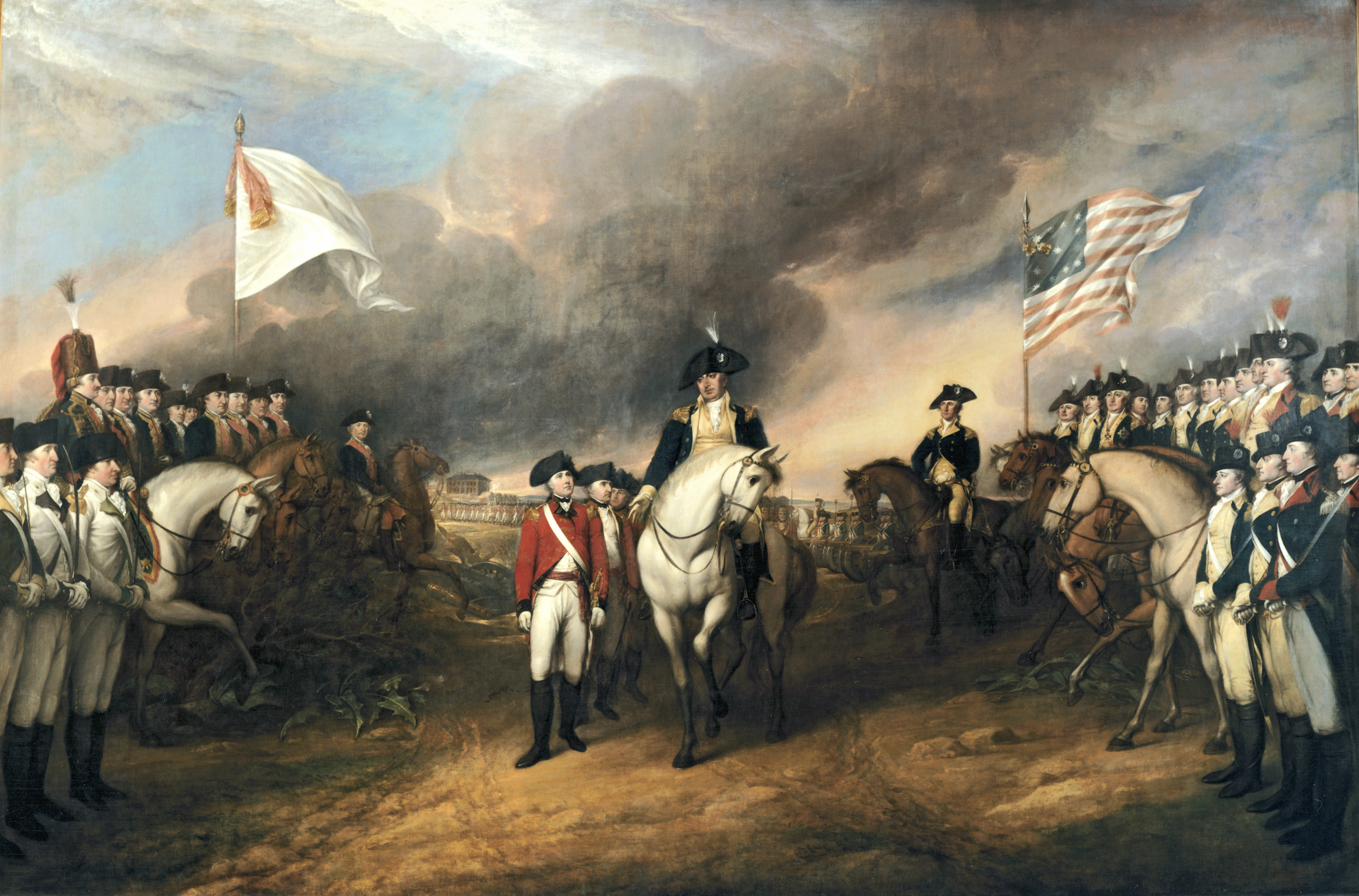
The surrender of General Cornwallis's army following the Siege of Yorktown

In early 1781, the British army began conducting raids into Virginia. Former Continental army officer Benedict Arnold, then a brigadier in the British Army after defecting, led a force with William Phillips that raided and destroyed Continental Army supply bases. He later occupied Petersburg and led a small battle Blandford.

After hearing that British forces were in Virginia and believing that North Carolina could not be subdued unless its supply lines in Virginia were cut, Cornwallis decided to join forces with Phillips and Arnold. Cornwallis's army fought a series of skirmishes against Continental Army troops under the command of Lafayette prior to fortifying themselves with their back to the sea, believing the Royal Navy could maintain supremacy over the Chesapeake Bay. He then sent requests to Clinton to be either resupplied or evacuated.

The reinforcements took too long to arrive, and in September the French fleet successfully blockaded Cornwallis in Chesapeake Bay. Royal Navy Admiral Graves believed that the threat posed to New York was more critical and withdrew. Cornwallis then became surrounded by Continental Army forces under command by Washington and French General Rochambeau. Outnumbered and with no avenue of relief or escape, Cornwallis was compelled to surrender his army.

"If you cannot relieve me very soon, you must prepare to hear the worst." — General Charles Cornwallis, September 17, 1781

=== West Indies, 1778–1783 ===
In 1776, an American force captured the British island of Nassau. After the French entered the Revolutionary War, several poorly defended British islands fell quickly. In December 1778, a force of veteran British troops under the command of General James Grant landed in St. Lucia, and successfully captured the high grounds of the islands. Three days later, 9,000 French reinforcements landed and attempted to assault the British position, but were repulsed with heavy casualties. Despite this victory, multiple other Caribbean islands under British control were lost during the war.

On 1 April 1779, Lord Germain instructed Grant to establish small garrisons throughout the West Indies, Grant believed this would be unwise and instead concentrated defences to cover the major naval bases. He posted the 15th, 28th, and 55th Foot and 1,500 gunners at Saint Kitts. The 27th, 35th, and 49th Foot and 1,600 gunners defended Saint Lucia. Meanwhile, the royal dockyard at Antigua was held by an 800-man garrison of the 40th and 60th Foot. Grant also reinforced the fleet with 925 soldiers. Although Britain lost other islands, his dispositions provided the basis for the British successes in the Caribbean during the final years of the war, including the recapture of the Bahamas from the Spanish in 1783.

=== East Indies, 1778–1783 ===
In 1778, British forces began attacking French enclaves in India, first capturing the French port of Pondicherry, and seizing the port of Mahé. The Mysorean ruler Hyder Ali, an important ally of France, declared war on Britain in 1780. Ali invaded Carnatic with 80,000 men, laying siege to British forts in Arcot. A British attempt to relieve the siege ended in disaster at Pollilur. Ali continued his sieges taking fortresses, before another British force under General Eyre Coote defeated the Mysoreans at Porto Novo. Fighting continued until 1783 when the British captured Mangalore, and the Treaty of Mangalore was signed which restored both sides lands to Status quo ante bellum.

=== Gulf Coast, 1779–1781 ===
Beginning in 1779, the governor of Spanish Louisiana Bernardo de Gálvez led a successful offensive to conquer British West Florida, which culminated in the Siege of Pensacola in 1781.

=== Spanish Central America, 1779–1780 ===
Britain made two attempts to capture Spanish territory in Central America: in 1779 at the Battle of San Fernando de Omoa and in 1780 in the San Juan Expedition. In both cases, initial British military success was defeated by tropical diseases, with the 2,500 dead of the San Juan Expedition giving it the highest British death toll of the war.

The Spanish repeatedly attacked the British settlements on the Caribbean coast but failed to drive them out. The British under Edward Despard however succeeded in retaking the Black River settlement in August 1782 with the surrender of the entire Spanish force.

=== Europe, 1779–1783 ===
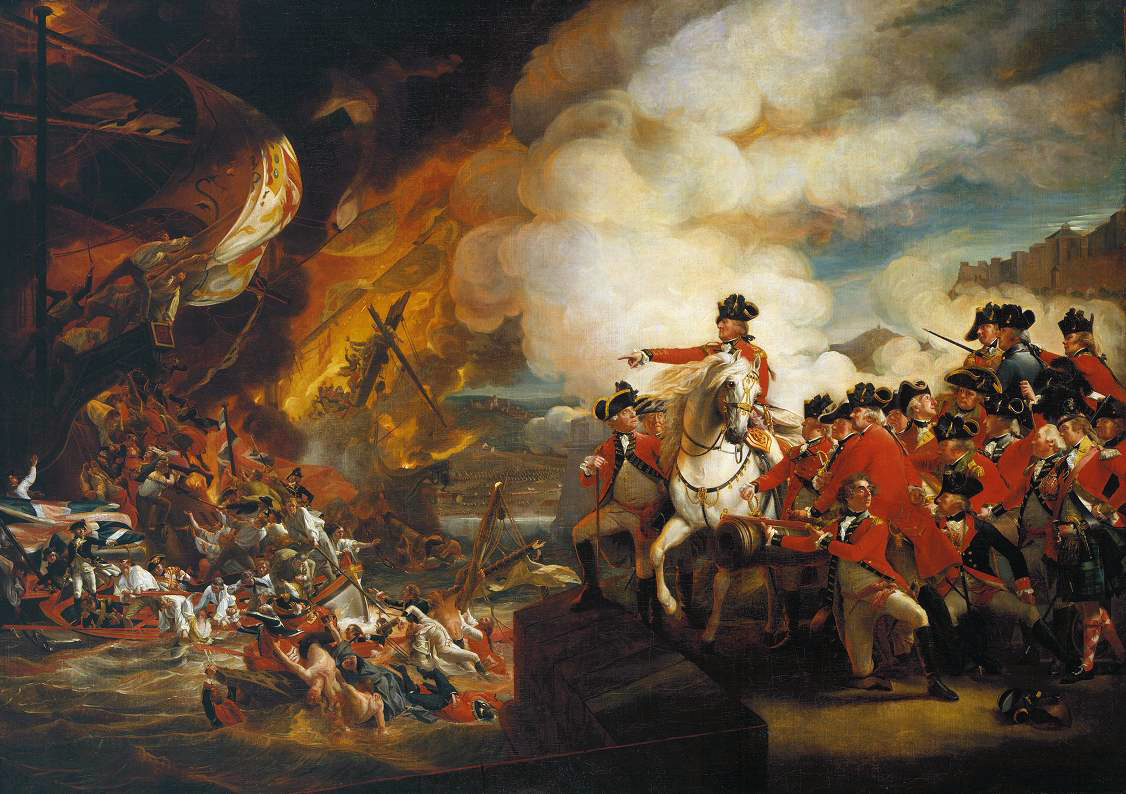
The defeat of the floating batteries at the Great Siege of Gibraltar

Europe was the setting of three of the largest engagements of the entire war. With French and Spanish forces combined they firstly attempted to invade England in 1779 but were unsuccessful due to misfortune and poor planning. They then succeeded with the capture of Minorca in 1781 but the largest of them all was the unsuccessful attempt to capture Gibraltar, which occurred in 1783 and involved over 100,000 men, and hundreds of guns and ships.

In September 1782, the grand assault on the besieged Gibraltar garrison took place, which was the largest single battle of the war, involving over 60,000 soldiers, sailors and marines. France also twice unsuccessfully attempted to capture the British channel island of Jersey, in 1779 and again in 1781.

== Post-Treaty of Paris (1783 to 1788) ==
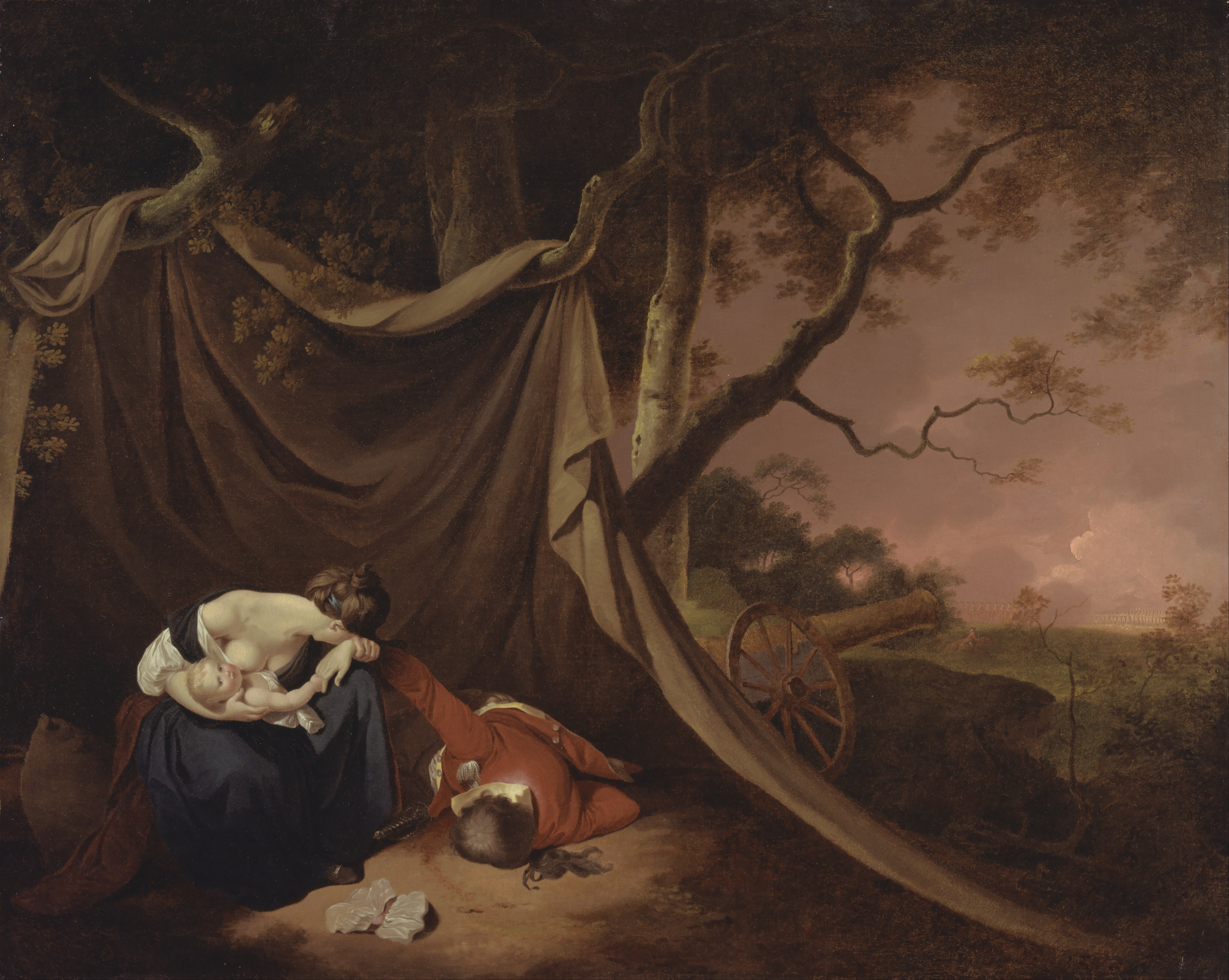
The Dead Soldier (Joseph Wright of Derby, c. 1789)

Following the Treaty of Paris, the British army began withdrawing from its remaining posts in the Thirteen Colonies. In mid-August 1783, General Guy Carleton began the evacuation of New York, informing the president of the Second Continental Congress in Philadelphia, that he was proceeding with the withdrawal of refugees, freed slaves and military personnel. More than 29,000 Loyalist refugees were evacuated from the city. Many in the North were relocated to Nova Scotia, British East Florida, the Caribbean, and London. The Loyalist refugees evacuated from New York City numbered 29,000, as well as over 3,000 Black Loyalists. Many in the South initially migrated to British Florida, including 2,000 whites and 4,000 blacks from Georgia. (Note: Initially from Georgia, there were only 400 whites with 5,000 blacks relocated to Jamaica.) Further resettlement of Black Loyalists from Nova Scotia and Canada, Jamaica and the Black Poor of London constituted the founders of the British colony of Sierra Leone in West Africa.

The British Army was again dramatically reduced in peacetime. Morale and discipline became extremely poor, and the number of troops at all levels fell. When the wars with France commenced again in 1793 its total strength stood at 40,000 men. In idleness the army again became riddled with corruption and inefficiency. Many British officers returned from America with the belief in the superiority of the firearm and formations adapted with a greater frontage of firepower. However officers who had not served in America questioned whether the irregular and loose system of fighting which had become prevalent in America was suitable for future campaigns against European powers.

In 1788, the British army was reformed by General David Dundas, an officer who had not served in America. Dundas wrote many training manuals which were adopted by the army, the first of which was the Principles of Military Movements. He chose to ignore the light infantry and flank battalions the British army had come to rely on in North America. Instead, after witnessing Prussian Army manoeuvres in Silesia in 1784, he pushed for drilled battalions of heavy infantry. He also pushed for uniformity in training, eliminating the ability of colonels to develop their own systems of training for their regiments.

Charles Cornwallis, an experienced American officer who witnessed the same maneuvers in Prussia, wrote disparagingly, "their maneuvers were such as the worst general in England would be hooted at for practicing; two lines coming up within six yards of one another and firing until they had no ammunition left, nothing could be more ridiculous". The failure to formally absorb the tactical lessons of the American War of Independence contributed to the early difficulties experienced by the British army during the French Revolutionary Wars.

== See also ==
- History of the British Army
- List of British units in the American Revolutionary War
- Timeline of the British Army
