= Nineveh Plains offensive =

2015 battle against ISIS in Iraq

Nineveh Plains Offensive
- Part of the War in Iraq (2013–2017) and the War against the Islamic State
Date	16–17 December 2015 (1 day)
Location	Nineveh Plains, Iraq
Result	Kurdish-Canadian victory

Belligerents
Kurdistan Region; Canada; Military support: Turkey; Air support: France; United Kingdom; United States	Islamic State

Units involved
Peshmerga; CSOR	Military of ISIL

Strength
Unknown number of Kurdish Peshmerga 69 Canadian special forces	300+ ISIL fighters

Casualties and losses
6+ Peshmerga fighters killed	250+ ISIL fighters killed

The Nineveh Plains offensive was a battle in which the Islamic State of Iraq and the Levant (ISIL) mounted a multi-front attack against Peshmerga forces in the area north and east of Mosul, in December 2015. The attack—the most significant ISIL military operation in the area in months, was successfully repelled by the Kurdish forces and was followed by a coalition air counter-offensive.

== Background ==
By mid-December 2015, the battlefield around the Islamic State controlled city of Mosul had shifted decisively against the Islamic State following the Kurdish recapture of Sinjar in November 2015. That victory, along with the wider offensive on Mosul's outskirts by the Peshmerga that had happened earlier in 2015, had severed one of the Islamic State's key supply lines between Mosul and Syria, especially Raqqa, and placed sustained pressure on its northern defensive belt.

Kurdish Peshmerga units were steadily advancing along the Nineveh Plains, threatening to tighten a noose around Mosul’s eastern and northeastern approaches. However, disagreements between Kurdish and Iraqi forces slowed the process of expelling the Islamic State from Mosul. The Kurds thus appealed to the U.S.-led international coalition for more military support in its fight against the Islamic State.

Western officials, including Ashton B. Carter, were in the region meeting Kurdish leadership in Erbil at the time, which underscored the growing strategic importance of Kurdish operations.

== Offensive ==
On December 16 and 17, Islamic State militants launched a multi-front offensive against the Kurdish defensive lines lasting 17 hours and involving at least 300 heavily armed Islamic State fighters. The offensive involved at least four coordinated attacks, in the Newaran, Bashik, Tl Eswed, Khazir and Zerdk Mountain areas, as well as the Peshmerga bunkers in the village of Shindokha. The attack involved an element of surprise, and the ISIL fighters were able to briefly breach the lines before being repelled. The attack was described as "the hardest punch ISIL had thrown since this summer" by a U.S. military official.

The military Zilikahn base, where 100–200 Turkish troops have been training local Peshmerga fighters, was also attacked by mortar fire and Katyusha rockets. A spokesman for the Patriotic Union of Kurdistan said that the ISIL fighters were trying to target Peshmerga forces and attacked the Zilikan base by mistake.

Canadian special forces, numbering 69, were also in the area to train Kurdish forces and were involved in the battle, laying down supporting fire to back up the Kurds as they undertook a counter-offensive Thursday. Canadian forces have also in the past acted as spotters for coalition planes.

Brig. Gen Mark Odom, the senior American officer in the area, indicated that ISIL's principal objective may have been a "spoiling attack", meant to disrupt efforts to encircle and capture Mosul. Iraq Kurdish president Masoud Barzani noted that the attack occurred on Kurdish Flag Day and speculated that it had been under preparation for a month.

== Tactics ==
ISIL fighters used mortars, rockets and several vehicular suicide bombers. In one area—Nawaran—extremists set off nine car bombs, according to local reports. Trucks with mounted machine guns were also used in support, as well as armored bulldozers, to fill defensive trenches protecting the Kurdish positions. The attackers also took advantage of the bad weather to provide cover.

The possible use of a drone by ISIL, possibly to direct mortar fire, was noted by Atheel al-Nujaifi, the former governor of Iraq's Nineveh province. Initially assumed to belong to the coalition, contacts revealed that it was not theirs.

== Air counterattack ==
American, British, French, and Canadian planes were involved in a series of airstrikes against the ISIL forces to assist the Kurds in repelling the attack. ISIL positions were also bombed. Some Kurdish commanders noted that while they were grateful for the Western air support, that they felt that the planes were somewhat late.

== Casualties ==
Estimates of ISIL casualties were of 70 killed by the Kurdish defenders, and "at least 180" killed by airstrikes. Four Turkish soldiers were also injured. Kurdish losses amounted to at least six dead.

== See also ==
- Combined Joint Task Force – Operation Inherent Resolve
- War in Iraq (2013–2017)
- Islamic State
