= Timeline of the British Army 1900–1999 =

The Time line of the British Army 1900–1999 lists the conflicts and wars the British Army were involved in.

- Boxer Rebellion ended 1901
- Anglo-Aro War 1901–1902
- Second Boer War ended 1902
- World War I 1914–1918
- Easter Rising 1916
- Third Afghan War 1919
- Irish War of Independence 1919–1921
- World War II 1939–1945
- Greek civil war 1946-47
- Malayan Emergency 1948–1960
- Korean War 1950–1953
- Mau Mau Uprising 1952–1960
- Cypriot Independence 1955–1959
- Suez Crisis 1956–1957
- Brunei Revolt 1962–1966
- Indonesia–Malaysia confrontation 1962-1966
- Dhofar Rebellion 1962–1975
- Aden Emergency 1963–1967
- The Troubles 1968–1998
- Operation Banner 1969–2007
- Falklands War 1982
- Gulf War 1990–1991
- Yugoslav wars 1991–2001
- Bosnian War 1992–1995
- Kosovo War 1998–1999

== See also ==
- Timeline of the British Army
- Timeline of the British Army 1700–1799
- Timeline of the British Army 1800–1899
- Timeline of the British Army since 2000
