= Timeline of the British Army 1700–1799 =

The Timeline of the British Army 1700–1799 lists the conflicts and wars in which the British Army was involved.

- War of the Spanish Succession 1701–1714
- Jacobite rebellions 1715, 1719 and 1745–1746
- Great Northern War 1717–1720
- War of the Quadruple Alliance 1718–1720
- War of the Austrian Succession 1740–1748
- Carnatic Wars 1744–1763
- Seven Years' War 1756–1763
- Pontiac's war 1763–1766
- Anglo-Mysore Wars 1766–1799
- First Anglo-Maratha War 1775–1782
- American Revolutionary War 1775–1783
- French Revolutionary Wars 1792–1802
- Irish Rebellion of 1798

== See also ==
- Timeline of the British Army 1800–1899
- Timeline of the British Army 1900–1999
- Timeline of the British Army since 2000
