= Mosul offensive (2015) =

2015 offensive against ISIL

- Part of the War in Iraq
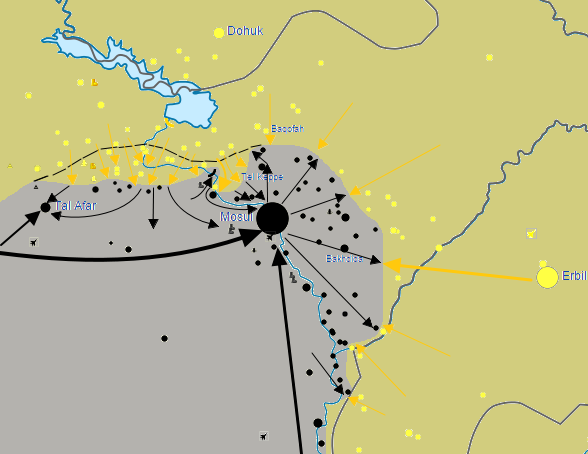
- Map of the Kurdish-launched Mosul offensive in early 2015
Date	21 January – 10 February 2015 (2 weeks and 6 days)
Location	Mosul, Iraq 35.8003°N 43.2897°E
Result	Peshmerga victory: Kurdish Peshmerga forces cut crucial supply routes to Mosul, retake some nearby villages, and open three fronts to the northwest of Mosul, near Badush Dam; The US-led Coalition intensifies airstrikes near Mosul to support the campaign to retake the city; Peshmerga forces continue to hold the areas and roads they captured, with Coalition airstrikes hampering ISIL operations in the region

Belligerents
Kurdistan Region: Peshmerga; CJTF-OIR (airstrikes) List: United States United Kingdom Canada Jordan Morocco	Islamic State of Iraq and the Levant

Commanders and leaders
(Kurdistan Region) Masoud Barzani (Kurdistan Region) Mansour Barzani (United States) Barack Obama (United Kingdom) David Cameron (Canada) Stephen Harper (Jordan) Abdullah II	(Islamic State) Abu Bakr al-Baghdadi (Leader) "Prince of Nineveh" † (top ISIL commander in Mosul); Abu Malik † (ISIL chemical weapons expert)

Strength
Kurdistan Region: 5,000 soldiers	12,000+ fighters

Casualties and losses
Unknown	256+ militants killed
- 3 civilians killed

The Mosul offensive (2015) was an offensive launched by Kurdish Peshmerga forces on 21 January 2015, with the objective of severing key ISIL supply routes to Mosul, Iraq, and to recapture neighboring areas around Mosul. The effort was supported by US-led coalition airstrikes. The Iraqi Army was widely expected to launch the planned operation to retake the actual city of Mosul in the Spring of 2015, but the offensive was postponed to October 2016, after Ramadi fell to ISIL in May 2015.

== Background ==
Ever since the city of Mosul fell to ISIL forces on 10 June 2014, the United States and the Iraqi Government had been planning to retake the city. Initially, the original plan called for an assault on Mosul in July or August 2015, even though some US officials claimed that an attack at that point would be "too late." On December 25, 2014, after Hassan Saeed Al-Jabouri, the ISIL governor of Mosul, was killed by a US-led Coalition airstrike in Mosul, it was revealed that the US planned to retake the city of Mosul in January 2015. In late January 2015, Iraqi Army forces began preparing for the assault on Mosul.

== Offensive ==
On 21 January 2015, 5,000 Kurdish Peshmerga soldiers liberated multiple villages neighboring Mosul, amid speculation that the Iraqi Army was preparing for an assault on Mosul. The Peshmerga forces also disrupted essential ISIL supply routes between Mosul, Tal Afar, and Syria, and they reclaimed over 500 kilometers of land in the region. However, Kurdish officials states that they do not plan to move beyond primarily-Kurdish areas, and that retaking the city of Mosul itself was the responsibility of the Iraqi Army. An estimated 200 ISIL fighters were killed. Among the ISIL militants killed was the new ISIL governor of the Nineveh Governorate. Peshmerga forces also positioned themselves on three fronts to the northwest of Mosul, near Badush Dam. Kurdish forces reported firing 20 Grad missiles into Mosul, upon receiving intelligence that ISIL militants were gathering to meet near the city's Zuhour neighborhood. Firing from about 12 miles north of Mosul, Captain Shivan Ahmed said the rockets hit their targets. ISIL claimed that the rockets hit civilians.

On 22 January 2015, the US increased its number of airstrikes near Mosul to a record number of 16. The airstrikes struck two large ISIL units, two ISIL tactical units, an ISIL building, an ISIL mortar team, and destroyed six ISIL culverts, two ISIL bridges, three ISIL buildings, an ISIL artillery system, 11 ISIL vehicles, an ISIL fighting position, six ISIL staging positions, two ISIL heavy weapons, an ISIL VBIED, and four ISIL armored vehicles. The Royal Canadian Air Force has also destroyed numerous ISIL targets around Mosul in support of ground forces.

On 23 January 2015, the heightened US airstrike campaign continued, with 8 airstrikes being carried out in and near Mosul. The airstrikes struck three ISIL tactical units and a large ISIL unit, and destroyed seven ISIL vehicles, two ISIL VBIEDs, an ISIL bulldozer, four ISIL buildings, an ISIL artillery system, an ISIL heavy weapon system, two ISIL armored vehicles, an ISIL shipping container, and an ISIL bunker.

On 27 January 2015, ISIL launched a surprise attack on the oil-rich city of Kirkuk, in an attempt to draw Kurdish Peshmerga fighters away from Mosul. However, Peshmerga forces managed to staunch the attack and regain some lost territory in the region, with the US ramping up their airstrikes near Kirkuk to 19 on 1 February 2015, in response to the ISIL advance.

On 4 February 2015, Jordan began launching airstrikes on ISIL positions in Iraq, in retaliation for ISIL's brutal killing of Jordanian pilot Muath al-Kasasbeh. The airstrikes killed 55 ISIL militants in Mosul, including a senior ISIL commander known as the "Prince of Nineveh."

On 6 February 2015, an RAF Tornado GR4 patrol worked closely with a coalition surveillance platform to provide air support for Peshmerga forces, who were engaged in close combat with ISIL terrorists near Mosul. When an ISIL mortar position opened fire on the Peshmerga, the Tornados responded with a Brimstone missile, scoring a direct hit.

On 9 February 2015, John Allen, the U.S. coordinator for the international coalition against ISIL, stated that the Iraqi Army, backed by Coalition airstrikes, will launch a ground offensive "in the weeks ahead" to regain the territory lost to ISIL, including the city of Mosul. On the same day, Coalition sources reported that the Kurdish Peshmerga had recaptured additional territory near Mosul.

On 10 February, it was revealed that Peshmerga forces were only 6 to 9 miles away from the city center of Mosul, in the northwestern outskirts, and that they had managed to retake the Nineveh Plains area (more specifically, the majority of the Tel Keppe District) to the northwest of Mosul. However, the Kurds stated that they were waiting for further orders to enter the outskirts of Mosul city.

== Airstrikes ==
Between 12 February and 21 June, at least 91 Coalition airstrikes took place near Mosul, striking 23 ISIL tactical units and destroying 31 ISIL fighting positions, 13 vehicles, 12 heavy machine guns, 12 excavators, 11 ISIL buildings, seven armored vehicles, nine staging areas, five rocket and four mortar firing positions, two bulldozers, two IED factories, a checkpoint and a trench system. The sorties included British RAF Tornado GR4 patrols which attacked ISIL defenses around Mosul with Paveway IV laser-guided bombs and Brimstone missiles.

The airstrikes killed or wounded dozens of ISIL militants. One round of Coalition strikes on 5 April, killed a total of 18 ISIL militants in Western Mosul, while from 25 to 26 March, US-led Coalition airstrikes were reported to have killed over 150 ISIL militants in Mosul.

== Continuing ISIL–Kurdish clashes, planning, and delays ==
On 17 February, Iraqi Colonel Masoud Salih stated that the battle to liberate Mosul would probably take 30,000 soldiers, and at least 10 months. Also, he stated that another Iraqi official had estimated a minimum of 12,000 ISIL militants present in the city, dismissing rumors of 30,000 militants being present as "ISIS propaganda."

In late February 2015, it was revealed that around 25,000 well-trained Iraqi ground troops, trained by American forces, will be deployed to retake the city of Mosul. Additionally, it was revealed that the Iraqi Army should join the liberation effort by April or early May 2015, with the intention of avoiding having to fight during Iraq's summer heat around Ramadan. It was also reported by US General Lloyd Austin that small numbers of US troops could join the fray, if they are needed.

On 6 March, it was reported that Shakir al-Hamdani, ISIL's third Governor of Mosul, was killed in a US-led Coalition airstrike.

In early March 2015, it was reported that Turkey was planning to send ground troops to participate in the Liberation of Mosul, although a Turkish senior official stated that Turkey may limit its contributions to logistics. On 4 March, the Iraqi Defense Minister stated that Iraq could retake Mosul without help from foreign ground forces.

On 11 March, ISIL threatened on loudspeakers to behead any civilian who tries to leave Mosul. The announcement came one day after US planes dropped paper pamphlets into the city, warning of an imminent military confrontation, and advising all civilians to evacuate the city. Also, on the same day, the US-led Coalition carried out five airstrikes in and around Mosul, which struck an ISIL tactical unit, an ISIL outpost, and destroyed an ISIL armored vehicle.

On 16 March, the Peshmerga bombed ISIL strongholds in the Forest area of central Mosul from Mount Baashiqa, killing and wounding dozens of ISIL fighters. Eight days later, Peshmerga forces clashed with ISIL forces in eastern Mosul, killing 13 ISIL militants.

On 3 May 2015, the Guardian reported that ISIL leader Abu Bakr al-Baghdadi was recovering from severe injuries he received from an 18 March 2015 airstrike, in a part of Mosul. In the meantime, Abu Alaa Afri had assumed control of ISIL as Deputy Leader. It was also reported that al-Baghdadi's spinal injury, which left him incapacitated, means that he may never be able to fully resume direct command of ISIL.

On 11 June, Iraqi General Najim al-Jubouri, the commander of the planned operation to retake Mosul, reported that Iraqi special forces were massing to the north of Baghdad and Baiji, in preparation for the coming battle. Units from the 15th and 16th Divisions of the Iraqi Army, federal police, and Golden Brigade were said to have been dispatched. General al-Jubouri also stated that the Iraqi forces deployed had been trained, and that they will be equipped with advanced weapons when the assault begins. He also said that the operation would be accompanied by an intense Coalition air campaign against ISIL positions in Mosul.

On 12 June 2015, Head of Ninawa Operations Command General Najim al-Jubouri stated that the planned offensive for Mosul had begun, with Iraqi forces, along with Shi'ite Popular Mobilization Forces fighters, being deployed to the city of Baiji, on the road to Mosul. US-led Coalition warplanes were also reported to be pounding ISIL positions in Mosul. However, it was noted that the only one who could officially declare the start of the battle was the Iraqi Prime Minister Haidar al-Abadi, which he did not. In addition, two days earlier, The Daily Beast interviewed the general who said the date to begin the operation, "may be very close but I can't tell you when exactly". When pressed he said it would take place in less than a year and that more than 30,000 soldiers would take part, which some analysts found hard to believe since the Iraqi military was still decimated and rebuilding following the successful ISIL offensive of June 2014. The news agency described the general's plan to retake the city as "fantasy".

Another contributing factor to the delay of the offensive was the ISIL capture of Ramadi, the provincial capital of Anbar province, in May 2015. As of late June, Iraqi General al-Jubouri said that forces were still being marshaled for an assault on Mosul, while city residents were becoming increasingly disappointed at the constant delays of the offensive.

On 15 June, US airstrikes in Mosul killed Ali Awni al-Harzi, a Tunisian ISIL operative who was a CIA person of interest, and had suspected links to the 2012 Benghazi attack. He was also said to operate closely with ISIL militants in North Africa and across the Middle East. He was the brother of Tariq bin al-Tahar bin al-Falih al-'Awni al-Harzi, who was killed in Syria the following day. On 23 June, Zaalan al-Afari, the finance minister of ISIL, was killed with four other ISIL militants by a booby-trap on the road while returning from the town of Gayara to Mosul.

On 13 September, U.S. envoy John Allen said that the battle led by the coalition against ISIL is a long-term battle, but that Mosul would be captured "within months". Iraqi forces also announced that they had now trained 20,000 soldiers to recapture Mosul.

On 14 September, ISIL reportedly killed 15 of its own handicapped, bedridden fighters. The fighters had lost their limbs from waist down while fighting Iraqi and Peshmerga forces and ISIL was said to have killed them due to "the inability" to provide them with the necessary care.

On 21 September, 90 US troops arrived at the base in Makhmur, southwest of Iraq's Kurdish capital Erbil, to train, advise and assist missions in preparation for the campaign on Mosul. It was furthermore speculated that they may take on an active role in the assault itself.

On December 17 2015, ISIL mounted a major offensive against Kurdish positions but were repelled by the Peshmerga and included contact between Canadian special forces on the ground and ISIL.

On January 21, 2016, even after the Coalition airstrikes and battlefield losses from previous offensives, it was estimated that ISIL still had up to 10,000 fighters defending Mosul, which would require 24,000+ highly trained Iraqi soldiers to dislodge from the city. On January 23, 2016, it was reported that 400+ ISIL fighters had been killed in clashes with the Peshmerga and other local forces, during the past few days.

On February 4, it was reported that 700,000 civilians were still living under ISIL rule in Mosul.

== See also ==
- American-led intervention in Iraq (2014–present)
- Nineveh Plains offensive
- Mosul offensive (2016)
