= Bashiqah =

Mountain in Iraq

Bashiqah Mountain is a mountain located northeast of Mosul, Iraq, east of Khorsabad and nearby Bashiqa township and near Ain Sifni in northern Iraq.

The mountain is located behind Bashiqa township, is 359 km north of Baghdad in Nineveh Governorate, and located at 36,4531n and 43,3478e. It is 326 above sea level. The mountain contains many Yazidi shrines dedicated to the holy figures of Yazidism.

The mountain became a strategic point following the Fall of Mosul to ISIS in 2014 but was retaken with the recapture of Mosul in July 2017. The hill was heavily fortified by ISIS. The mountain has since been taken by Kurdish Peshmerga forces.

== Climate ==
The climate is Csa under the Köppen-Geiger system, average temperature in Bashiqah is 19.5°C and the average annual rainfall is 572 mm.
