= Timeline of the British Army =

This timeline covers the main wars, battles and engagements and related issues for the Scottish, English and British Army, from 1537 to the present. See also Timeline of British diplomatic history.

== 1500–1599 ==
- 1537 – The Overseers of the Fraternity or Guild of St George received a royal charter from Henry VIII on 25 August, when letters patent were received authorising them to establish a perpetual corporation for the defence of the realm to be known as the Fraternity or Guild of Artillery of Longbows, Crossbows and Handgonnes. This body was known by a variety of names since, but today is called the Honourable Artillery Company, and is the oldest regiment in continuous service in the British Army.
- 1539 – The Royal Monmouthshire Royal Engineer Regiment is first mustered before becoming a militia force for the county of Monmouth. When the new Police was formed in the 19th century, the regiment switched to the Royal Engineers Reserve, becoming the Royal Monmouthshire Royal Engineers Militia the senior regiment of the Reserve Army.
- 1572 – The Buffs were formed from London's urban militia to support the Protestants in Holland, where they remained until the outbreak of the Anglo-Dutch war in 1665 (93 years), at which point they were disbanded for refusing the oath of loyalty to the Dutch States General. Reformed in England as 'The Holland Regiment' in King Charles II British Army and designated 3rd Regiment of Foot. The Regiment became a part of the Queens Regiment in 1966. 1992 Princess of Wales's Royal Regiment, with the Buffs cap badge Tudor Dragon origins from Queen Elizebeth I worn in the centre of the PWRR cap badge by all ranks.

== 1600–1706 ==
- 1633 – The Royal Regiment of Foot (later the Royal Scots) is placed on the Scottish Establishment, later becoming the oldest infantry regiment in the British Army. And still to this day as The Royal Regiment of Scotland.
- 1642 – Marquis of Argyll's Royal Regiment was raised by Archibald Campbell, 1st Marquess of Argyll for service in Ireland, renamed in 1650 Lyfe Guard of Foot and reformed as the Scottish Regiment of Foot Guards in 1661 (later the Scots Guards).
- 1650 – George Monck's Regiment is formed (later the Coldstream Guards), becoming the oldest infantry regiment, not of the line, in the British Army but not under the monarch.
- 1656 – Lord Wentworth's Regiment is formed (later the Grenadier Guards), later becoming the most senior infantry regiment in the British Army because of the long serving loyalty to the monarch during the English Civil War.
- 26 January 1661 – King Charles II issues warrant, becoming the acknowledged beginning of the British Army. This concerned an assemblage of English regiments and Scottish regiments brought south with Charles II. The British Army would not formally exist, however, for another 46 years, as Scotland and England remained two independent states, each with its own Army.
- 1 October 1661 – The Tangier Regiment of Foot is formed spending 18 years in Tangier, first Battle Honour. After N Africa in England re named The Queens Regiment, today the Princess of Wales's Royal Regiment (PWRR) Englands senior Regiment. The Paschal Lamb, one of the first cap badges is worn by all ranks of PWRR on their buttons.
- 1684 – The English withdraw from the Colony of Tangier.
- 1688 – The War of the Grand Alliance begins.
- 1702 – War of the Spanish Succession begins.

== 1707–1800 ==
- 1707 – Kingdom of Great Britain is formed. Scottish and English armies merged to create the British Army.
- 1722 – Royal Regiment of Artillery is formed.
- 1742 – War of the Austrian Succession begins.
- 1743 – Battle of Dettingen, King George II becomes the last British monarch to lead his troops into battle.
- 1746 – Battle of Culloden, The British Army, made from Scottish, English and Irish soldiers and led by the Duke of Cumberland, fights the last major battle on British mainland soil against French supported Scottish rebel Jacobites.
- 1751 – A numerical system is introduced into the Army, such as 1st Regiment of Foot, 2nd Regiment of Foot, etc.
- 1755 – Seven Years' War begins.
- 1759 – Battle of Minden, the Duke of Brunswick leads an Anglo-German army against the French.
- 1759 – British forces, led by General James Wolfe, take French Quebec.
- 1775 – American War of Independence begins.
  - 17 June – Battle of Bunker Hill
- 1776 – British victory at the Battle of Long Island.
- 1777 – British victory at the Battle of Brandywine.
- 1777 – British defeat at the Battle of Saratoga.
- 1781 – British defeat at the siege of Yorktown.
- 1793 – War on revolutionary France declared
- 1795 – Capture of Ceylon.
- 1796 – slave forces in Haiti led by Toussaint L'ouverture British Forces defeated
- 1798 – Large-scale rebellion in Ireland.
- 1799 – Capture of Seringapatam.

== 1801-1898 ==
- 1801 – The United Kingdom of Great Britain and Ireland is formed.
  - French Revolutionary Wars (A campaign to expel a French invasion force in Egypt) takes place.
- 1803 – The Napoleonic Wars begin.
- 1803 – Second Anglo-Maratha War begins, ends 1805
  - 1 September – Battle of Aligarh
  - 11 September – Battle of Delhi
  - 23 September – Battle of Assaye
  - 1 November – Battle of Laswari
  - 28 November – Battle of Argaon
  - 15 December – Battle of Gawilghur
- 1806 – Seizure of the Cape of Good Hope.
  - – An abortive (initially unauthorised) invasion of Spanish South America begins.
- 1808 – The Peninsular War begins.
  - 16 January – Battle of Corunna
- 1810
  - 24 July – Battle of the Côa
  - 25 July – Siege of Almeida (1810)
  - 27 September – Battle of Bussaco
- 1811
  - 19 February – Battle of the Gebora
  - 3 April – Battle of Sabugal
  - 14 April – Siege of Almeida (1811)
  - 3 May – Battle of Fuentes de Onoro
  - 16 May – Battle of Albuera
  - 25 May – Battle of Usagre
  - 28 October – Battle of Arroyo dos Molinos
- 1812 – The War of 1812 against the United States begins.
  - 7 January – Siege of Ciudad Rodrigo
  - 16 March – Battle of Badajoz (1812)
  - 11 April – Battle of Villagarcia
  - 11 June – Battle of Maguilla
  - 22 July – Battle of Salamanca
  - 23 July – Battle of Garcia Hernandez
  - 11 August – Battle of Majadahonda
  - 19 September – Siege of Burgos
  - 23 October – Battle of Venta del Pozo
- 1813
  - 21 June – Battle of Vitoria
  - 7 July – Siege of San Sebastián
  - 25 July – Battle of the Pyrenees
  - 25 July – Battle of Roncesvalles (1813)
  - 25 July – Battle of Maya
  - 28 July – Battle of Sorauren
  - 7 October – Battle of the Bidassoa (1813)
  - 19 November – Battle of Nivelle
  - 9 December – Battle of the Nive
- 1814 – The Gurkha War begins.
  - 15 February – Battle of Garris
  - 27 February – Battle of Orthez
  - 10 April – Battle of Toulouse (1814)
  - 14 April – Battle of Bayonne
- 1815
  - 8 January – Battle of New Orleans
  - 16 June – Battle of Quatre Bras
  - 18 June – The Battle of Waterloo takes place, ending in defeat for the French.
- 1819
  - 16 August – The Peterloo Massacre takes place.
- 1839 – First Anglo-Afghan War begins ends 1842
  - 23 July – Battle of Ghazni
  - September – Siege of Kahun
- 1842
  - 6 January – Battle of Gandamak
  - 15 January – Massacre of Elphinstone's Army
  - August – Battle of Kabul (1842)
- 1854 – The Crimean War begins; ends in 1856.
  - 19 September – The siege of Sevastopol begins.
  - 20 September – The Battle of Alma takes place.
  - 25 October – The Battle of Balaklava takes place; Charge of the Light Brigade.
  - 5 November – The Battle of Inkerman takes place.
- 1855
  - 8 September – The siege of Sevastopol ends.
- 1857 – The Indian Mutiny begins.
  - 30 May – Indian rebels begin the siege of Delhi, siege of Lucknow
  - 5 June – Siege of Cawnpore begins
  - 8 June – Battle of Badli-ki-Serai, siege of Delhi
  - 30 June – Siege of Lucknow begins, Battle of Chinhat
  - 25 August – Battle of Najafgarh
  - 11 October – Battle of Agra
  - 19 November – Second Battle of Cawnpore
- 1858
  - Central India Campaign (1858)
  - 1 March – Capture of Lucknow
- 1859 – Due to fear of invasion by France, a volunteer movement begins, known as the Volunteer Rifle Corps.
- 1870 – The Army withdraws from Australia and New Zealand.
- 1871 – The Army adopts the Martini-Henry rifle, replacing the Snider.
  - – Abolition of the purchase of commission.
- 1878 – Second Anglo-Afghan War begins, ends 1880
  - 21 November – Battle of Ali Masjid
  - 15 December – Siege of the Sherpur Cantonment
- 1879 – The Anglo-Zulu War takes place.
  - 22 January – British force defeated at Battle of Isandlwana.
    - – The defence of Rorke's Drift begins; eleven Victoria Crosses would be gained in the process.
- 1880
  - 19 April – Battle of Ahmed Khel
  - 27 July – Battle of Maiwand
  - 1 September – Battle of Kandahar
  - 20 December – First Boer War begins ends 23 March 1888
  - 20 December – Action at Bronkhorstspruit takes place
- 1881 – Mahdist War begins, ends 1889
  - 28 January – Battle of Laing's Nek
  - 1 July – General Order 70, the culmination of the Cardwell-Childers reforms of the Army's organisation, came into effect.
- 1884
  - 13 March – Battle of Tamai
  - 22 March – Battle of Tofrek
- 1885
  - January – Battle of Abu Klea
  - 28 January – General Charles George Gordon is killed by Mahommed Ahmed (the self-proclaimed Mahdi) after his siege of Khartoum; British relief force arrives two-days later.
  - 8 February – Battle of Schuinshoogte
  - 10 February – Battle of Kirbekan
  - 27 February – Battle of Majuba Hill
  - 30 December – Battle of Ginnis
- 1889 – The Maxim machine gun is introduced.
  - 3 August – Battle of Toski
- 1896
  - 7 June – Battle of Ferkeh
- 1898
  - 8 April – Battle of Atbara
  - 2 September – Battle of Omdurman
  - 24 November – Battle of Umm Diwaykarat

== 1899–1918 ==
=== Second Boer War ===
- 1899
  - 11 October – War is declared.
  - 20 October – The first major battle of the war takes place at Talana Hill.
  - December – "Black Week", in which the Army suffered a series of defeats, takes place.
- 1900
  - 28 February – The siege of Ladysmith is lifted.
  - 1 April – The Irish Guards is formed in honour of the Irish regiments in the Boer War.
  - 17 May – The siege of Mafeking comes to an end.
- 1902
  - 31 May – War ends with the signing of the Treaty of Vereeniging.
- 1905 – The 5th Battalion, The Royal Garrison Regiment is the last British battalion to leave Canada.
- 1908 – The Territorial Force (later Army) is formed.
- 1911
  - 1 April – Following an order issued on 28 February, the Air Battalion Royal Engineers is formed.
- 1912 – The Vickers machine gun is introduced into the Army; it remains in service until 1968.
  - 13 May – The Air Battalion Royal Engineers becomes the Royal Flying Corps. It remains part of the Army.

=== First World War ===
- 1914
  - 4 August – Britain declares war on Germany.
  - August – British Expeditionary Force begins to deploy to France.
  - 19 October – The First Battle of Ypres begins in Belgium.
- 1915
  - 26 February – The Welsh Guards becomes the last Foot Guards regiment to be formed.
  - 25 April – Landings at Helles, Gallipoli.
  - 10 August – Landings at Suvla Bay, Gallipoli.
  - 22 October – The Machine Gun Corps is formed.
- 1916
  - April – The Easter Rising in Dublin takes place .
  - 1 July – The First Day of the Somme begins; about 60,000 casualties are incurred, 20,000 of whom had been killed.
- 1917
  - 28 July – The Heavy Branch of the Machine Gun Corps is split off to form the Tank Corps (later the Royal Tank Regiment).
  - 8 November – About 200 men of the Warwickshire Yeomanry and Worcestershire Yeomanry charge with sabres drawn and defeat an Ottoman battery and a large group of Ottoman infantry at Huj. It was one of the last cavalry charges by the British Army.
  - 20 November – The Battle of Cambrai begins; sees the first large-scale use of tanks.
  - December – The Capture of Jerusalem takes place.
- 1918
  - 11 November – The First World War ends with the signing of the Armistice.

== 1918–1945 ==
=== Interwar Period ===
- January 1919 – Anglo-Irish War begins; British forces combat guerilla operations by the Irish Republican Army.
- 1919 – British Army takes part in Allied intervention during Russian Civil War.
- 28 June 1920 – Winston Churchill as the Secretary of State for War signed the royal warrant which gave the sovereigns approval for the formation of a 'Corps of Signals'. Six weeks later in August, King George V conferred the title 'Royal Corps of Signals'.
- 31 July 1922 – Six Irish regiments (5 infantry and one cavalry) are disbanded due to the establishment of the Irish Free State.
- 1929 – The British Army of the Rhine in Germany is withdrawn.
- 1935 – Abyssinian Crisis takes place; Army deploys substantial reinforcements to Africa and the Middle East.
- 1936 – uprising in Palestine begins.
- 4 April 1939 – The Royal Armoured Corps is formed.

=== Second World War ===
- 3 September 1939 – Britain enters the Second World War when it declares war, along with its Allies, on Nazi Germany.
- September 1939 – British Expeditionary Force begins to land in France.
- 17 May 1940 – The Local Defence Volunteers (later the Home Guard) is formed.
- 20 May 1940– In France, British armoured units counter-attack at Arras.
- 26 May 1940 – The Dunkirk evacuation begins; over 330,000 British and French soldiers are evacuated by 4 June.
- 22 June 1940 – The Parachute Corps (later The Parachute Regiment) is formed.
- April 1941 – Germany invades Crete; Army and Commonwealth forces eventually evacuated by the Royal Navy.
- 25 December 1941 – The garrison at Hong Kong surrenders to the Japanese.
- 15 February 1942 – Singapore garrison surrenders to Japanese forces.
- 23 October 1942 – Second Battle of El Alamein takes place; Montgomery's British Eighth Army defeats the Afrika Korps in offensive.
- 10 July 1943 – The Allied invasion of Sicily begins.
- 3 September 1943 – Invasion of Italian mainland begins.
- March 1944 – The Japanese launch their offensive against India; battles of Imphal and Kohima takes place.
- 1 April 1944 – The Special Air Service Regiment is formed to administer existing SAS units.
- 6 June 1944 – in airborne operations prior to D-Day landings, Pegasus and Horsa Bridges are taken by D Company, 2nd Ox & Bucks, and the Merville gun battery is destroyed by the 9th Parachute Battalion.
- 6 June 1944 – The D-Day landings take place; British Army lands at Gold and Sword; some British units allocated to Canadian beach at Juno.
- 18 July 1944 – Allied armoured offensive, Operation Goodwood, begins.
- September 1944 – Operation Market Garden takes place.
- 24 March 1945 – Airborne crossing of the Rhine, Operation Varsity, takes place.
- 8 May 1945 – VE Day.
- 2 September 1945 – Formal surrender of Japan.

== 1945–1990 ==
- 1 January 1948 – Four Gurkha regiments are transferred from the Indian Army to the British Army, forming the Brigade of Gurkhas.
- 28 February 1948 – The 1st Battalion, Somerset Light Infantry becomes the last British regiment to leave India.
- 1948 – The Malayan Emergency begins.
- 1948 – The Army withdraws from Palestine.
- 1 January 1949 – National Service, the new name for conscription, is introduced.
- 1 February 1949 – The Women's Royal Army Corps is formed.
- 1950 – The Korean War begins.
  - 22 April 1951 – The Battle of the Imjin River takes place.
- 1952 – The Mau Mau uprising in Kenya begins.
- 1953 – The Army withdraws its garrison from Bermuda.
- 1954 – The last troops leave Trieste, having been there since 1945 as part of British Forces Element Trieste.
- 1955 – Occupying troops leave upon Austrian independence.
- June 1956 – Last British troops leave the Suez Canal Zone, Egypt.
- 31 October 1956 – Operation Musketeer, the invasion of Suez begins.
  - 5 November – 3rd Battalion, The Parachute Regiment dropped at El Gamil airfield.
  - 6 November – Amphibious landings take place; Army Centurion tanks land in support.
- 1 September 1957 – The Glider Pilot Regiment was merged with the Air Observation Post Squadrons to form the Army Air Corps.
- 1957 – The Sandys Review of the armed forces takes place.
- 16 July 1958 – Independent Parachute Brigade Group (less 3 Para), air-landed in Amman, Jordan from Cyprus.
- 1961 – Army deploys troops to Kuwait after its request for British to deter invasion by Iraq.
- 1962 – The Brunei uprising takes place.
- 1963 – Last National Serviceman is discharged from the Army.
- 1967 – Withdrawal from Aden after a period of time known as the Aden Emergency.
- 1968 – The only year in the century when the British Army lost no soldiers in action.
- August 1969 – British troops deployed to Northern Ireland to assist in stopping sectarian violence. It is the beginning of "The Troubles".
- 5 May 1980 – Special Air Service ends the Iranian Embassy siege.
- 2 April 1982 – Falklands War begins.
  - 28 May – 2nd Battalion, The Parachute Regiment (2 Para) defeat Argentinians at Goose Green.
  - 8 June – Bombing of RFA's Sir Galahad, Sir Tristram kills 48, including 32 Welsh Guards.
  - 12 June – 3 Para defeats the Argentinians at Mount Longdon.
  - 14 June – 2 Para takes Wireless Ridge.
  - 14 June – 2nd Battalion, Scots Guards defeat Argentinians at Mount Tumbledown.
  - 14 June – Falkland Islands are liberated upon the surrender of Argentinian forces.

== 1990–present ==
- 1991 The Gulf War begins; Army contributes 28,000 troops.
- 1991 – The last British Army regiment leaves Gibraltar. The Gibraltar Regiment is subsequently placed on the Army's regular establishment.
- 6 April 1992 – the WRAC was disbanded and its members integrated into various British Army units.
- 1 October 1992 – I (BR) Corps is disbanded and replaced by the Allied Command Europe Rapid Reaction Corps.
- 1992 – British forces deployed to Bosnia as part of UNPROFOR.
- 31 March 1994 – The British Army of the Rhine is disbanded and replaced by British Forces Germany.
- 1994 – The main force of the Army garrison in Belize is withdrawn; small detachment remains as part of British Army Training and Support Unit Belize.
- 1994 – 1st Battalion, The Queen's Lancashire Regiment becomes the last British battalion to leave Berlin.
- 30 June 1997 – 1st Battalion, The Black Watch (Royal Highland Regiment) becomes the last British unit to leave Hong Kong.
- 1998 – The Strategic Defence Review white paper is published.
- 1999 – Kosovo War begins.
- 2000 – 2 PARA arrived in Freetown, Sierra Leone to evacuate British, Commonwealth and EU citizens.
- 2000 – The Army deploys to the Republic of Macedonia.
- 7 October 2001 – U.S. invasion of Afghanistan begins. The SAS was, initially, the main Army contribution.
  - December 2001 – Major-General John McColl takes command of ISAF in Afghanistan.
- 20 March 2003 – The US-led invasion of Iraq begins.
  - 27 March 2003 – The largest tank engagement by the British Army since WWII takes place; 14 Challenger 2 tanks of the Royal Scots Dragoon Guards destroy 14 Iraqi T-55s.
  - 6 April 2003 – British forces, led by 7 Armoured Brigade (known as 'The Desert Rats') enter Iraq's second city of Basra.
- 21 July 2004 – The defence white paper "Delivering Security in a Changing World" is published.
- March 2005 – Private Johnson Beharry, of the 1st Battalion, Princess of Wales's Royal Regiment is awarded the Victoria Cross for his actions in Iraq.
- 6 April 2005 – The Special Reconnaissance Regiment becomes operational.
- 7 March 2007 – Corporal Bryan Budd, of the 3rd Battalion, the Parachute Regiment, is posthumeously awarded the Victoria Cross.
- March 2007 – Operation Achilles launched to clear Helmand province of the Taliban.
- 31 July 2007 – Operation Banner ends after 38 years of deployment.
- 30 April 2009 – British Army withdraws from Iraq, Operation Telic continues mainly by Royal Navy personnel.
- 10 July 2009 – Five men from 9 Plt, C Coy, 2 RIFLES died and ten were wounded, over half of the entire patrol, in what was the worst casualty toll for a British foot patrol during the war in Afghanistan.
- Summer 2012 – British forces support the police and provide specialist capability during the London 2012 Olympics.
- 16 March 2013 – L/Cpl James Ashworth, of the 1st Battalion, Grenadier Guards is posthumeously awarded the Victoria Cross.
- October 2014 – British Army begins training Iraqi and Peshmerga forces to combat ISIL as part of Operation Shader.
- 26 October 2014 – Combat operations in Afghanistan come to an end, Camp Bastion is handed over to the Afghan National Army.
- 1 January 2015 – Army begins training and mentoring Afghan forces and providing force protection as part of NATO's Resolute Support Mission.
- 26 February 2015 – L/Cpl Joshua Leakey, of the Parachute Regiment is awarded the Victoria Cross.
- May 2016 – British Army deployment begins in Malakal and Bentiu, South Sudan to support the United Nations Mission in South Sudan.
- 17 March 2017 – British Army begins deploying to Estonia and Poland in support of NATO Enhanced Forward Presence.
- 22 May 2017 – Operation Temperer is put into effect following the Manchester Arena bombing.
- February 2020 – Completion of the withdrawal of British Forces Germany.
- April 2020 – British Army begins deploying troops to Mali to form a Long Range Reconnaissance Group (LRRG) Task Group as part of MINUSMA.
- 13 August 2021 – Operation Pitting begins, 600 military personnel deployed to Kabul International Airport.
- 15 August 2021 – Fall of Kabul, Taliban control Afghanistan.
- 28 August 2021 – Evacuation of British nationals, embassy staff and eligible Afghans ends.
- 25 November 2021 – The Future Soldier programme is published.
- 1 December 2021 – The Ranger Regiment is formed.
- 24 February 2022 – Russia invades Ukraine.
- July 2022 – Operation Interflex launched, British Army begins training Ukrainian service personnel in the UK.
- 8 September 2022 – Death of Queen Elizabeth II, King Charles III accedes to the throne and becomes Commander-in-Chief of the British Army.
- 18 September 2022 – Thousands of British Army personnel form part of HM The Queen's funeral procession.
- 6 April 2023 – The Yorkshire Regiment becomes The Royal Yorkshire Regiment.
- September 2023 – Exercise Iron Titan takes place, the largest British Army exercise for over twenty years.
- October 2023 – 1st Battalion The Princess of Wales’s Royal Regiment is rapidly deployed to Kosovo in response to heightened regional tension.
