= Magach =

Series of Israeli Tanks

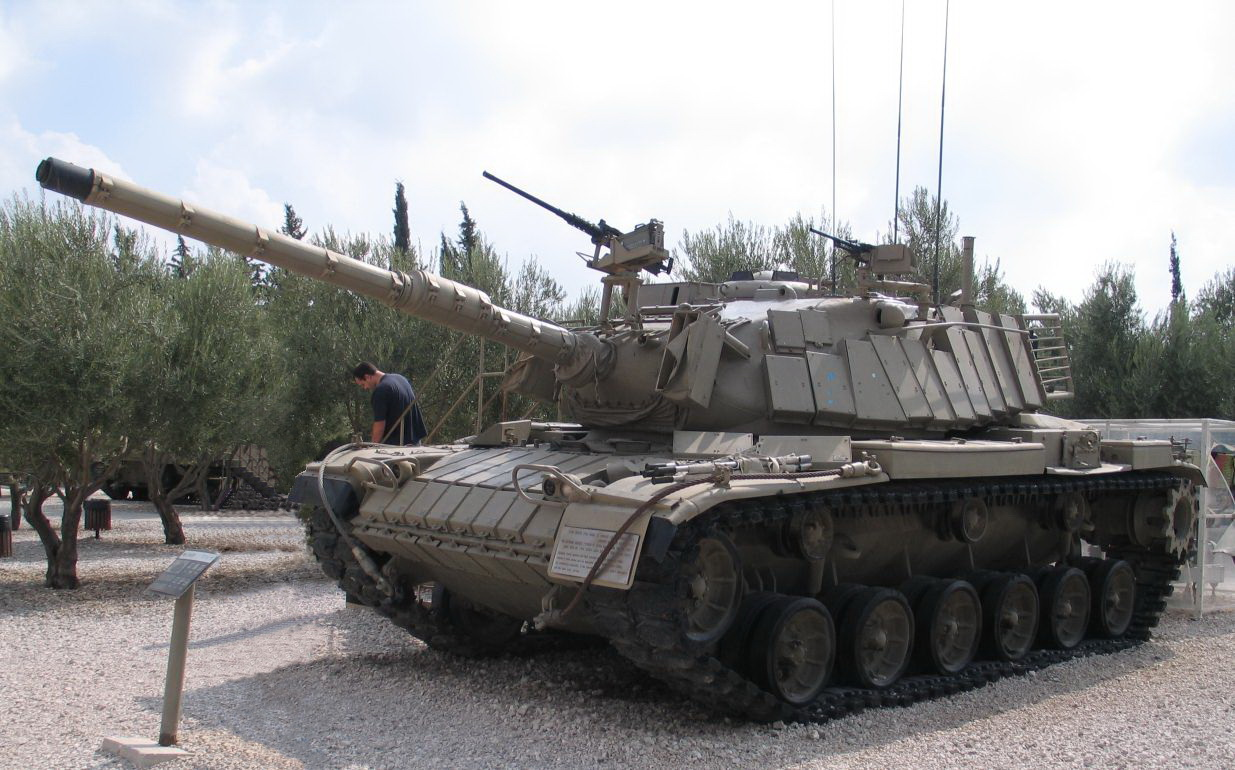
Magach 6B in the Yad La-Shiryon Armored Corps Memorial and Museum, Latrun

Magach (Hebrew: מגח, Hebrew pronunciation: [mə'gæχ], "battering-ram") is the designation of a series of tanks in Israeli service. The tanks are based on the American M48 and M60 tanks. The name continued to be used for all M48/M60 tanks. Magach 1, 2, 3, and 5 are based on M48 series tanks, and Magach 6 and 7 are based on M60 series tanks.

== Service history ==
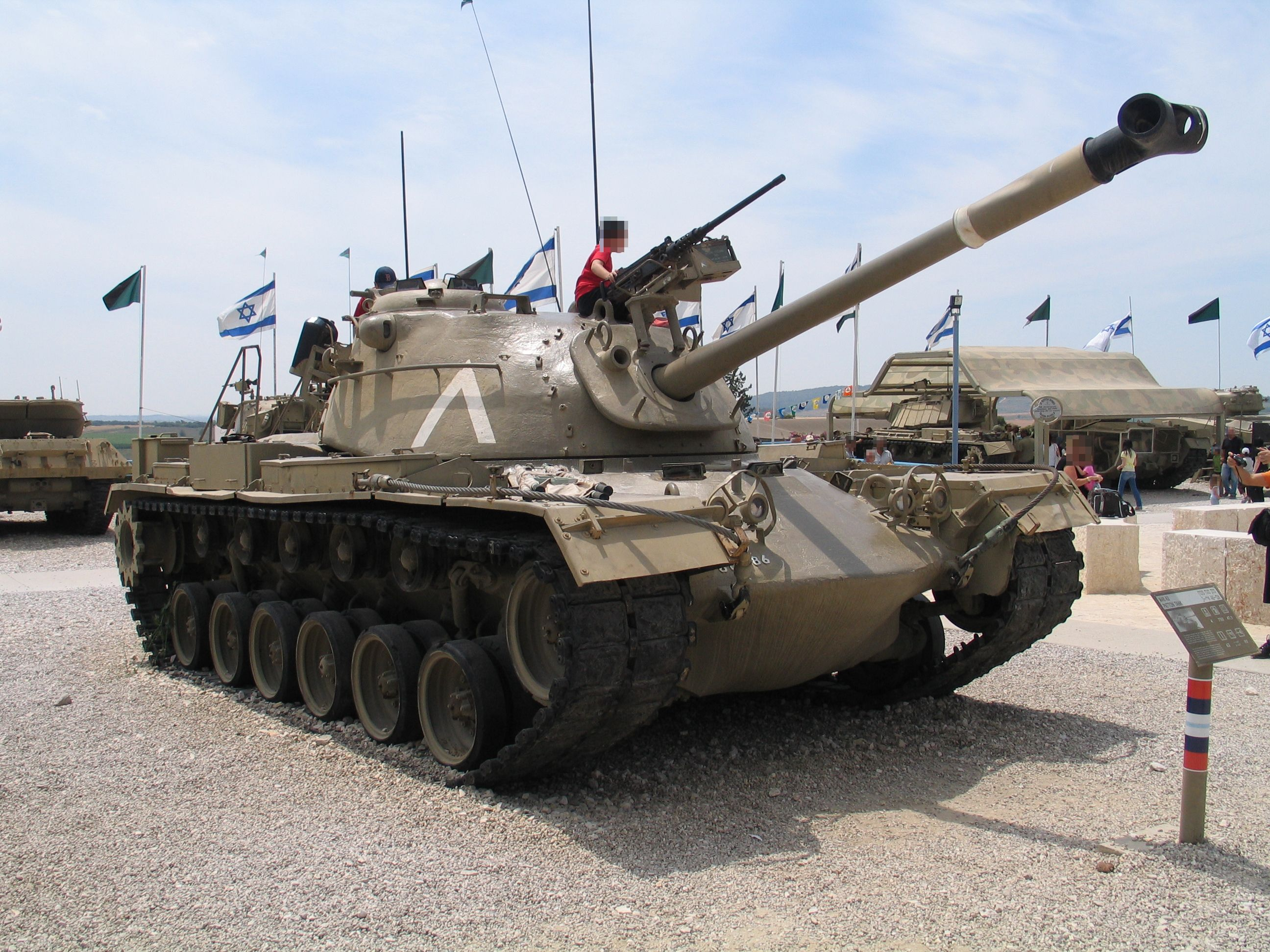
Magach 2 in Yad la-Shiryon museum, Latrun

The first M48 Patton tanks acquired by the Israel Defense Forces (IDF) were purchased from West Germany in the early 1960s (M48A2 variant) in a secret arms deal, followed by deliveries from the United States after 1965 (M48A1 and M48A2C vehicles) when Germany cancelled further deliveries after the deal was exposed.

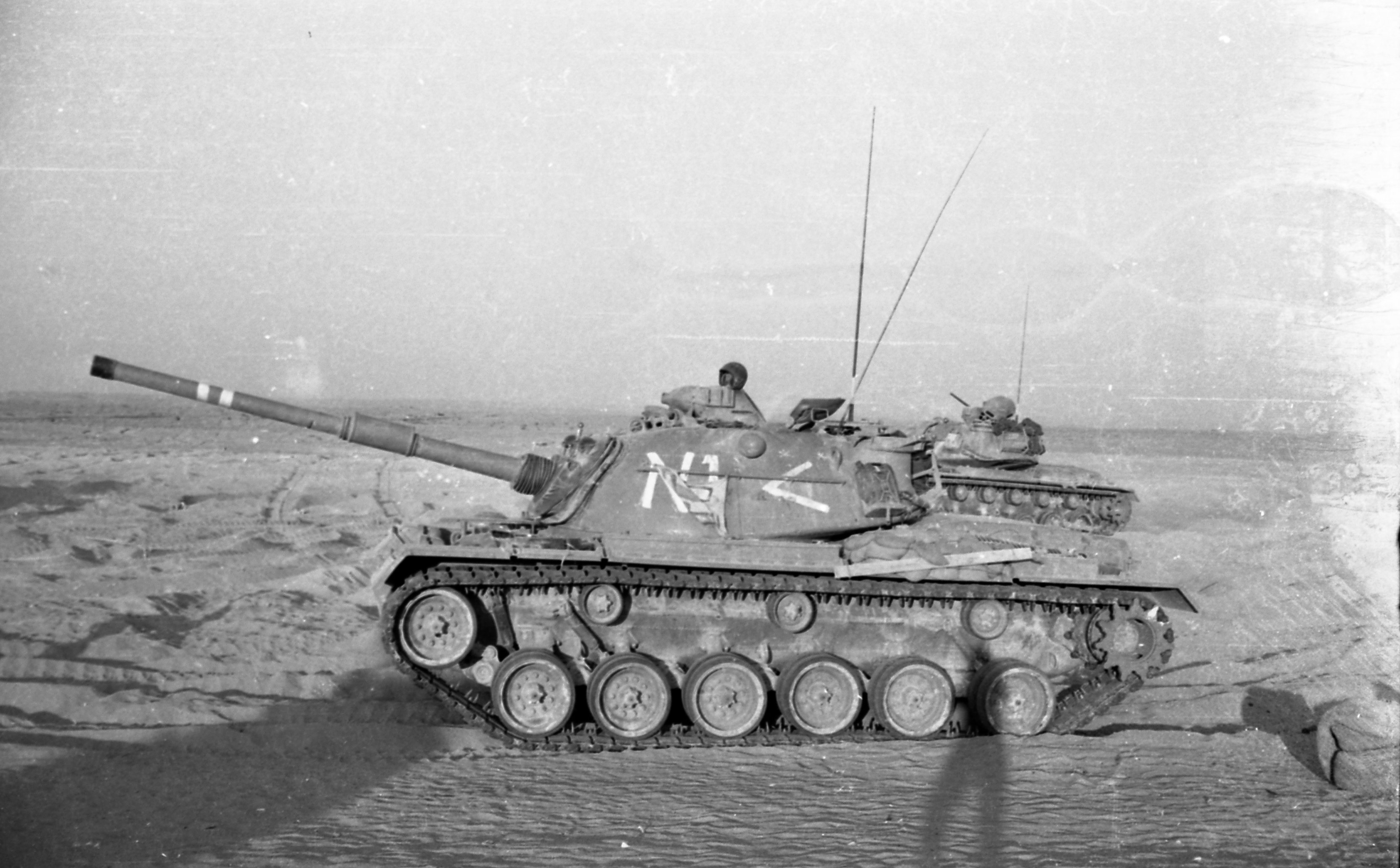
Magach 3 in Sinai, 1969

During the Six-Day War, the Israeli tanks served in their original (American) configuration. Following the war, several dozen Jordanian M48 tanks that had been captured intact were also commissioned into the IDF, adding to the 150 already in service at that time. Israel also modified the tank to the M48A3 automotive standard by replacing the 650 hp (480 kW) gasoline engine with a 750 hp (560 kW) diesel engine with more power and a reduced vulnerability to fuel fires, resulting in the Magach 3. These modifications also included replacing the original 90 mm gun with the British 105 mm L7 (US M68 equivalent), replacing the commander's machine gun cupola with a lower-profile Urdan Cupola, and upgrading the communication suite.

When the Yom Kippur War broke out, Israel had 540 M48-series (with 105 mm gun) and M60/M60A1 tanks. During the war, the tanks suffered heavy losses. The location of flammable hydraulic fluid at the front of the turret was discovered to be a severe vulnerability. Egypt had destroyed a large number of Israeli tanks, and only 200 M48 and M60A1 tanks remained. Israel entrenched most of these tanks in the Sinai front against opposite entrenched Egyptian infantry armed with 9M14 Malyutka anti tank missiles. Israel replaced their war losses with new M48A5 (Magach 5), M60 (Magach 7), and M60A1 (Magach 6) during the 1970s. The older M60's (which still used the smaller M48-style turret) were supplied to make up for a shortage of sufficient M60A1s, explaining why the older model has the higher designation.

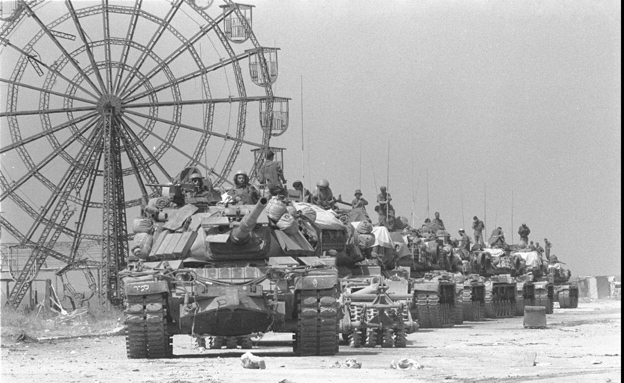
Columns of Magach 6B in Lebanon, 1982

Prior to the 1982 invasion of Lebanon, Magach 6 and 7 tanks were fitted with explosive reactive armor (ERA). Further work has been done on the upgraded Magach 6 models, including new belly armor, Merkava tracks, new fire controls, a thermal sleeve for the gun and smoke grenades, eventually resulting in the Magach 6b (Bet) and ultimate 6b Gal Batash and equivalent Magach 7c Gimel models.

Since the 1980s and 1990s, the Magachs have been gradually replaced by Merkava tanks as Israel's front-line main battle tank. However, a large majority of the IDF's armored corps continued to consist of Magach variants until the 1990s, and the tank was continuously upgraded during this time.

By 2006, all Magachs in regular units had been replaced by Merkavas.

In July 2015, Israel officially unveiled the Pereh missile carrier. The Pereh is a guided missile carrier disguised as a tank. A Magach is converted into a Pereh tank destroyer by replacing the main battle gun with an anti-tank guided missile launch station. The original turret is enlarged to install a launcher under armor for 12 "Tamuz" Spike NLOS missiles, which can destroy targets out to 25 km (16 mi). Disguised as a standard tank, the Pereh is fitted with a fake cannon barrel to the front, but can be identified easily by the curved antenna mounted at the rear on the roof of the turret, which is erected in firing position; additional features include add-on frontal armor and stowage boxes on the turret sides. Pictures of the Pereh were first released during Operation Protective Edge in July 2014.

== Source of the name "Magach" ==
Contrary to a popular belief, "Magach" is not an abbreviation but a Hebrew word meaning "battering-ram". However, as the word is very rarely used and is not known to many Hebrew speakers, several popular explanation backronyms of the name exist:

- Short for Merkavat Giborei Chayil (Hebrew: מרכבת גיבורי חיל, literally Chariots of War Heroes).
- One version states that the real source of the name is the designation M48A3 (in Gematria, 40 is "mem" ("m"), 8 is "chet" ("ch") and 3 is "gimel" ("g")).
- Like the above, but "g" stands for Germany, a supplier of the first M48 tanks to Israel.
- Yet another version says that M48A3 can be read as MAgAch (4 looks like "A", 8 like "g" etc.).
- A once popular macabre joke in the IDF said that "Magach" stands for "Movil Gviyot Charukhot"—"charred bodies carrier", probably referring to the Yom Kippur War losses and particularly to the aforementioned flammable hydraulic fluid problem of the M48.
- Other variants include "Meshupa Gahon" (one with sloping belly) and even "Mechonat Giluach Hashmalit" (electric shaving machine).

== Versions ==
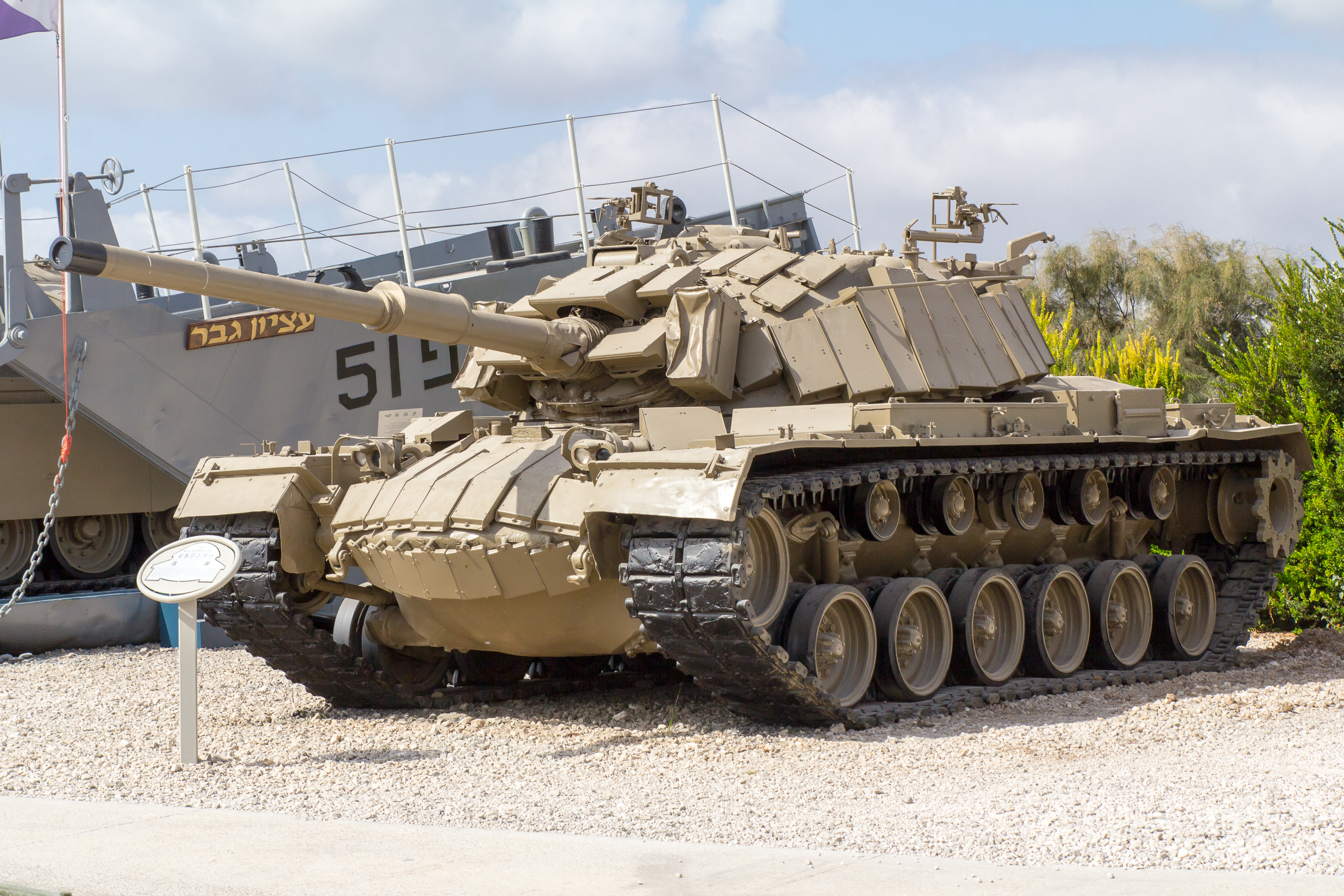
Magach 3 with Blazer ERA and Urdan cupola

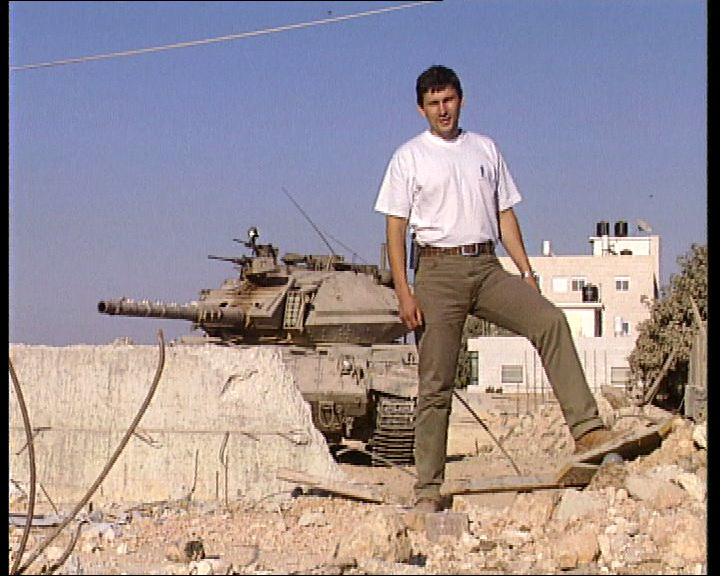
Magach 6B Gal Batash

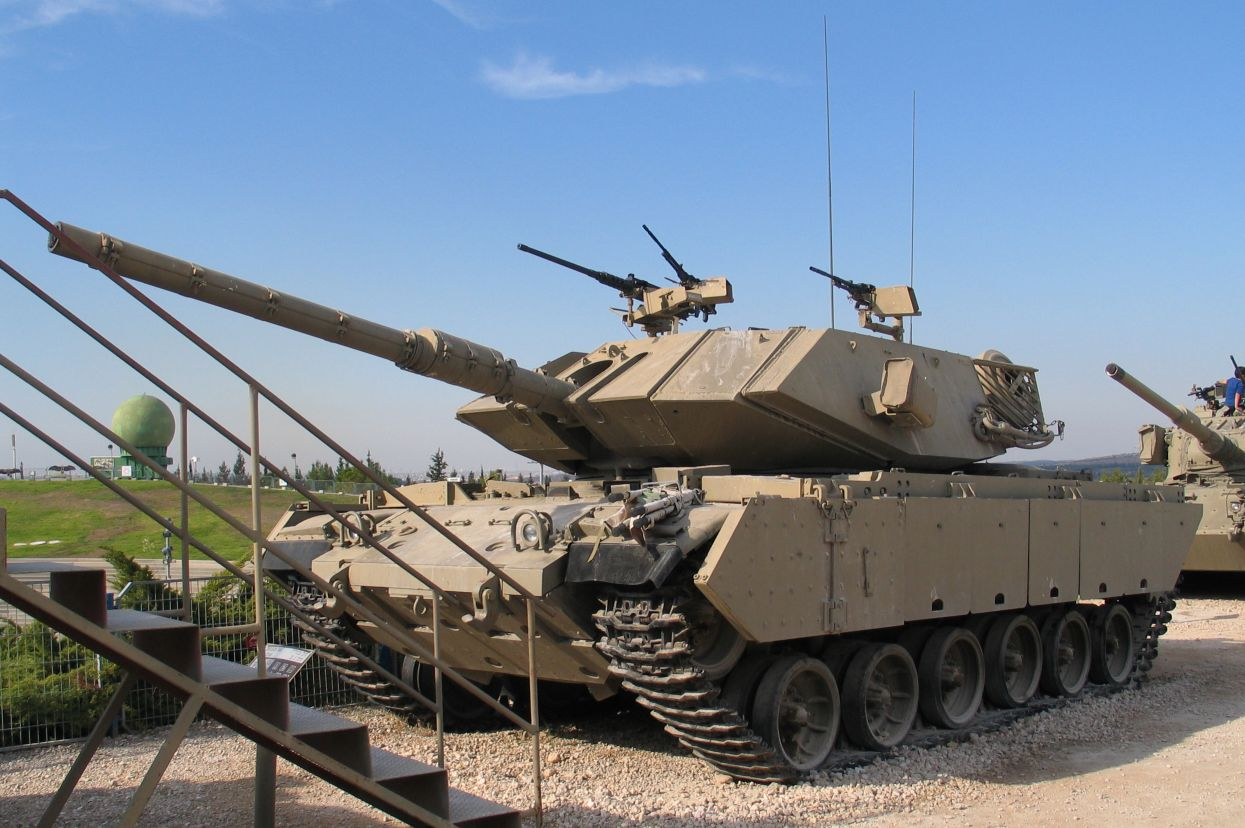
Magach 7C in Yad la-Shiryon museum

- Magach 1: M48A1.
- Magach 2: M48A2C.
- Magach 3: Modernized M48A1/A2C/A3. The modifications included British 105 mm L7 cannon, low profile commander's cupola, upgraded communication suite, a 750 hp (560 kW) diesel engine Continental AVDS-1790-2A with Allison CD-850-6 transmission. They were eventually fitted with Blazer ERA.
- Magach 5: M48A5 in the original configuration. Generally similar to the Magach 3, but had slightly different engine and transmission—AVDS-1790-2D and CD-850-6A accordingly. They were eventually fitted with Blazer ERA.
- Magach 6: Modernized M60A1 or M60A3. Fitted with the Urdan low profile cupola and Blazer ERA.
  - Magach 6A (6 Alef): Modernized M60A1. All vehicles were eventually upgraded to the Magach 6B level.
  - Magach 6B (6 Bet): Similarly modernized M60A1 RISE (M60A1 with AVDS-1790-2C RISE (Reliability Improved Selected Equipment) engine).
  - Magach 6B Gal (6 Bet Gal): Magach 6B with Gal fire control system.
  - Magach 6B Gal Batash (6 Bet Gal Batash): Magach 6B Gal fitted with 4th generation passive armor and 908 hp (677 kW) engine. The turret has angled sides and angled mantlet. This variant is sometimes unofficially referred to as Magach 7D or Magach 8. A limited number of vehicles were converted from the Magach 6B Gal variant.
  - Magach 6B Baz (6 Bet Baz): Magach 6B fitted with Baz fire control system. A limited number of vehicles were converted from the Magach 6B variant.
  - Magach 6C (6 Gimel): Modernized M60A3.
  - Magach 6R (6 Resh): Modernized M60, with engine upgraded to the AVDS-1790-2AG level (with more powerful electric generator compared to that of AVDS-1790-2A).
  - Magach 6R* (6 Resh*): Magach 6R with preparations for mounting Nachal Oz fire control system.
  - Magach 6M (6 Mem): Magach 6R* fitted with Nachal Oz fire control system.
- Magach 7: M60 with 908 hp (677 kW) AVDS-1790-5A engine, additional passive armor, new fire control and Merkava-based tracks. Different configurations exist:
  - Magach 7A (7 Alef): Fixed flat mantlet with gun "slots".
  - Magach 7B (7 Bet): An interim model with armor configuration similar to the 7C. Apparently never reached production.
  - Magach 7C (7 Gimel): Fixed angled mantlet with gun "slots".
- Pereh missile carrier: Guided missile artillery variant armed with the Spike missile.
- Magachon: Heavy APC variant dropped in favour of HAPCs converted from the Centurion Nagmachon because they are easier to convert and provide better protection.

Magach should not be confused with the Sabra series of upgrade packages for the M60A1/A3, which were developed for export to Turkey. Sabra includes upgrades similar to those of the Magach 7, but an essential difference is that it is armed with the MG251 120 mm smooth-bore gun (the same as used by the Merkava 3).

== Operators ==
- Israel

== See also ==
- M60-2000 Main Battle Tank

== Bibliography ==
- Brezner, Amiad (December 2008). "בֵּין גְּבוּלוֹת" [Rammed] (PDF). Shiryon (in Hebrew). No. 30. Archived from the original (PDF) on 2010-12-14..
- Mass, Michael. MAGACH 6B GAL AND GAL BATASH [M60A1 IN IDF SERVICE PAT II]. Archived from the original on 2016-11-25..
