= Sabra (tank upgrade package) =

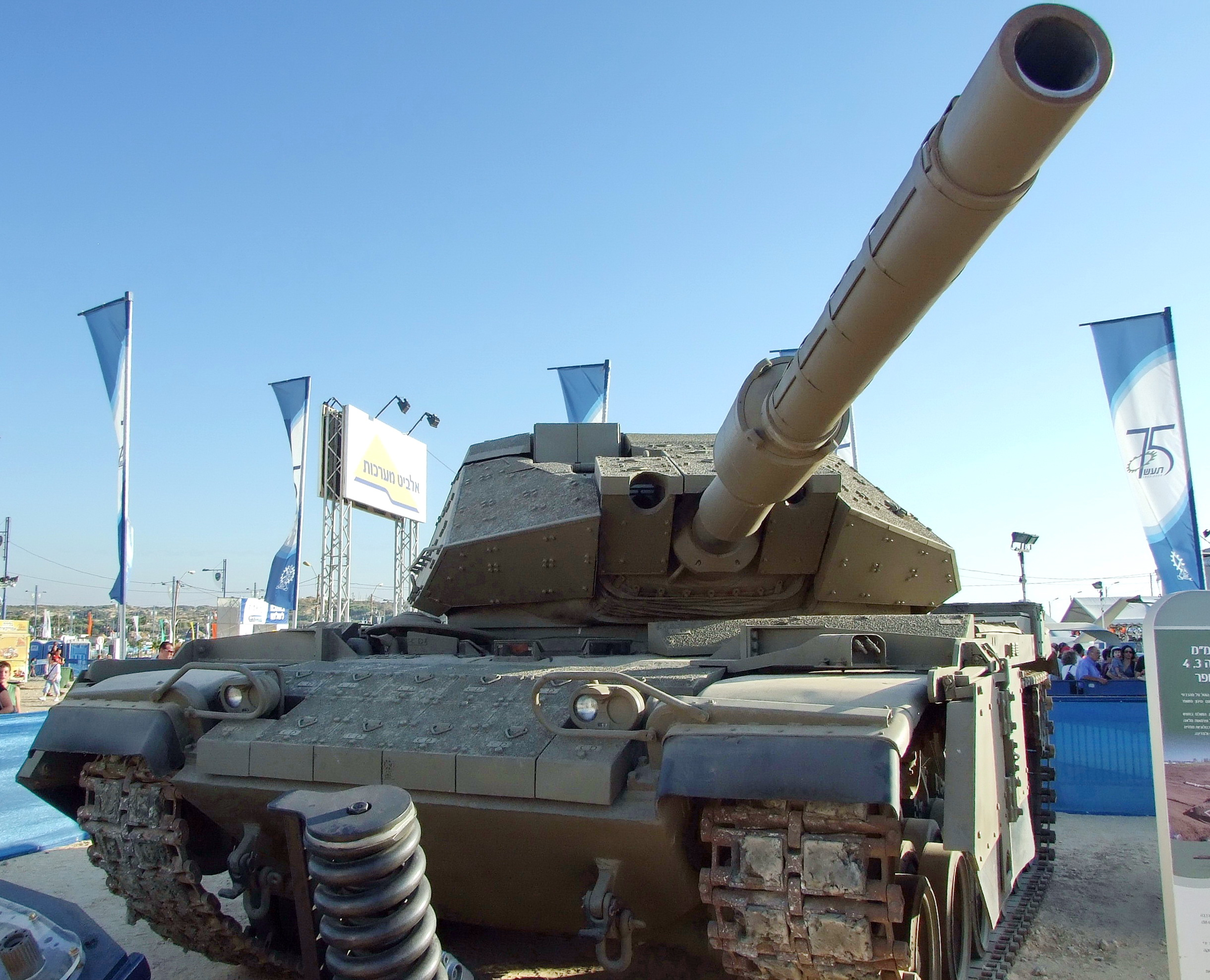
- Turkish M60 upgraded with the Sabra Mk II package
- Type: Main battle tank

Service history
- In service: 2007–present
- Used by: Turkish Land Forces

Production history
- Designer: Israel Military Industries
- Manufacturer: Israel Military Industries; ROKETSAN (under license)
- Unit cost: $3.13 million (Sabra Mk. 1); $3.36 million (Sabra Mk. 2)

Specifications
- Mass: 55 tonnes (61 short tons; 54 long tons) (Mk I); 59 tonnes (65 short tons; 58 long tons) (Mk II)
- Length: 6.95 m (22.8 ft)
- Width: 3.63 m (11.9 ft)
- Height: 3.27 m (10.7 ft)
- Crew: 4
- Armor: Steel laminate (Mk I); Explosive reactive armor (Mk II~)
- Main armament: 120 mm MG253 gun
- Secondary armament: 7.62 mm M240 coaxial weapon; 7.62 mm MG3A1 machine gun; 12.7 mm M85 machine gun; 60 mm internal mortar
- Engine: Continental AVDS-1790-5A diesel engine (Mk I); MTU MT 881 KA-501 diesel engine (Mk II & III); 908 hp (677 kW) (Mk I); 1,000 hp (750 kW) (Mk II & III)
- Power/weight: 16.95 hp/ton (Mk.II)
- Payload capacity: 42 rounds (main gun); 900 rounds (secondary gun)
- Transmission: Allison CD850-6BX (Mk. I); Renk 304S transmission (Mk II & III)
- Suspension: Independent, trailing arm
- Fuel capacity: 200 L (44 imp gal; 53 US gal) (internal fuel)
- Operational range: 450 km (280 mi) (all variants)
- Maximum speed: 48 km/h (30 mph) (Mk I); 55 km/h (34 mph) (Mk II & III)

The Sabra (Hebrew: סברה, "prickly pear") is a family of tank upgrade package developed by Israel Military Industries for export market. The Mk II version of this upgrade package was used in one of the three Turkish Army's modernization programs of M60T tanks.

== Overview ==
The Sabra was initially developed as a further evolution of the Magach 7C. The ballistic profile of the appliqué armor was improved and it incorporated the MG253 120 mm gun developed by IMI. The upgrade package was first offered to Turkey as an option for its tank modernization program and later offered for general export. The Turkish government selected the Sabra Mk II (a further modified version of the Sabra) for its upgrade program, which was intended as a stopgap measure. A contract estimated to be worth $687 million USD was signed on March 29, 2002. The first Sabra Mk II was delivered for Turkish trials in 2005 and passed qualifications in May, 2006. 170 were upgraded between 2007 and April 2009. The upgrades were undertaken by the Turkish Army's 2nd Main Maintenance Center Command, with upgrade kits supplied by IMI.

== Variants ==
Sabra Mk I

The Mk I was essentially an upgraded Magach 7C. It incorporated a new 120 mm gun developed by IMI, improved applique armor, and the Knight fire control system from Elbit Systems. The running gear would also be upgraded from the Magach to improve cross-country mobility. The hybrid electric and hydraulic turret traverse system from the Magach 7C is replaced with an all-electric system.

Sabra Mk II / M60T

Unlike the Mk I which used a low-profile commander's cupola, the Mk II retained the larger M60 Patton style M19 cupola with the M85 12.7 mm machine gun found on the M60s in Turkish service. The Mk II also uses a more powerful MTU Friedrichshafen engine built under license in Turkey (MTU Turk A.S.), and a Renk transmission with four forward and two reverse gears. The Mk II is also equipped with explosive reactive armor. Total 170 M60A1 tanks of the Turkish Land Forces were upgraded by the Turkish military's 2nd Main Maintenance Center with Sabra Mk II package to M60T with Israeli cooperation. Most of the systems except the armor package were built under license, benefiting from technology transfer within Turkey. The Sabra can carry 500 litres of diesel fuel.

Sabra Mk III

The Sabra Mk III incorporates armor technology, cannon, the RWR/IR warning system, and tracks from the Merkava Mk IV.

== Users ==
- Turkey – 170 Sabra Mk II upgrade packages sold to the Turkish Land Forces.

== See also ==
- Magach, served as the starting point for the Sabra design.
- M60-2000, an alternative upgrade option from General Dynamics Land Systems which was also offered to Turkey.
