= M60T tank =

M60T / M60TM / M60T1
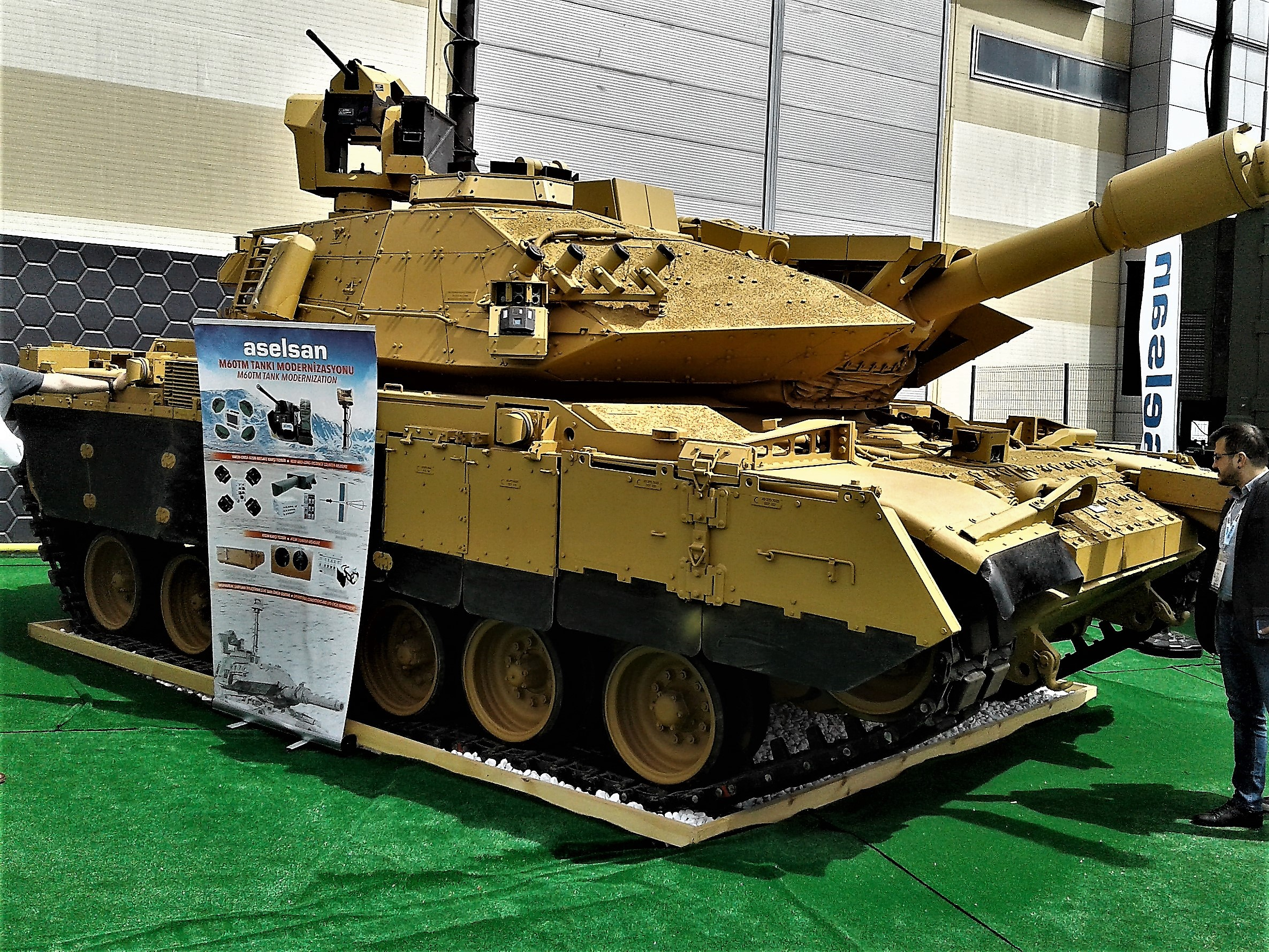
- M60TM at the 2019 International Defence Industry Fair
- Type: Main battle tank
- Place of origin: M60T: Israel; M60TM: Turkey; M60T1: Turkey

Service history
- In service: 2007–present
- Used by: Turkish Land Forces
- Wars: Kurdish–Turkish conflict; Iraqi Civil War; Syrian Civil War

Production history
- Designer: M60T: Israel Military Industries
- Manufacturer: M60T prototypes: Israel Military Industries; M60T: 2nd Main Maintenance Center Command; M60T1: 2nd Main Maintenance Factory Directorate
- No. built: M60T: 170; M60TM: 169

Specifications
- Mass: 59 tonnes (65 short tons; 58 long tons)
- Length: 6.95 m (22.8 ft)
- Width: 3.63 m (11.9 ft)
- Height: 3.27 m (10.7 ft)
- Armor: M60T: Composite and ERA; M60T1: Roketsan armor package (add-on)
- Main armament: IMI MG253 120 mm smoothbore gun
- Secondary armament: Remote controlled weapon station (M60TM); 40mm grenade launcher (M60TM)
- Engine: MTU diesel engine
- Maximum speed: 55 km/h (34 mph)

The M60T is a modernized M60A1 main battle tank (MBT) operated by the Turkish Land Forces. The initial M60T was developed with the Israeli Sabra upgrade package. The M60T was upgraded into the M60TM in response to combat experience from Turkish involvement in the Syrian civil war in 2016; the upgrades made greater use of domestic component and included adding an active protection system (APS) and improved situational awareness. The M60T1 is a further upgrade that was in progress by 2022 and includes domestic electronics and armor package.

== Description ==
=== M60T ===
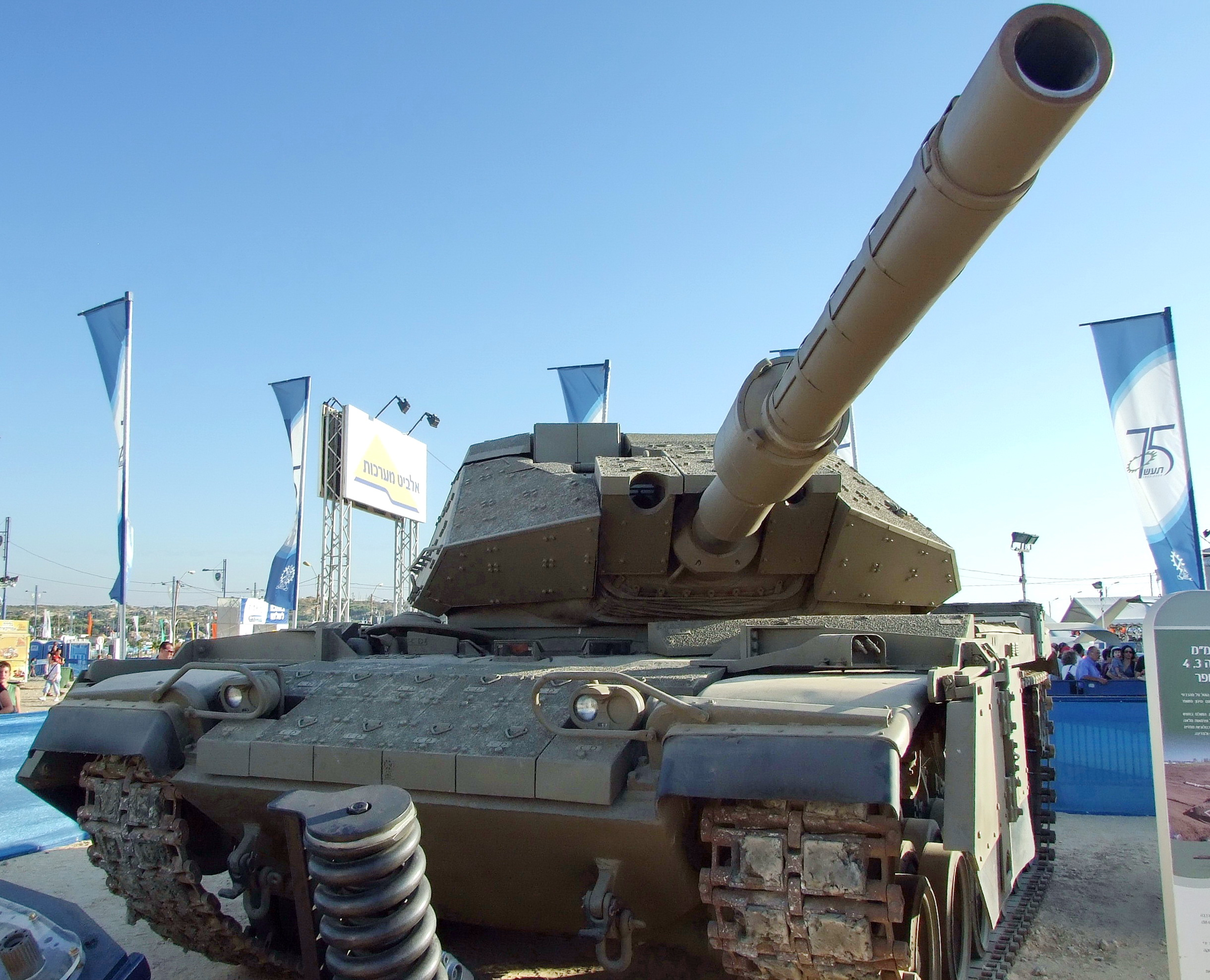
M60T displayed in Israel in 2008.

The M60T, or Sabra Mk II, is an upgraded M60A1. The upgrade includes the Israeli IMI MG253 smoothbore 120-mm L44 gun, composite and explosive reactive armour modules, and a more powerful MTU diesel engine.

=== M60TM ===
The M60TM is an upgraded M60T. The major additions are Aselsan's Pulat active protection system (APS) and Aselsan's Telescopic Periscope System (TEPES); only a subset of the upgraded tanks received these systems. Six Pulat countermeasures are mounted; two on each side, and one each to the front and rear. To an extent it is effective against top attack weapons. Pulat fires ammunition developed by TÜBİTAK SAGE TEPES permits surveillance and target acquisition when in defilade; it is integrated with the laser warning receiver and remote controlled weapon station, which are also part of the upgrade package. Other parts of the upgrade package include a position and orientation detection system, close-range surveillance system, tank driver vision system, spall liner, air conditioning and auxiliary power unit.

=== M60T1 ===
The M60T1 is an upgraded M60T with additional domestic systems. It adds Aselsan's Volkan-M fire-control system; STM Savunma's Tank Command, Control, Communication Information System; a Roketsan armor package; and new crew seats from T-Kalıp.

== History ==
In 2001, Turkey cancelled negotiations with Israel for Israeli assistance in upgrading Turkey's 170 M60 tanks. Turkey found the proposed US$700 million price and the degree of Turkish industrial participation, valued at US$75 million to be unacceptable. Turkey sought new bids in 2002. The Turkish Undersecretariat for Defence Industries (SSM). awarded the US$700 million contract to IMI. The agreement included a transfer of technology, excluding the composite armor, and IMI setting up a production line at the Turkish Army Repair and Maintenance Facility in Kayseri for US$100 million with Turkish subcontractors. Turkey witheld a project progress payment in January 2005 when IMI missed the deadline to deliver the prototype. In May 2005, the tank was demonstrated to Turkish officials at an Israel Defense Forces base in the southern Negev. Officially, both parties expressed satisfaction with the progress of the program. Strike action at IMI against the Israeli Ministry of Finance in 2005 may have interfered. The remaining tanks were upgraded at the Turkish 2nd Main Maintenance Center Command in Kayseri. The tanks were designated M60T.

In 2016 during the Turkey–Islamic State conflict, a M60T training Iraqi forces in Bashiqah was hit by a 9M133 Kornet anti-tank guided missile (ATGM) fired by Islamic State (IS) troops. The tank was hit in the turret and disabled; the crew survived.

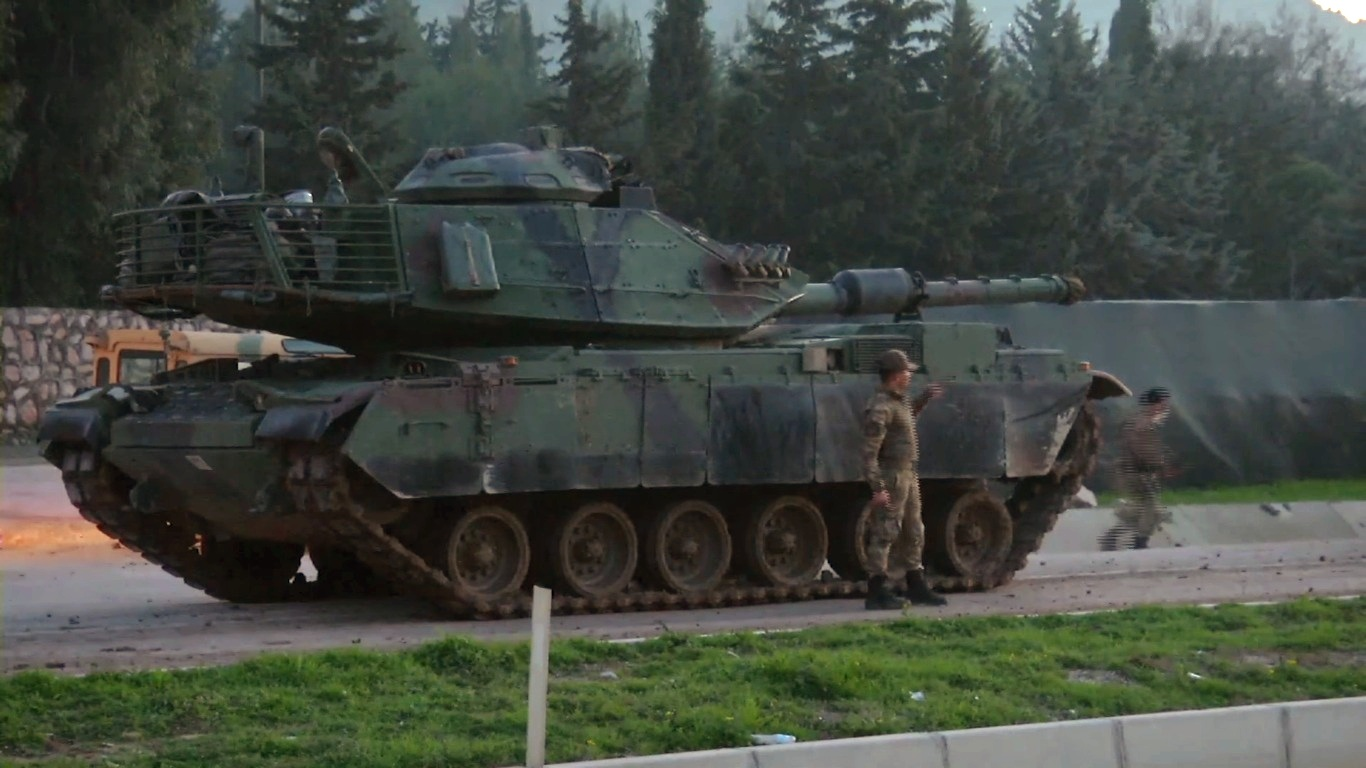
M60T during Operation Olive Branch

M60Ts were deployed into Syria as part of the Turkish involvement in the Syrian Civil War in support of the Syrian National Army (SNA). In 2016, during Operation Euphrates Shield, M60Ts were hit by IS anti-tank weapons on at least two occasions. The experience from Euphrates Shield led to the development of the M60TM under the FIRAT-M60T Project. The Turkish Presidency of Defence Industries (SSB) began issuing contracts began being signed in 2017. 169 tanks were to be upgraded. Upgrades included the Pulat APS, to be fitted to 40 tanks, and the Telescopic Periscope System, to be fitted to 73. All M60Ts were upgraded by mid-2020. Pulat APS-equipped M60TMs were deployed as part of the 2019 Turkish offensive into northeastern Syria. The M60TM reportedly performed well against ATGMs and in urban warfare.

The M60T1 was developed under the "Project to Provide Additional Capabilities to Tanks" (TİYK). The upgrade project was underway by July 2022. The upgrades were performed by the 2nd Main Maintenance Factory Directorate in Kayseri. The first two tanks were delivered to the Turkish army in early-2024.

== Users ==
Turkey

- Turkish Land Forces: 165 M60TM as of 2024

== Sources ==
- Akalin, Cem (2020). "Modernized M60TM MBTS will be a Force Multiplier in Theatre" (PDF). Defence Turkey Magazine. Vol. 14, no. 100.
- Kogan, Eugene (September 2005). Cooperation in the Israeli-Turkish Defence Industry (PDF) (Report). Conflict Studies Research Centre, Defence Academy of the United Kingdom. ISBN 1-905058-38-1. Middle East Series 05/43. Archived (PDF) from the original on 16 November 2024.
- International Institute for Strategic Studies (2025). The Military Balance 2025. London: Routledge. p. 245-246. ISBN 978-1-041-04967-8.
- Yeşiltaş, Murat; Seren, Merve; Özçelik, Necdet (November 2017). Operation Euphrates Shield: Implementation and Lessons Learned (PDF) (Report). Ankara: SETA Foundation for Political, Economic and Social Research. ISBN 978-975-2459-39-7.
