= Pereh =

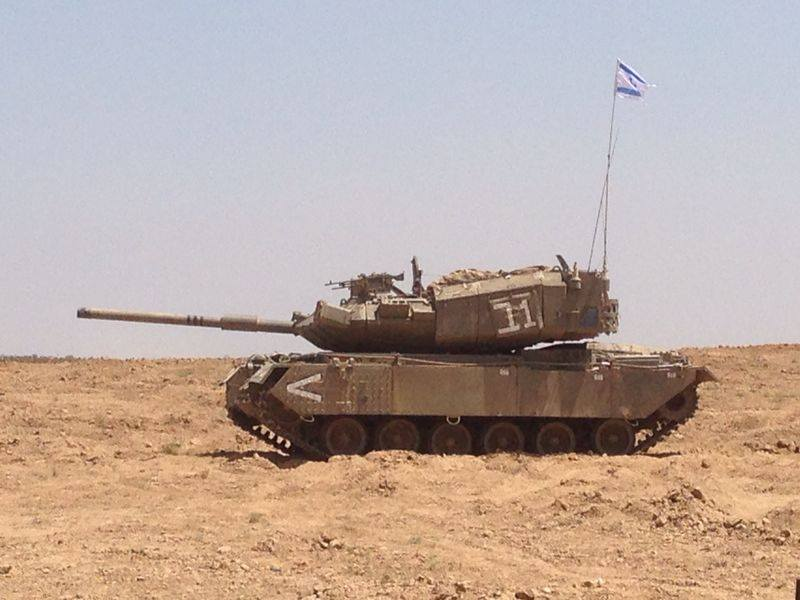
- A Pereh operating during the Gaza War.
- Type: Anti-tank missile carrier
- Place of origin: Israel

Service history
- In service: 1980s–2017
- Used by: Israel
- Wars: 2006 Lebanon War; Gaza War; 2014 Israel–Gaza conflict

Production history
- Designer: Rafael Advanced Defense Systems
- Manufacturer: Rafael Advanced Defense Systems

Specifications
- Mass: Around 65 Tons
- Length: 9.3 Metres
- Width: 3.65 Metres
- Height: 3.1 Metres
- Crew: 4
- Main armament: 12 Spike-NLOS missiles
- Secondary armament: Two FN MAG machine guns
- Engine: Diesel Engine; 900 Horsepower
- Suspension: Torsion bar suspension
- Operational range: Around 500 kilometres
- Maximum speed: Around 50 km/h

The Pereh (Hebrew: פרא: Wild or Onager) is an Israeli anti-tank missile carrier, disguised as a tank. Serving the Israel Defense Forces in the role of precision artillery since the mid 1980s, the existence and nature of the vehicle was declassified in June 2015.

== Description ==
The Pereh is based on the hull of the Magach 5 tank and features an enlarged turret containing 12 Spike missiles in a pop-up missile launcher at the rear disguised as a turret bustle. The launcher is reloaded via a hatch at the rear with the launcher in the lowered position. Known as the Tamuz in Israeli service, the Spike-NLOS missile is capable of being used in both fire and forget and man-in-the-loop modes, either in the direct or indirect fire roles, and is able to destroy targets out to 25 km (16 mi). The front is fitted with a fake cannon to disguise it as a standard tank, but when deployed it can be identified by a curved antenna mounted at the rear on the roof of the turret, which is erected in the firing position. Other additional features include add-on frontal armor and storage boxes on the turret sides.

== Development ==
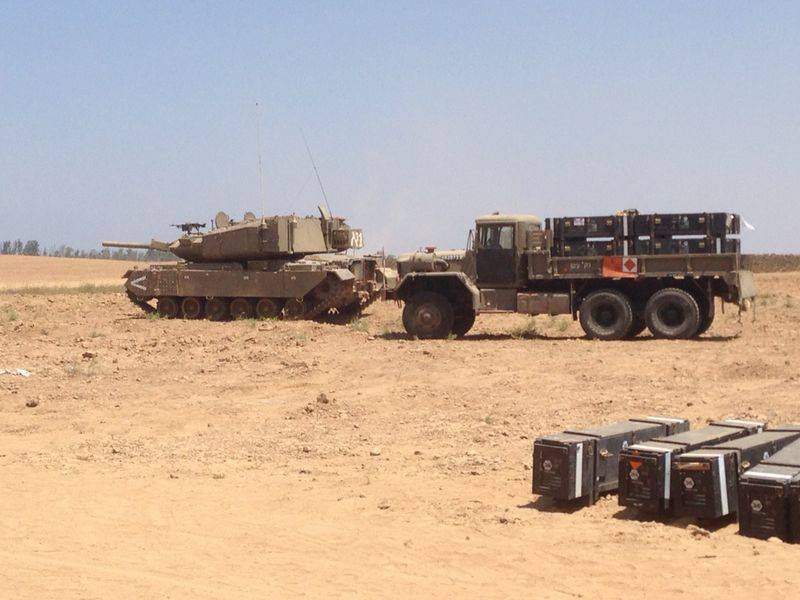
Pereh and reloading vehicle in a laager during the Gaza War

The Pereh was developed in the 1980s in tandem with the Spike-NLOS (called the Tamuz in service) missile, but was not revealed to the public until 2011. The concept of the Tamuz and the Pereh was conceived during the Yom Kippur War, where Israel seemed to be in danger of being overrun by Egyptian armor. The eventual nature of the weapon system and the operational doctrine of its deployment were furthered by Israeli experience against Syrian T-72 tanks during the First Lebanon War.

== Operational history ==
The Pereh had participated in all Israeli Defense Force operations of the last 25 years including the 2006 Lebanon War and Gaza War. Although pictures of the Pereh have been taken over the years, with some appearing in public briefly, Israeli censors have been diligent in suppressing such appearances. Pictures of the Pereh first released during Operation Protective Edge in July 2014, was the first occasion on which the censors allowed such pictures to pass without suppression, though no statement was made as to what the pictures were of.

The Pereh was retired from service in 2017, although it is unclear whether the Israeli Defense Force intends to abandon the concept, or if they plan using a more modern tank chassis in an updated version.

== Operators ==
- Israel

== See also ==
- Military deception
- Multi-Mission Effects Vehicle, an attempt to integrate an indirect fire option to ADATS
- Valkiri, South African multiple rocket system, disguised as a standard flatbed supply truck
- Missile tank
- Cannon-launched guided projectile
