= Spike (missile) =

Israeli anti-tank missile

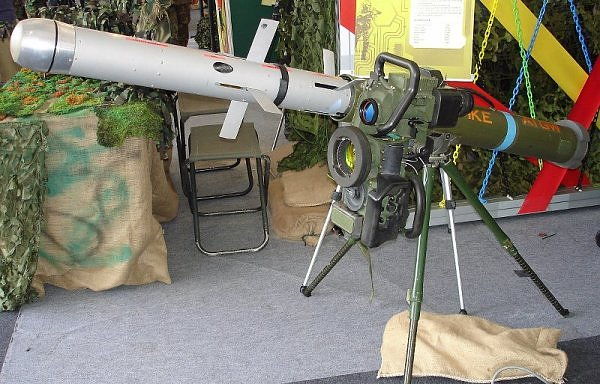
- Spike ATGM Command & launcher unit (CLU) with mock-up Spike LR missile mounted on a tripod at Singapore Army Open House 2007
- Type: Anti-tank guided missile
- Place of origin: Israel

Service history
- In service: 1981–present (Spike NLOS); 1997–present
- Used by: See Operators (41 countries ordered it)
- Wars: 1982 Lebanon War; Second Intifada; Iraq War; 2006 Lebanon War; Afghanistan War; 2008 Gaza War; 2014 Gaza War; 2016 Nagorno-Karabakh conflict; Second Nagorno-Karabakh War; 2023 Gaza War; Twelve-Day War; 2025 Cambodia-Thailand conflict

Production history
- Designer: Rafael Advanced Defense Systems
- Designed: Late 1970s (Spike NLOS)
- Manufacturer: Rafael Advanced Defense Systems & EUROSPIKE GmbH: Rafael Advanced Defense Systems; Diehl Defence; Rheinmetall Defence Electronics; ST Engineering (Singapore)
- Unit cost: $249,966 (US Army Spike NLOS, 2022), $140,000 (German Spike LR, 2017)
- Produced: Spike NLOS : Since early 1980s; Spike MR/LR/ER : Since 1997; Spike SR : Since 2012
- No. built: 40,000 (2023) (7,000 fired)
- Variants: See variants

Specifications
- Mass: Spike ER from Helicopter : Missile Round: 34 kg (75 lb); Launcher: 55 kg (121 lb); Launcher + 4 Missiles: 187 kg (412 lb); Spike MR/LR from Tripod : Missile Round: 14 kg (31 lb); Command & Launch Unit: 5 kg (11 lb); Tripod: 2.8 kg (6.2 lb); Battery: 1 kg (2.2 lb); Thermal Sight: 4 kg (8.8 lb); Spike SR : Missile Round: 9.6 kg (21 lb)
- Length: Spike MR/LR : 1,200 mm (3 ft 11 in); Spike ER : 1,670 mm (5 ft 6 in)
- Diameter: Spike MR/LR : 130 mm (5.1 in); Spike ER : 170 mm (6.7 in)
- Rate of fire: Ready to launch: 30 s Time to reload: 15 s
- Effective firing range: Spike SR : 50–1,500 m (55–1,640 yd); Spike MR : 200–2,500 m (220–2,730 yd); Spike LR : 200–4,000 m (220–4,370 yd); Spike LR 2 : 200–5,500 m (220–6,010 yd); Spike ER : 400–8,000 m (440–8,750 yd); Spike ER 2 : 400–10,000 m (440–10,940 yd); Spike NLOS : Land: 600–32,000 m (660–35,000 yd) Air: 600–50,000 m (660–54,680 yd)
- Sights: 10× Optical sight
- Warhead: HEAT Tandem-charge
- Detonation mechanism: Piezoelectric trigger
- Engine: Solid-propellant rocket
- Guidance system: Target Acquisition: Infrared seeker; CCD; Missile Guidance: IIR homing; CCD; CCD+IIR

Spike (Hebrew: ספייק) is an Israeli fire-and-forget anti-tank guided missile and anti-personnel missile with a tandem-charge high-explosive anti-tank (HEAT) warhead. As of 2024, it is in its sixth generation. It was developed and designed by the Israeli company Rafael Advanced Defense Systems. It is available in man-portable, vehicle-launched, helicopter-launched and maritime variants.

The missile can engage and destroy targets within the line-of-sight of the launcher ("fire-and-forget"), and some variants can make a top attack through a "fire, observe and update" method (essentially lock-on after launch); the operator tracking the target, or switching to another target, optically through the trailing fiber-optic wire (or RF link in the case of the vehicle-mounted, long-range NLOS variant) while the missile is climbing to altitude after launch. This is similar to the lofted trajectory flight profile of the US FGM-148 Javelin.

== Design ==
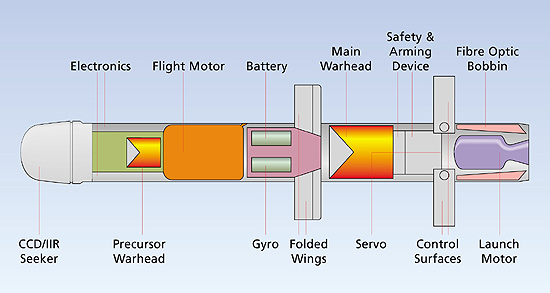
Cut away diagram of Spike ATGM.

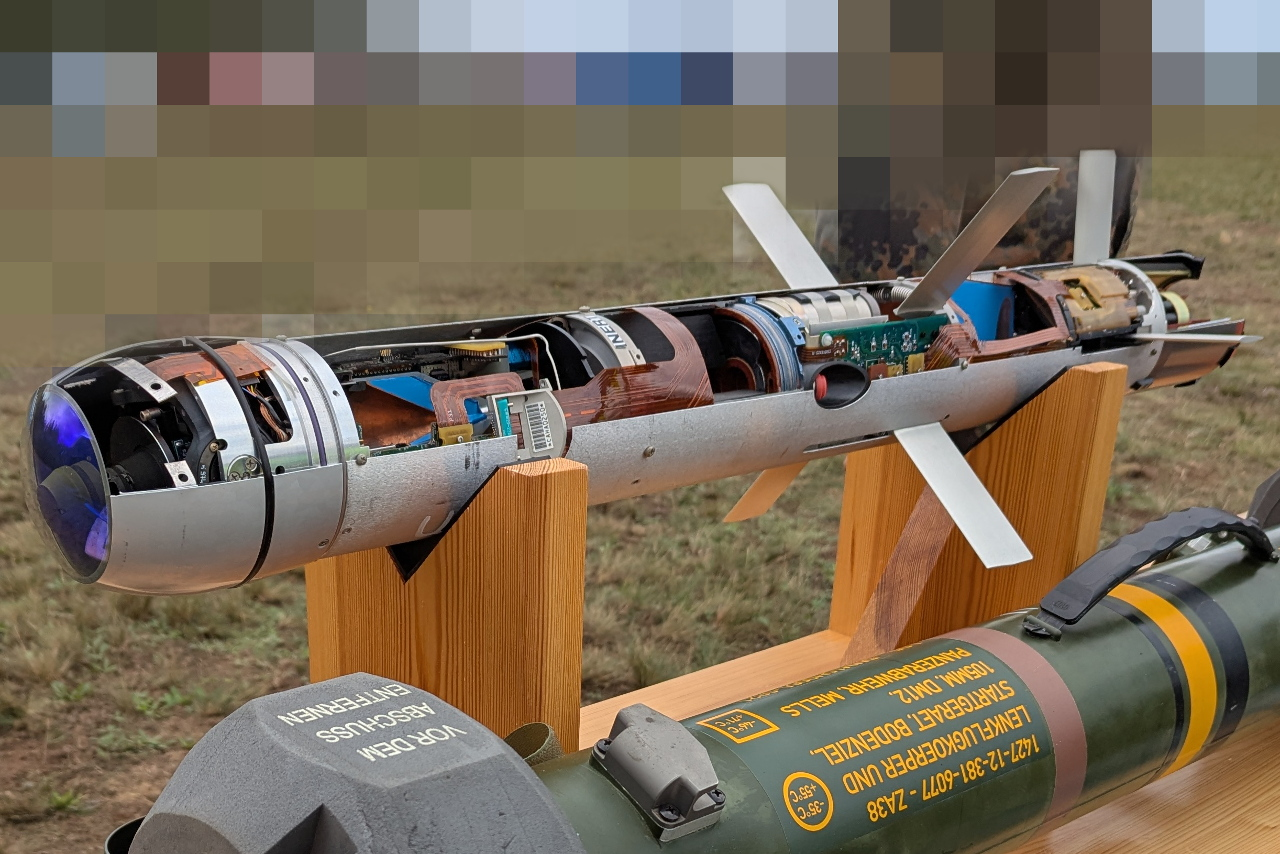
Cut away photo of Spike ATGM.

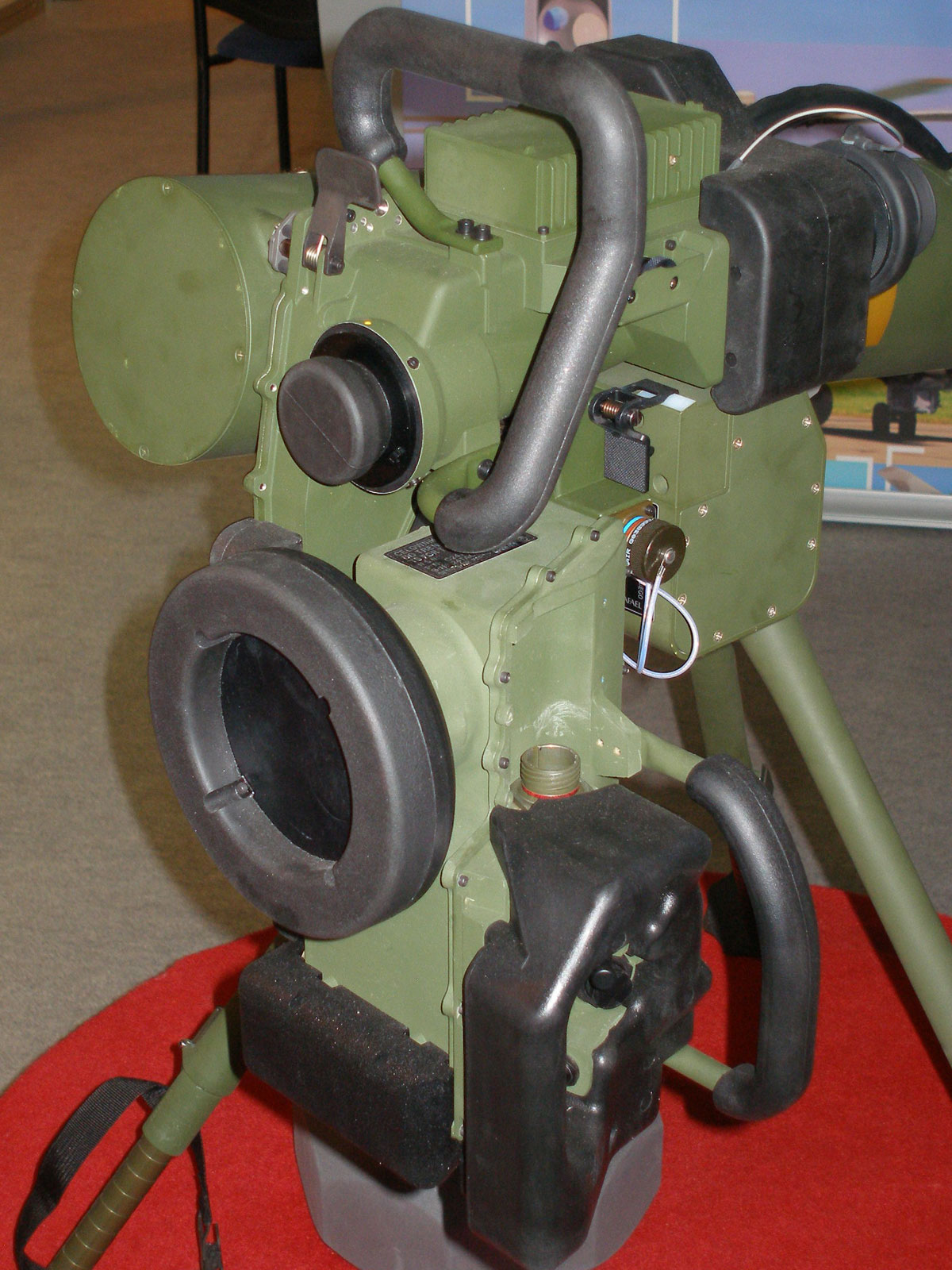
Frontal close-up of the Spike missile's Command & launch unit (CLU) with thermal-imaging sight, tripod mount and an attached dummy missile canister.

Spike is a fire-and-forget missile with lock-on before launch and automatic self-guidance. The missile is equipped with an imaging infrared seeker.

The long and extended range versions of the Spike also have the capability of "Fire, Observe and Update" operating mode (also known as Lock-on after launch (LOAL)). The missile is connected by a fiber-optical wire that is spooled out between the launch position and the missile. With this, the operator can obtain a target if it is not in the line of sight of the operator at launch, switch targets in flight, or compensate for the movement of the target if the missile is not tracking the target for some reason. Hence, the missile can be fired speculatively for a target of opportunity, or to provide observation on the other side of an obstacle. The missile has a soft launch capability – the motor firing after the missile has left the launcher – that allows the missile to be fired from confined spaces, which is a necessity in urban warfare.

The missile uses a tandem warhead consisting of two shaped charges: a precursor warhead to detonate any explosive reactive armor, and a primary warhead to penetrate the underlying armor. Currently, it is replacing aging semi-automatic command to line of sight second generation anti-tank missiles like the MILAN and M47 Dragon in the armies of the user nations. Spike missile is also equipped with heat chasing technology.

The Spike system is made up of the launching tripod with its fire control unit and the missile. There is no dedicated thermal sight on the launcher: the missile's imaging seeker is used. Altogether, the long range variant of the system weighs around 26 kg (57 lb).

Spike can be operated from the launcher by infantry, or from mounts that can be fitted to vehicles such as fast attack vehicles, armoured personnel carriers or utility vehicles. Vehicles that are not normally fitted with anti-tank weapons can therefore be given anti-tank capability.

Spike has been tested as a weapon system for the SAGEM Sperwer unmanned aerial vehicle. The Spanish Army has fitted the Spike ER to its Eurocopter Tiger attack helicopters. Both Israel and the United States have experimented with arming Sikorsky UH-60 Black Hawk helicopters with the Spike missile; the US variant is used in UH-60M Battlehawk helicopters.

== Marketing ==
In order to facilitate the selling of the weapon system in Europe, the company EuroSpike GmbH was formed in Germany. Its shareholders are Diehl Defence (40%), Rheinmetall Defence Electronics (40%) and Rafael via ERCAS B.V (20%). ERCAS B.V. is a Dutch holding company owned 100% by Rafael.

EuroSpike GmbH is located in Röthenbach, Germany. The European variant of the Spike weapon system differs a little from the Israeli version and is marketed under the name EuroSpike.

The missiles were also marketed and produced under license in Singapore by ST Engineering. For other areas of the world, Rafael Advanced Defense Systems Ltd. is solely responsible.

Rafael state over 40,000 missiles had been delivered to 41 countries by 2023, of which about 7,000 had been used in trials, training, and combat.

== Variants ==
=== Firing post ===
==== Command & Launch Unit (CLU) ====
The reusable Command & launch unit (CLU), battery, tripod and the thermal sight are common for both MR and LR versions of the Spike missile family, each weighing 5 kg (11 lb), 1 kg (2.2 lb), 2.8 kg (6.2 lb), and 4 kg (8.8 lb) respectively.

==== Integrated Control Launch Unit (ICLU) ====
They are used for the newer variants LR2 and ER2 variants.

==== Vehicle Missile Launching System (VMLS) ====
Launching system used on all turrets equipped with the Spike missile. The Spike LR, ER and NLOS as well as the modernised variants can be used with these systems.

=== Missiles ===
==== Spike SR ====
The short range version of the weapon was unveiled in 2012 to give infantrymen a guided missile between the larger Spike MR and unguided rockets. The missile is 8 kg (18 lb) for a 9.8 kg (22 lb) disposable munition for use at platoon-level whose minimum range is 50 m (160 ft) and whose maximum range is 1.5 km (0.93 mi). It is equipped with a stiff-necked uncooled electro-optical infrared seeker and advanced tracker, as opposed to the gimballed seeker in the Spike MR/LR/ER versions. The Spike SR does not require a separate sight, instead utilizing the low-cost thermal camera and guidance electronics strapped to the missile's nose to provide this function through a display integrated into the launcher, showing the target until launch. The warhead can either be a multi-purpose tandem shaped-charge warhead with blast-fragmentation effect or a new Penetration-Blast-Fragmentation (PBF) variant leveraged from the MATADOR's anti-structure warhead to equip maneuvering forces in urban environments to breach enemy cover and structures with a lethal blast effect. In May 2016 Rafael concluded deliveries of Spike SR to its first export customer, later revealed to be the Singapore Armed Forces to replace the Carl Gustaf M2.

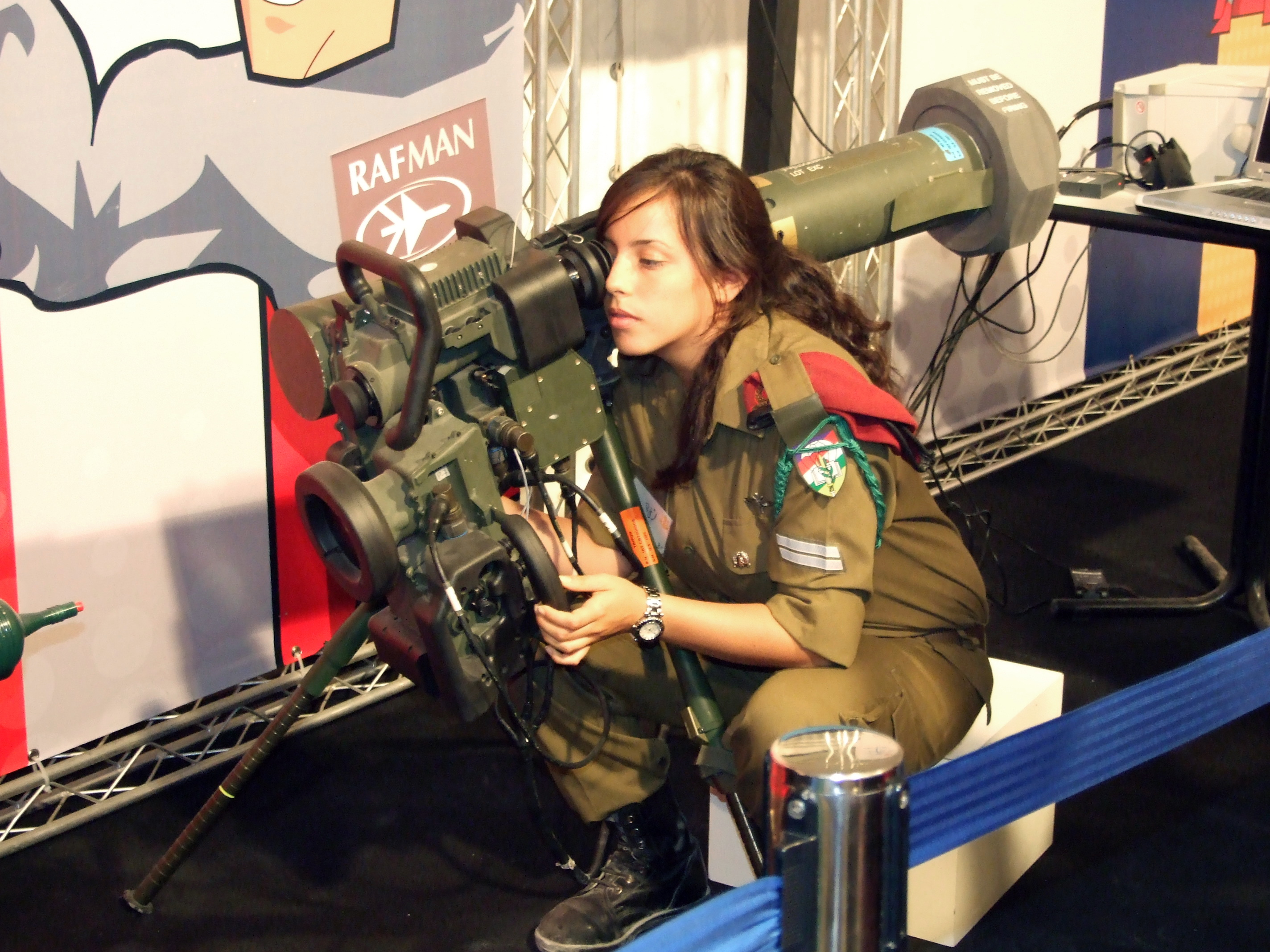
Israeli soldier with MR/LR type Spike launcher

==== Spike MR ====
The medium range version (Israeli designation: NT-Gil). The weight of the missile is 14 kg (31 lb), its minimum range is 200 m, while its maximum range is 2,500 m (1.6 mi). It is used by infantry and special forces.

==== Spike LR ====
Long range version (Israeli designation: NT-Spike). The weight of the missile is 14 kg (31 lb), and the weight of the complete system is less than 45 kg (99 lb). Maximum range is 4,000 m (2.5 mi) and it is used by infantry and light combat vehicles. It adds fiber-optic communication to and from the operator during flight. Reported armour penetration capability is more than 700 mm (28 in) of Rolled homogeneous armour (RHA). It is also deployed in Sentry Tech remotely controlled weapons stations along the Gaza border. In early 2014, Rafael revealed they had increased the range of the Spike LR to 5.5 km (3.4 mi), enhancing versatility on existing firing platforms and allowing it to be utilized on new ones like light helicopters.

==== Spike LR2 ====
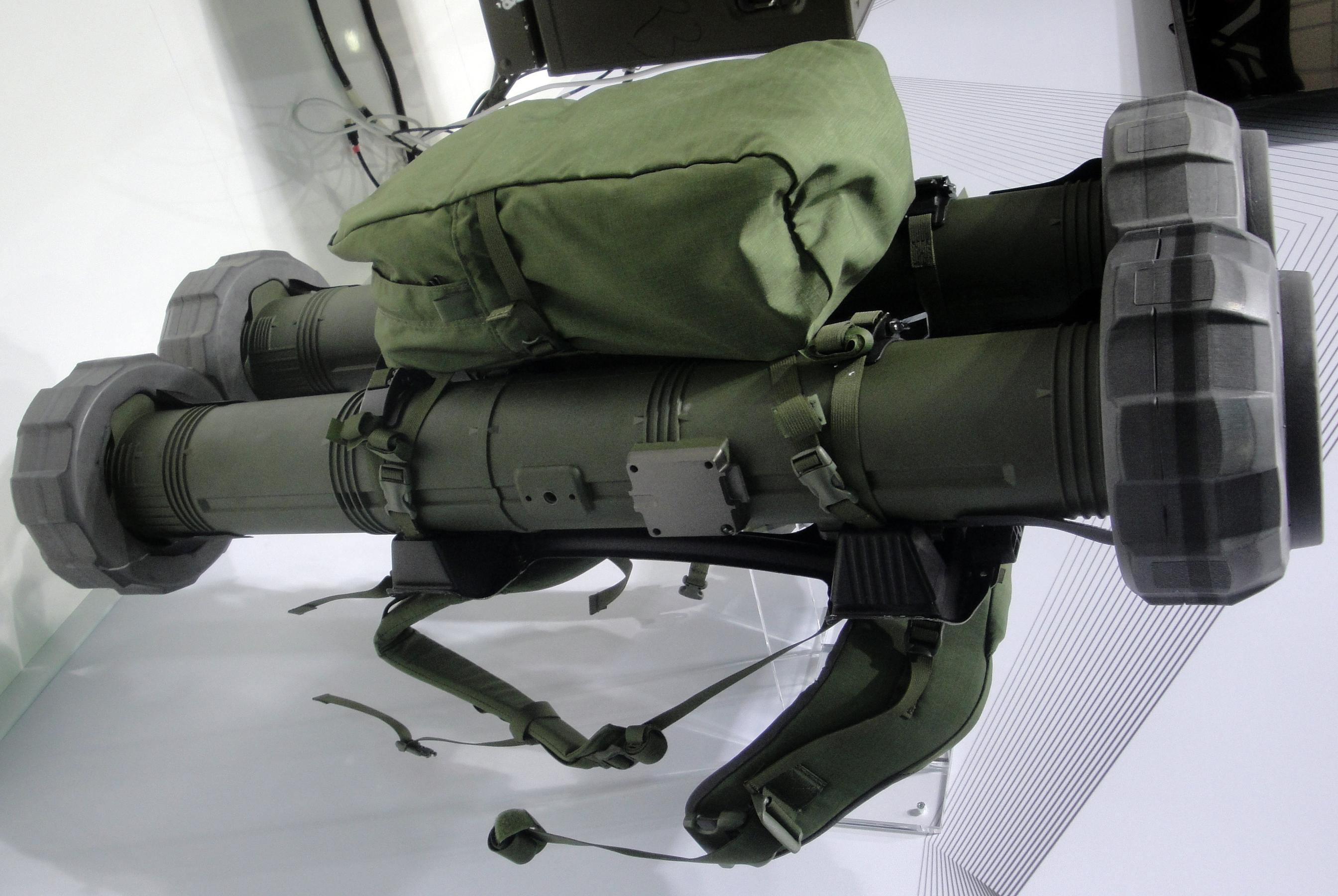
Spike LR2

A new generation of the original Spike LR is in full-scale development and scheduled to be operational by the end of 2018. Spike LR2 (Israeli designation: Gil-2, גיל 2) has a reduced missile weight to 13 kg (29 lb), and a reduced total system weight of 25 kg, increased range of 5.5 km (3.4 mi) at ground level and 10 km (6.2 mi) from helicopters using an RF data-link. Warhead options of tandem HEAT with 30% increased armor penetration or a multipurpose blast warhead with selectable impact or penetration detonation fusing, a new seeker that includes an uncooled IR sensor with a smart target tracker with artificial intelligence features, the ability to fire on grid target coordinates using an inertial measurement unit for third party-target allocation, and is compatible with legacy launchers. The missile is designed with a counter-active protection system (CAPS) capability, being able to hit targets at higher impact angles of up to 70 degrees. First ordered by the Israel Defense Forces (IDF) in October 2017.

==== Spike ER ====
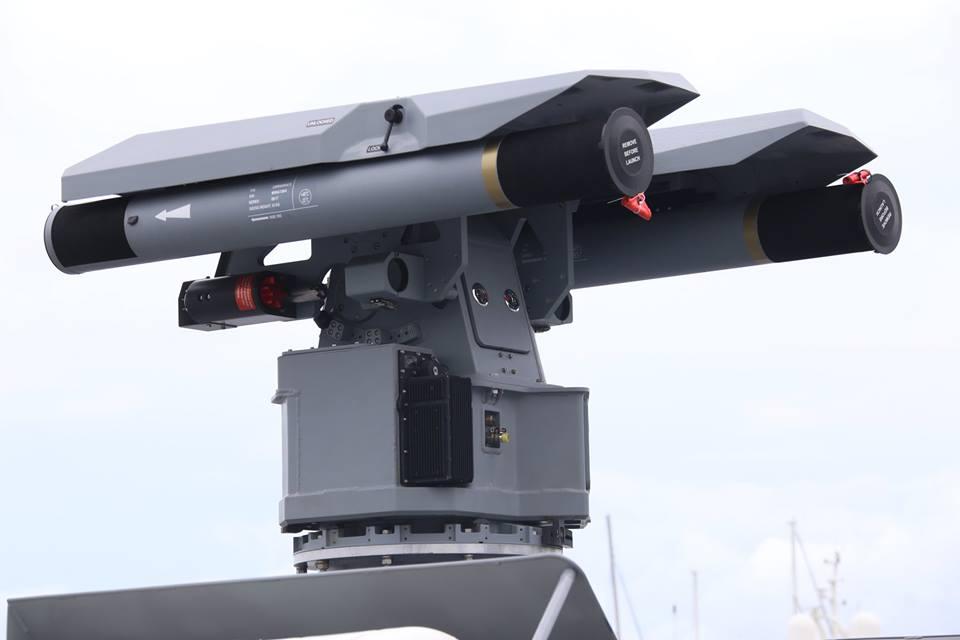
MPAC Mk. III attack boat (Philippine Navy) with a Rafael Typhoon MLS-ER weapon station armed with Spike ER missiles

Extended range or extra-long range version of the weapon (Israeli designation: NT-Dandy or NT-D). It has a minimum range of 400 m and a maximum range of 8,000 m (5.0 mi). It has a larger diameter and is heavier than the other systems, and is usually vehicle mounted. It is used by infantry, Light Combat Vehicle (LCVs), and helicopters. The Finnish Navy's Coastal Jaegers and Philippine Navy's Multi-purpose Attack Craft Mk.III also operate this version in the anti-ship role. The weight of the missile is 34 kg (74 lb 15 oz), the launchers are 30 kg (66 lb) and 55 kg (121 lb) respectively for the vehicle and air-launched versions. Penetration is around 1,000 mm (39 in) of RHA.

A maritime version of the Spike ER, with a stated range of up to 10 kilometres (5.4 nmi) and equipped with an electro-optical guidance system. The deck launcher can hold 4 missiles.

==== Spike ER2 ====
In August 2018, Rafael disclosed the development of an enhancement of the missile called the Spike ER2. It retains the same weight, airframe, surface geometries, and propulsion unit but introduces a two-way RF data-link to increase real-time control to an extended range of 16 km (9.9 mi) from helicopters; it also has an extended fiber optic link to increase range to 10 km (6.2 mi) from land and naval platforms.

==== Spike NLOS ====
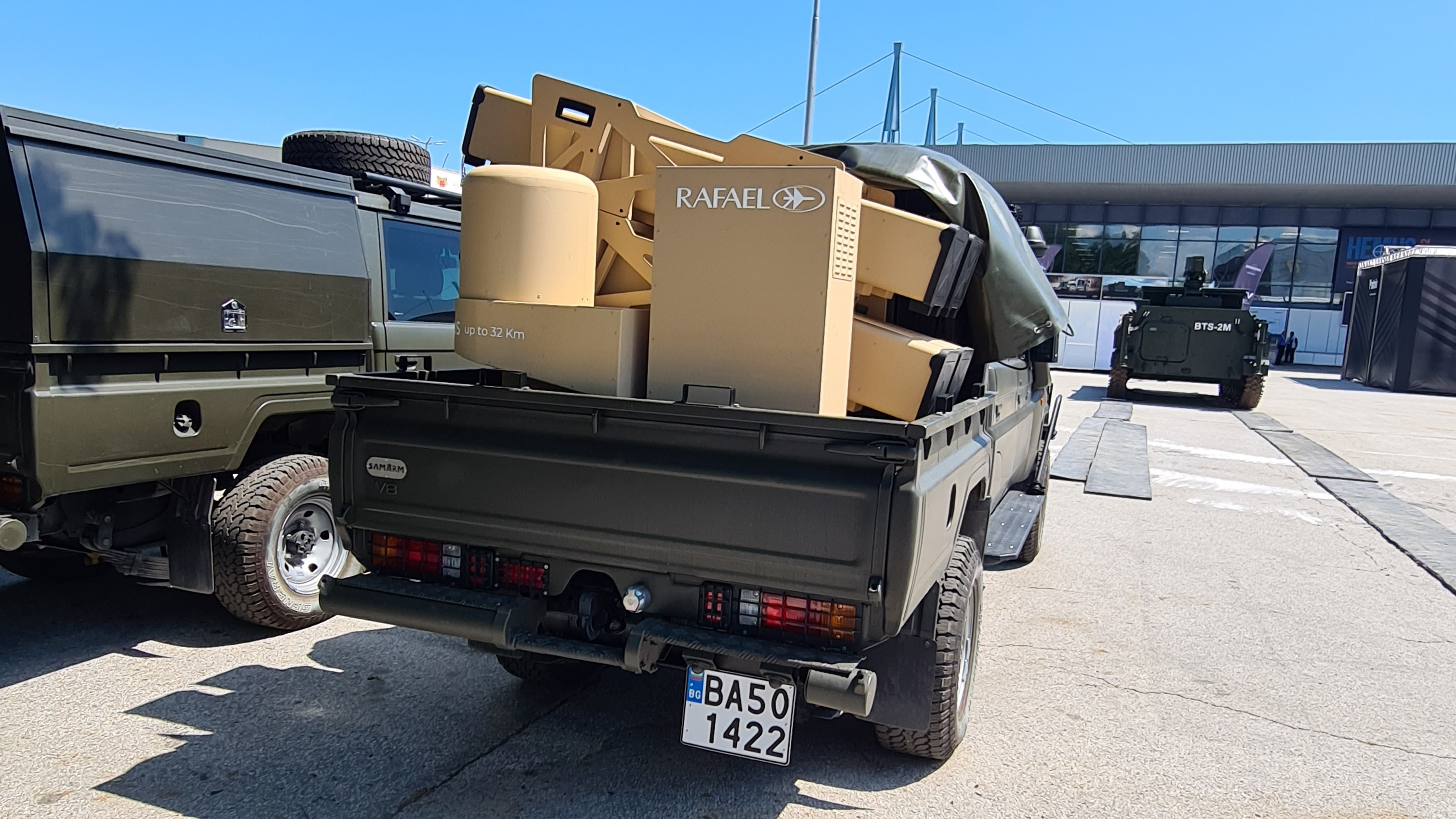
Toyota Land Cruiser 70 with Spike NLOS Mk5 launcher in the Bulgarian land forces

"Non Line Of Sight" is an ultra long-range version of the weapon (Israeli designation: Tamuz, תמוז), with a claimed maximum range of 32 km (20 mi). It is a significantly larger missile than other Spike variants, with an overall weight of around 70 kg (150 lb). It can be launched from the ground or from helicopters. It was developed following lessons learned in the Yom Kippur War, which showed a need for a high-precision guided tactical ground-to-ground battlefield missile. The first variants entered service with the Israel Defense Forces (IDF) in tandem with the Pereh missile carrier in 1981, though the existence of both was not revealed to the public until 2011. The Spike NLOS uses a fiber optic link similar to other Spike versions, but only out to 8 km, after which it employs a radio data link for command guidance.

In 2011 it also became known that in a highly unusual move, the British Army was hastily equipped with the missile for counter-mortar fire, drawn directly from IDF inventory after being exposed to increasing insurgent attacks in Iraq. Beginning in 2007 three variants of the NLOS were procured. A total of 600 missiles were acquired, the breakdown being 200 optical camera equipped NLOS Mk.2 in 2007, 200 thermal imaging equipped NLOS Mk.4 in 2008 for night operations (together with the NLOS Mk.2 these were known as EXACTOR-1), 200 dual camera equipped NLOS Mk.5 (EXACTOR-2) followed in 2009 which featured wings for slower but better maneuvering flight and a multi-purpose warhead replacing the anti-armor warhead of previous versions. For operational security, the codename of 'EXACTOR missile' was assigned in British service and it was initially mounted on launchers atop leased M113 APCs. The NLOS Mk.2 performed badly being too fast and difficult to control, the M113 overheated in the desert and had a poor resolution camera display that compared unfavorably with its contemporaries. So Britain financed the development of the NLOS Mk.5 known in British service as the EXACTOR 2 which replaced the M113 APC with a towed trailer known as SPARC holding four missiles in a 360-degree rotating turret that could be remotely controlled up to 500 m away ditching the non-standard M113 APCs altogether when in 2010 the batteries were transferred from Iraq to Afghanistan.

In a deal concluded on 6 September 2011, the South Korean government had agreed to purchase an unknown number of Spike NLOS Mk.5 missiles.

Rafael is working on expanding the missile's versatility by enhancing the existing EO-IR/CCD seeker with semi-active laser (SAL) capability and different anti-armor, blast-penetration, and high-explosive fragmentation warheads to meet specific applications.

AH-64E launching a Spike NLOS missile

In 2020 the US Army announced its intention to procure Spike NLOS missiles to be mounted on Apache helicopters. A test was conducted in March 2021 where an AH-64E fired a Spike NLOS at a target 32 km (20 mi) away and scored a direct hit.

In June 2022, Rafael unveiled the Spike NLOS 6th generation with range increased to 50 kilometres (31 mi), a salvo feature which can launch up to four missiles at a time, and the ability to hand over control after firing to another platform. It also has a Target Image Acquisition capability that can prioritize important targets for strike, and can be carried by strategic UAVs in the Heron-TP-class.

The Israeli Navy uses a maritime version of the Spike NLOS, with a stated range of up to 32 kilometres (17 nmi) and equipped with a dual passive electro-optical guidance system and an infrared imaging camera with image processing capabilities. The deck launcher is available for 8 or 4 missiles.

==== Mini Spike ====
On 2 September 2009, at an IDF exhibition held at the third Latrun annual land warfare conference, the Israeli Defense Force unveiled the Mini Spike Anti-personnel guided weapon (APGW). Rafael claimed that this missile costs and weighed only a third of the Spike LR at 4 kg (8.8 lb), while offering a longer engagement range of 1.3–1.5 km (0.81–0.93 mi) when compared to the Spike SR. It was to introduce new flight modes to enable precision strikes in urban areas, such as flying through windows or attacking an enemy hidden behind defilade or obstacles using non-line-of-sight engagement. Mini Spike would use the same launcher and sight system of the Spike LR, loading the missile on a special adaptor. By 2016, Mini Spike development had been discontinued.

==== Aerospike ====
In May 2022, Rafael unveiled the Aerospike, a version of the Spike LR2 designed to be launched from fixed-wing aircraft. Weighing 14 kg and utilizing the same airframe, EO/IR seekers and warheads as the Spike LR2, it features longer wings to give it an improved glide ratio for a range of 30 km (19 mi) when launched from 8,200 metres (27,000 ft). The munition does not require GPS to navigate, incorporating scene-matching technology and detection and tracking capabilities. A real-time RF data-link allows for man-in-the-loop operation enabling mid-flight target handover, re-targeting and abort options while also controlling approach angle, azimuth and flight trajectory, achieving accuracy within 3 meters of the target with a HEAT or blast fragmentation warhead. By the time of public announcement, the Aerospike was already in service with unnamed users.

=== Missile copies ===
==== Almas ====
Iran received some Israeli Spike MR that were captured during the 2006 Lebanon War by Hezbollah. These were reverse-engineered into an unlicensed variant of the Spike family that goes by the name of Almas (Persian: الماس). The ATGM was unveiled in public on 7 July 2021. It was shown overseas at the MILEX 2023 exhibition held in May in Belarus and at the Partner 2023 exhibition held in September in Serbia.

On 25 January 2024, a video was released that appeared to show Hezbollah forces using the system against an Israeli surveillance outpost at Shlomi. On 27 January 2024, another attack involving the Almas was reported at Rosh HaNikra.

== Integration to vehicles and systems ==
=== Australia ===
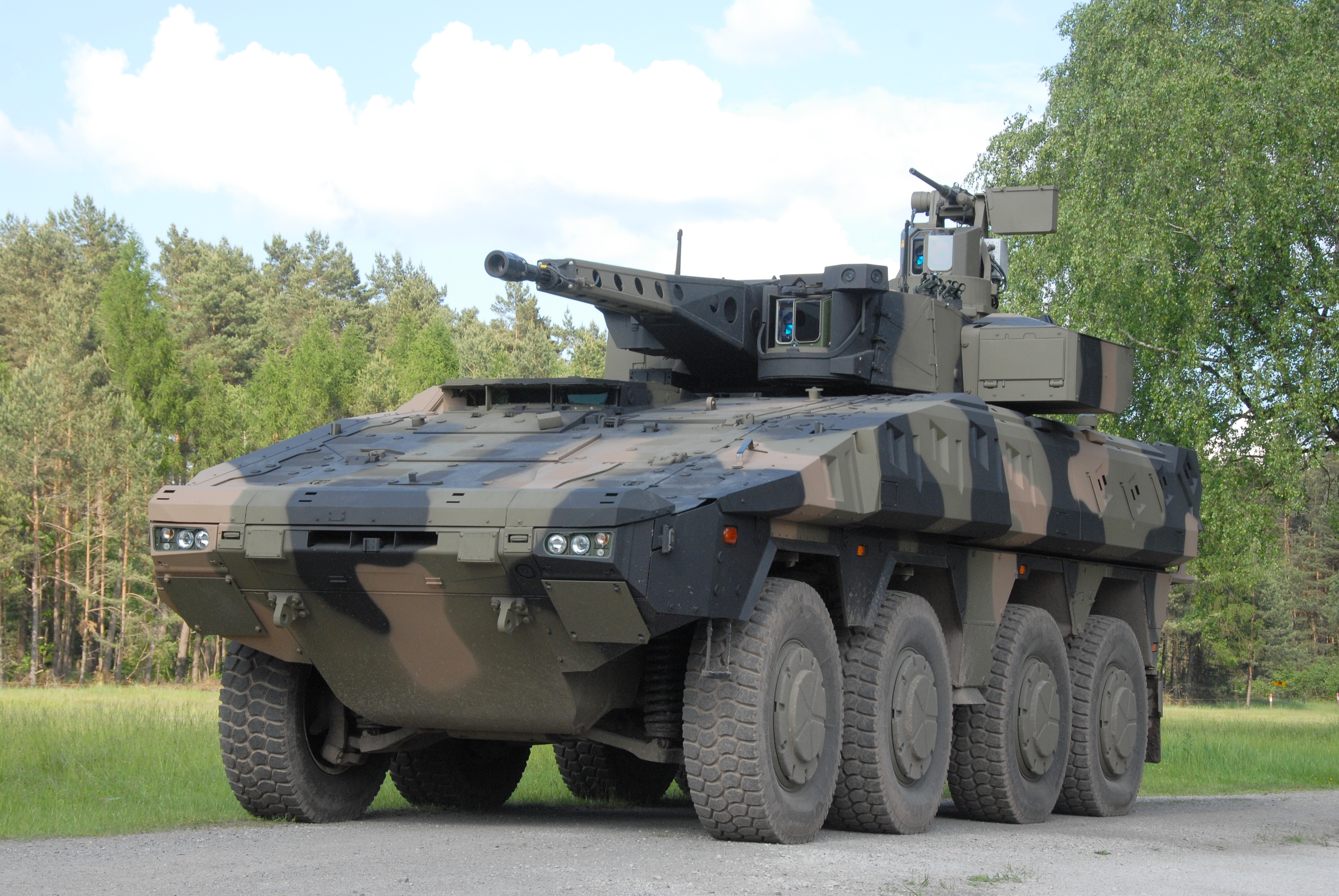
Boxer CRV

==== Vehicle integration ====
Boxer CRV:

- Order of the Spike LR2 for 133 CRV in 2023. The combat reconnaissance vehicle is equipped with a Rheinmetall Lance turret, which integrates a launcher with 2 MELLS missiles.

K21 Redback

- 129 IFV ordered and to be equipped with a double Spike LR2 launcher on its turret.

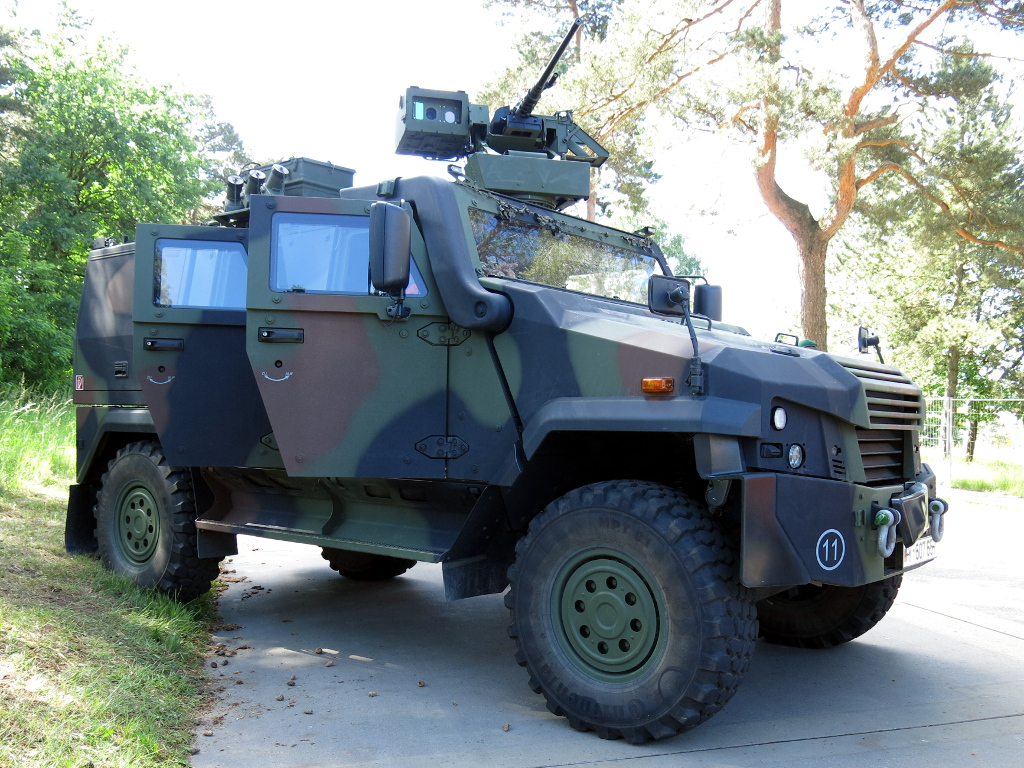
Mowag Eagle V

=== Cyprus ===
LAPV Enok:

- 60 LAPV Enok vehicles purchased to be fitted with a single Spike LR2 launcher.

=== Denmark ===
==== Vehicle integration ====
Eagle V

- Number purchased has not been disclosed mounted in Kongsberg Protector RWS

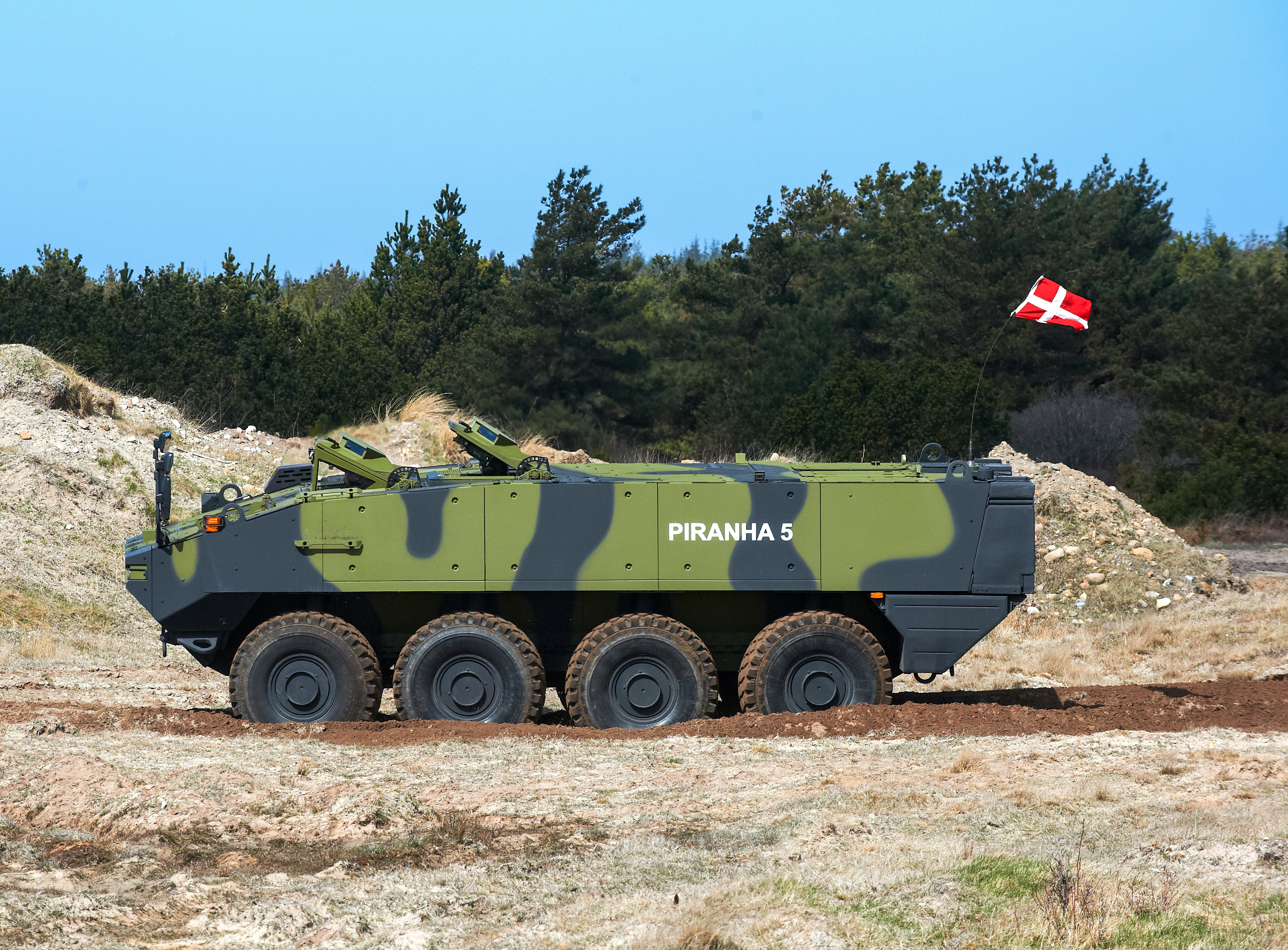
Piranha V

==== Future vehicle integration ====
Piranha V

- Number purchased has not been disclosed mounted in Kongsberg Protector RWS ready for 2025

CV90

- 115 CV90MKIIICs with D-Series turrets and integrated spikes have been ordered with an estimated delivery of 2026-2029 an additional 44 were purcheased to replace the 44 aging CV90MKIIIAs instead of renewing them

=== Germany ===
==== System integration ====
- March 2017, contract to integrate the Spike LR (MELLS) to the AGDUS system (Bundeswehr's laser based training and simulation system) for €20.3 million.

==== Vehicle integration ====
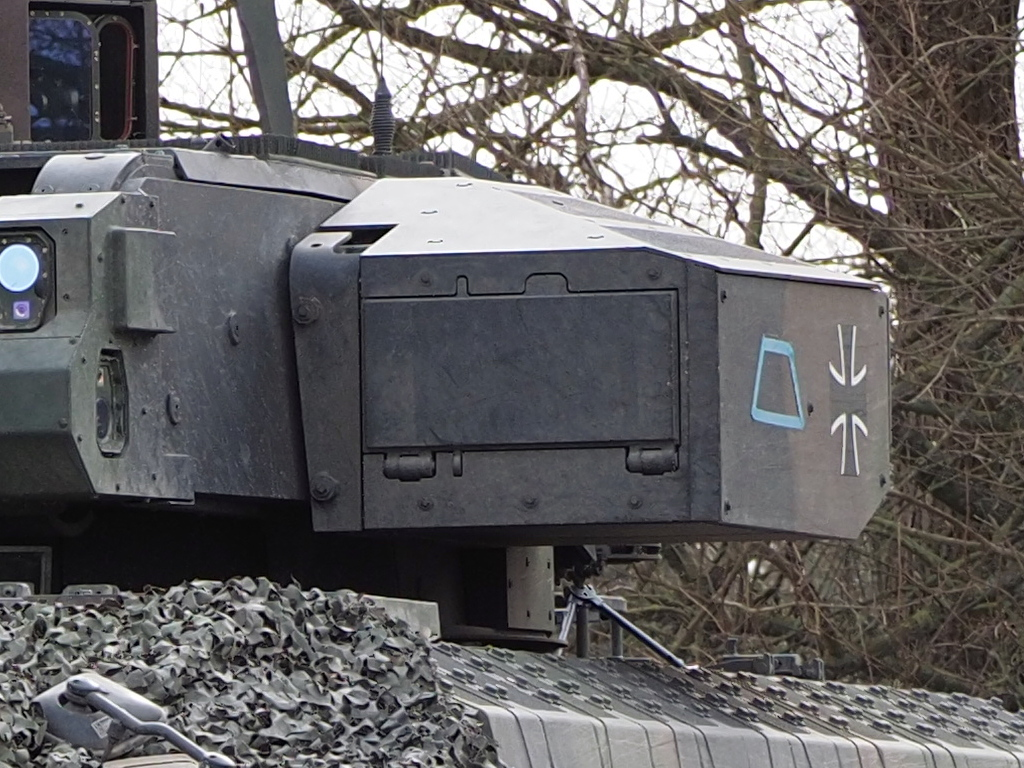
MELLS launcher on Puma

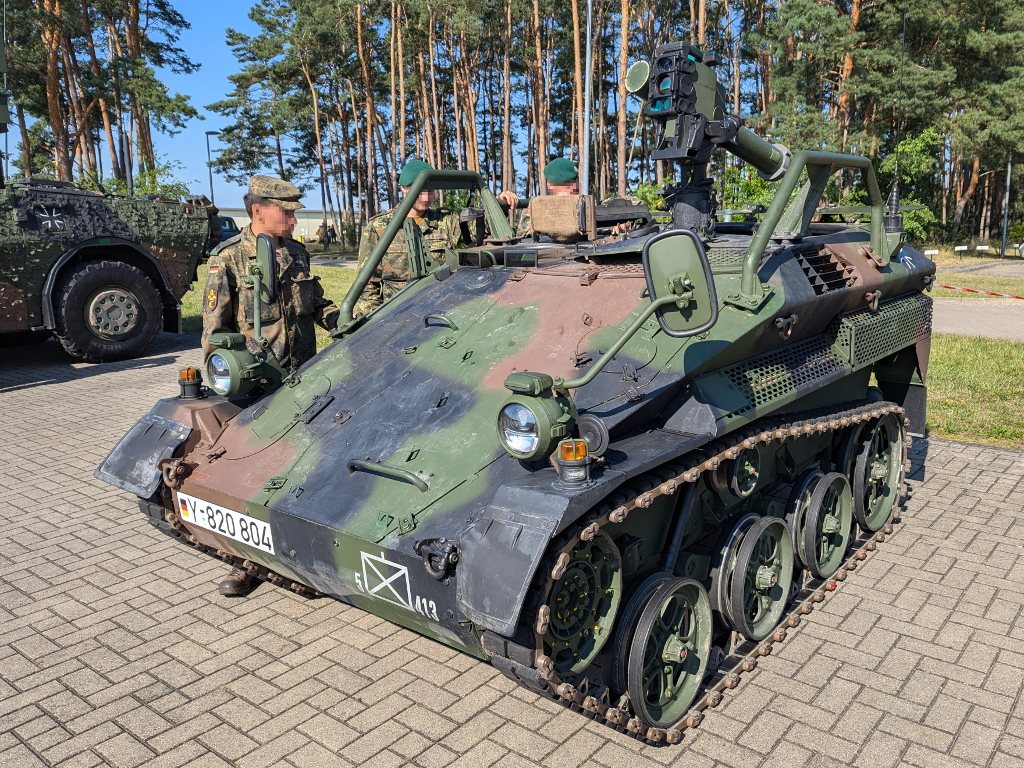
Wiesel 1 AWC - MELLS

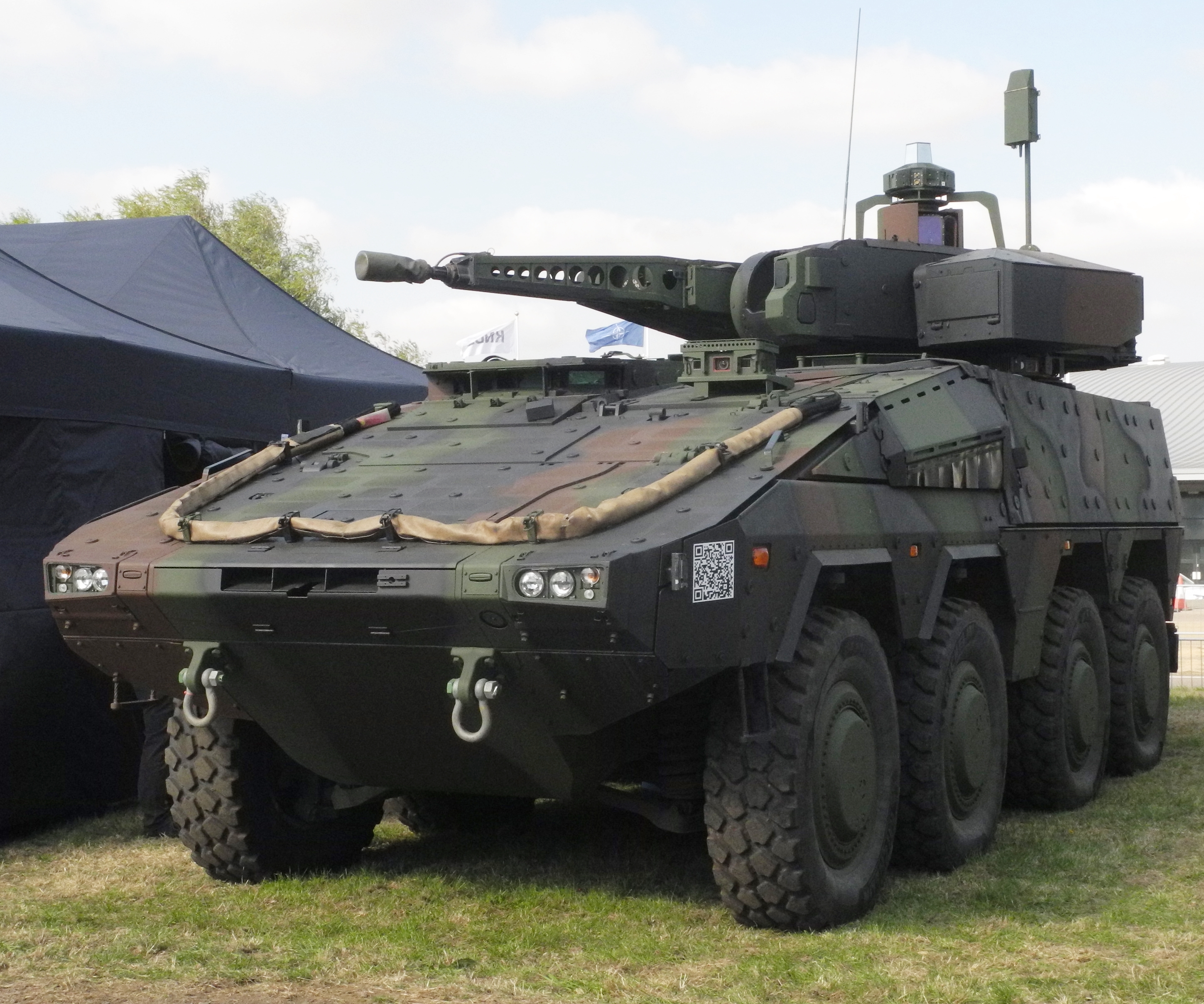
Boxer IFV with KNDS RCT-30 turret

Spz Puma

- December 2008, contract to integrate and prototype the double MELLS launcher on two Puma for €18 million.
- February 2009, contract to develop the double launcher on the turret of the Puma further for €68 million.
- Contracts to bring the Puma to the S1 standard, among which integrates the MELLS double launcher to the fleet:
  - 2018, upgrade of 40 Puma.
  - June 2021, upgrade of 154 Puma.
  - April 2023, upgrade of 143 Puma.

Marder 1A5

- 2017, integration of MELLS mounts to replace the MILAN missile.

Wiesel 1 AWC - MELLS (weapon carrier), entered service in 2022:

- Upgrade of 60 Wiesel 1 TOW that were equipped with the BGM-71 TOW missile to a new standard which integrates the MELLS missile on a mount.

==== Aircraft integration ====
- Airbus H-Force equipped with the Spike ER2, can be adapted to the H125M, H145M, H225M.

==== Future vehicle integration ====
GTK Boxer

- March 2024, contract for 123 Boxer CRV equipped with a Rheinmetall Lance turret, which integrates a launcher with 2 MELLS missiles.
- Plan to order 148 wheeled IFV equipped with the KNDS RCT-30 turret (same as the Spz Puma), two potential MELLS launchers were presented to the Bundeswehr.

=== Italy ===
==== Potential vehicle integration ====
Freccia:

- Freccia EVO Combat, to be equipped with a remote Hitfist OWS turret with 30 mm autocannon and a Spike LR2 missile.
- 120 Freccia EVO Reconnaissance, to be equipped with a remote Hitfist OWS turret with 30 mm autocannon and a Spike LR2 missile launcher, plus a Janus sensor mast.

=== Israel ===
==== Future UAV integration ====
- Golden Eagle HS (Heavy Strike), a 50 kg rotary UAS (unmanned aerial system) by Steadicopter that can be equipped with the Spike SR and the Spike LR2.

=== Netherlands ===
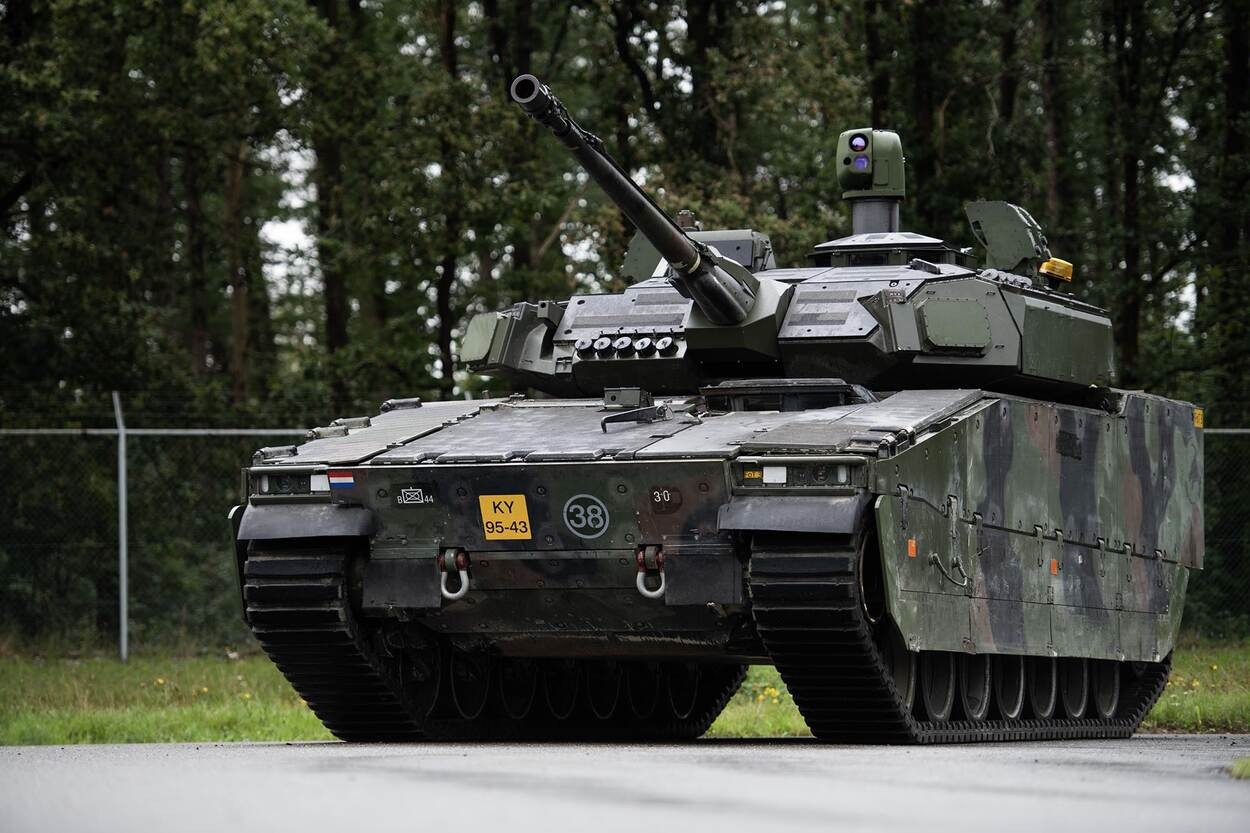
CV90 MK III MLU

==== Vehicle integration ====
CV9035NL:

- Integrated in the CV90 MK IIIs D-Series turret, delivered with the MLU (midlife upgrade) program.

=== Poland ===
==== Vehicle integration ====
Infantry fighting vehicles on order, to be equipped with a launch container for 2 Spike LR missiles on the right of the ZSSW-30 turret:

- 128 KTO Rosomak
  - 70 ordered in 2022
  - 58 ordered in July 2024
- 174 KTO Rosomak-L ordered in July 2024
- BWP Borsuk (257 ordered from 1014 planned)

==== Potential vehicle integration ====
Infantry fighting vehicles planned to be equipped with a launch container for 2 Spike LR missiles on the right of the ZSSW-30 turret:

- Heavy IFV, up to 700 planned, in development .

=== Spain ===
==== Vehicle integration ====
Piranha V (Dragon VCR):

- 40 of the 219 in the VCR variant (an armoured fighting vehicle) will be equipped with a Guardian 30 turret (by Escribano) that has a retractable launcher for 2 Spike LR2 missiles.

==== Aircraft integration ====
- EC-665 Tiger HAD/HAP

==== Potential vehicle integration ====
Piranha V (Dragon VCR) from the first order:

- 58 Dragon VEC (reconnaissance)
- 14 Dragon VCR-PC (company command post)

== Operational use ==
=== 2020 Second Nagorno-Karabakh War ===
Azerbaijan used Spike missiles on Armenian T-72 tanks during Second Nagorno-Karabakh War.

=== 2023 Israeli invasion of the Gaza Strip ===
During the 2023 Israeli invasion of the Gaza Strip, the Israeli Navy attacked Hamas targets on the Gaza Strip coastline using Spike NLOS missiles.

Reports state that the IDF used Spike missiles fired by a Hermes 450 drone to target an armed militant travelling in a World Central Kitchen convoy in Gaza; the militant had already left the vehicle and the resulting strike killed seven WCK aid workers.

=== June 2025 Israeli strikes on Iran ===
As part of Israel's Operation Rising Lion, Mossad agents used remotely controlled Spike Non-Line-Of-Sight (NLOS) missiles to strike Iranian targets on the ground, such as aircraft or missile launchers. The launchers were later recovered by Iranian officials.

In August 2025, the United States Army and Polish forces conducted the first European firing of the Spike NLOS missile, launching two Israeli-made Rafael Advanced Defense Systems munitions from AH-64E Apache helicopters at floating targets 16 miles offshore. The demonstration was held at the Polish Air Force Training Center in Ustka.

== Operators ==
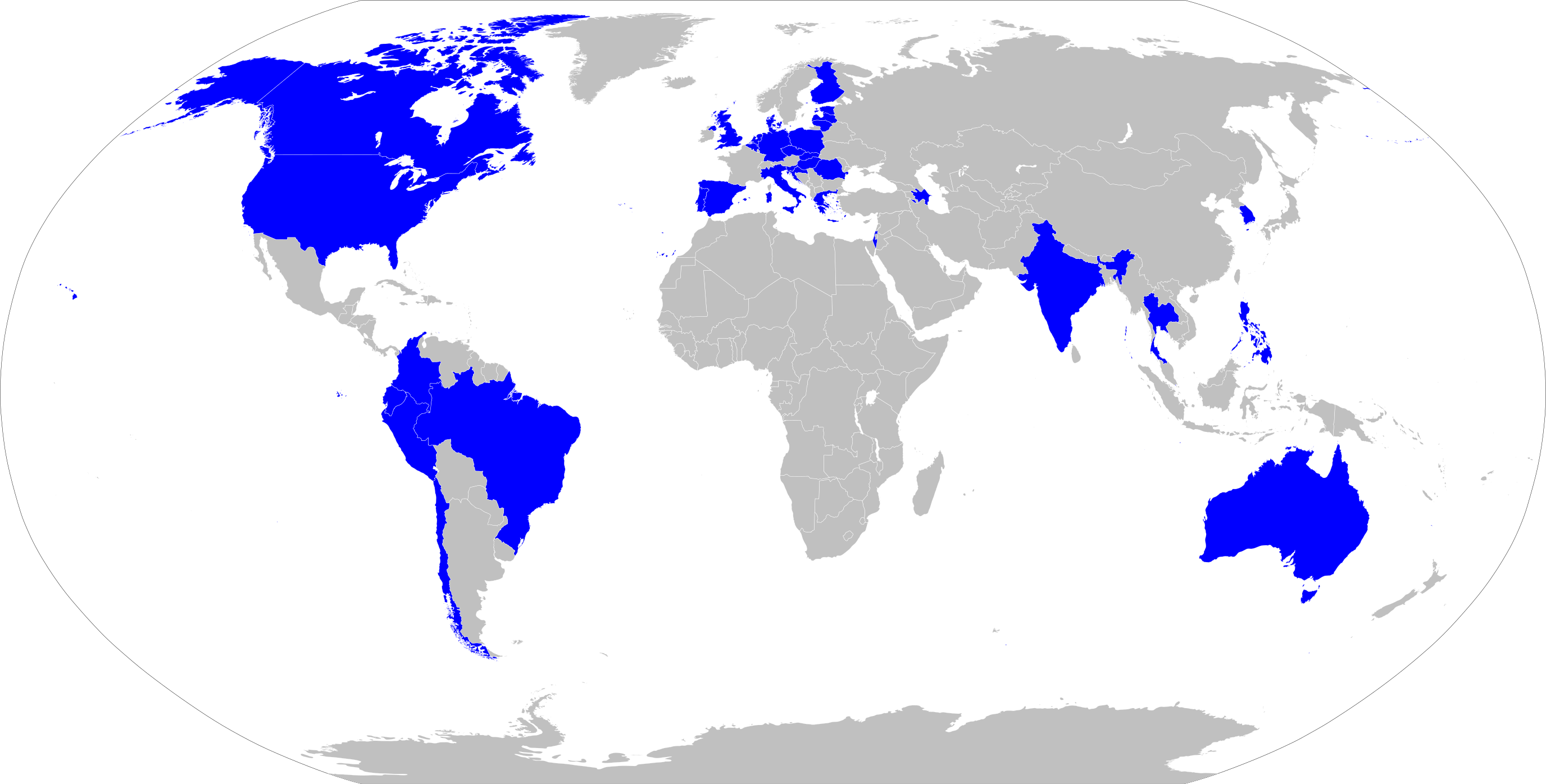
Map with Spike operators in blue

=== Current and future operators ===
Australia
Spike LR2 selected by the Australian Army in 2018
- LAND 159, for dismounted infantry
- LAND 400-2, equipping the 211 Boxer CRV with LANCE turret
- LAND 400-3, equipping the 129 K21 Redback. Australia is also considering plans to domestically manufacture Spike missiles.
Azerbaijan
Total 350 Spike LR and 250 Spike NLOS missiles, some of which are mounted on the Plasan Sand Cat, and Mil Mi-17.
Belgium
240 Spike MR and Spike LR missiles ordered in 2013, delivery completed in 2015.
Bulgaria
Unspecified number of Spike NLOS Mk.5 launchers procured. Seen in public for the first time at HEMUS 2022.
Brazil
100 Spike LR2 missiles ordered in November 2021 with 10 launchers and 10 simulators, delivered in 2024.
Canada
Spike LR missiles since 2016 as part of CANSOFCOM. In December 2023, Canada announced the purchase of Spike LR2 missiles to equip the Canadian Brigade in Latvia. In December 2024, the DND confirmed that the majority of the first batch of missiles received did not function properly during testing.
Chile
Total 3,500 Spike MR, Spike LR and Spike ER missiles, for use on modernized Marder IFVs.
Colombia
Total of 85 Spike LR and ER, and 110 Spike NLOS missiles which arm the Colombian Air Force's fleet of Sikorsky AH-60L Arpía IV helicopters.
Croatia
The Croatian Army purchased launchers capable of launching the Spike LR for 9 Patria AMV IFV, later on, an additional order for 7 IFV was made. The missiles were ordered separately.
Note: the dismounted infantry troops use the Javelin.
Cyprus
Several Spike LR2 launchers to be fitted onto 60 ENOK AB's.
Czech Republic
Total of 500 Spike LR missiles, for use on Pandur II IFVs.
Denmark
The Spike LR 2 has been integrated in the Royal Danish Army since 2021 and deliveries are planned until 2025. Used on Eagle V while planned for Piranaha V and CV90
Estonia
18 iCLU launchers bought from EuroSpike GmbH for the Spike LR2, and more than 500 Spike SR systems purchased in 2022.
Finland
Missiles ordered:
- 300 Spike MR
- 200 Spike LR
- 400 Spike ER
- Additional Spike SR, LR2, ER2 ordered in December 2022 for a value of €223.6 million.
Launchers ordered:
- 100 CLU (Panssarintorjuntaohjusjärjestelmä 2000) launchers plus an option for 70 more
- 18 ER (Rannikko-ohjus 2006) launchers for coastal anti-ship use.
Germany
Purchased by the German Army to replace the BGM-71 TOW and MILAN missiles. As of October 2024, 525 iCLU launcher units (integrated Control Launch Unit) were ordered and 4,326 MELLS missiles (Spike LR), and an unknown number of Spike LR2 missiles.
Detailed orders of the German Army:
- June 2009, 311 iCLU launcher units for the MELLS missile ordered for €35 million and there is an option for 1,160 missiles as part of the contract.
- December 2011, 1,160 MELLS missiles ordered as per the option of the 2009 contract (€119.3 million).
- March 2017, 1,000 MELLS missiles (€112.4 million) and 97 iCLU launcher units (€25.6 million) ordered.
- November 2019, framework agreement for up to 11,500 MELLS missiles and 214 iCLU launcher units: Firm orders within this framework agreement:
  - November 2019, 1,500 MELLS missiles and 132 iCLU launcher units ordered.
  - March 2021, 666 MELLS missiles and 82 iCLU launcher units ordered for €88 million.
  - September 2024, unknown number of MELLS LR2 (Spike LR2) missiles for €700 million.
Greece
In April 2023, Greece ordered 17 Spike NLOS systems on 4×4 vehicles, plus more on 9 AH-64 Apache helicopters and 4 Machitis-class gunboats. Deliveries started in August 2025.
Hungary
The Spike LR2 will equip the IFV variant of the KF-41 Lynx, equipped with the Rheinmetall LANCE turret.
India
Orders:
- In October 2014, India selected the Spike missile over the Javelin missile. The deal was planned for around USD $1 billion, including 321 CLU missiles, 8,356 missiles, 15 simulators and peripheral equipment. It was planned that Bharat Dynamics Limited would be the systems integrator for the missiles with major work share for manufacture to be handled by Bharat Dynamics and Kalyani Group. On 20 November 2017, it was announced that the deal was cancelled due to lack of transfer of technology. The DRDO has been instructed to produce an indigenous missile. However, Indian media sources have reported that the contract will proceed as part of a restructured government to government agreement.
- 12 launchers and 240 Spike MR missiles ordered urgently by the Indian Army in April 2019, following the 2019 border skirmishes with Pakistan. The first missiles entered service in early October 2019.
- In 2023, India announced that it would integrate the Spike NLOS to the Mil Mi-17 V5 attack helicopter. Integration was underway as of 29 April 2026.
Israel
The Spike NLOS (Tammuz) was introduced into service in the early 1980s.
In 1997, the Spike MR (Gil), LR (Gomed), ER (Perakh Bar) with associated launchers entered service.

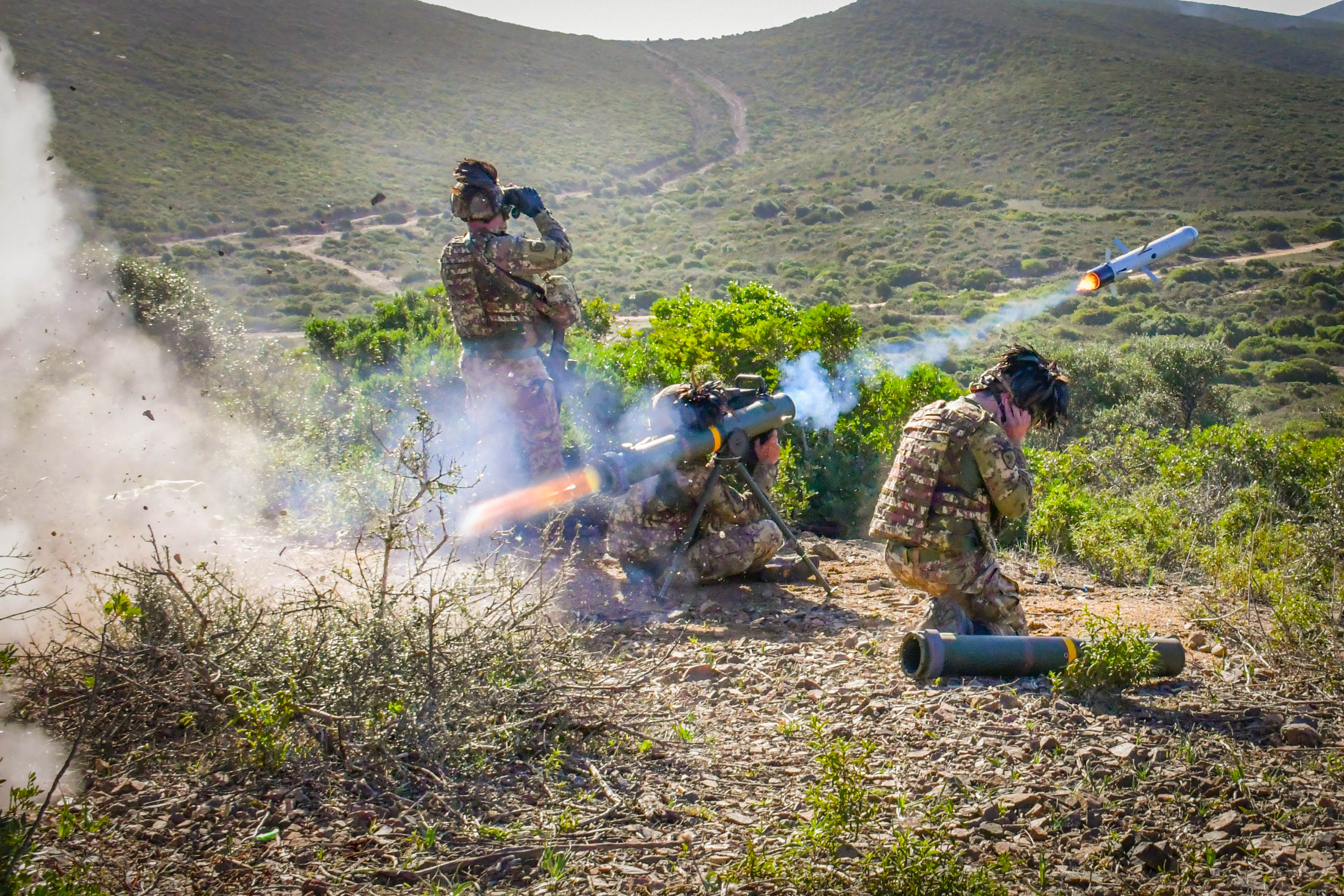
Italian Army 8th Bersaglieri Regiment Spike launch during an exercise

Italy
Orders:
- 2004 - equipment for the infantry:
  - 53 CLU launchers ordered
    - 21 installed on the VLTM Lince
    - 32 for the infantry troops
  - 510 missiles:
    - 165 Spike MR
    - 345 Spike LR
- 2009 - order for the 36 VBM Freccia controcarro:
  - 84 iCLU launchers
  - 870 Spike LR
  - 63 simulators
- Spike ER missile selected for the Agusta A129D Mangusta in 2010, operational since 2014.
  - 32 launcher systems TOPLITE III + 16 in option
  - 800 Spike ER were ordered
- 2020 framework agreement, in a mutual agreement with Israel who would buy AW-119KX helicopters. Order:
  - Missiles
    - 600 Spike LR2 with anti-tank warhead
    - 200 Spike LR2 with multi-purpose warhead
  - Launchers:
    - 126 iCLU launchers
  - Simulators
    - 14 indoor simulators
    - 14 outdoor simulators
    - 20 mechanical trainer iCLU
    - 20 mechanical trainer round LR2
Kurdistan
Operated by the Peshmerga, might have been funded by Italy or Germany, or could have been directly from Israel.
Latvia
12 Spike LR received. Additional order in February 2018.: In June 2025, Latvia signed a contract with EuroSpike for €81 million. The delivery is planned for 2028. The contract is likely for Spike LR2.
Lithuania
Total 1,000 Spike LR missiles delivered, for use on Boxer armored vehicles.
Netherlands
- Spike MR "GILL", selected in June 2001, ordered in August 2001, first delivery in 2004:
  - 297 CLU launchers
  - 2,400 Spike MR missiles
- 85 Spike LR received in 2017 and 2018, for the reconnaissance forces (transported by the Luchtmobiel Speciaal Voertuig and the Fennek reconnaissance vehicle), using the existing launchers.
- Spike LR2 and iCLU launchers approved by the parliament in September 2024, to be ordered in October 2024 and enter service in 2026. They were ordered as a successor to the Spike MR and to equip the modernised CV9035NL MLU with its new D-series turret. The number of missiles and launchers to be ordered is unknown
Peru
Total 516 Spike LR and 175 Spike ER missiles with 48 launchers.

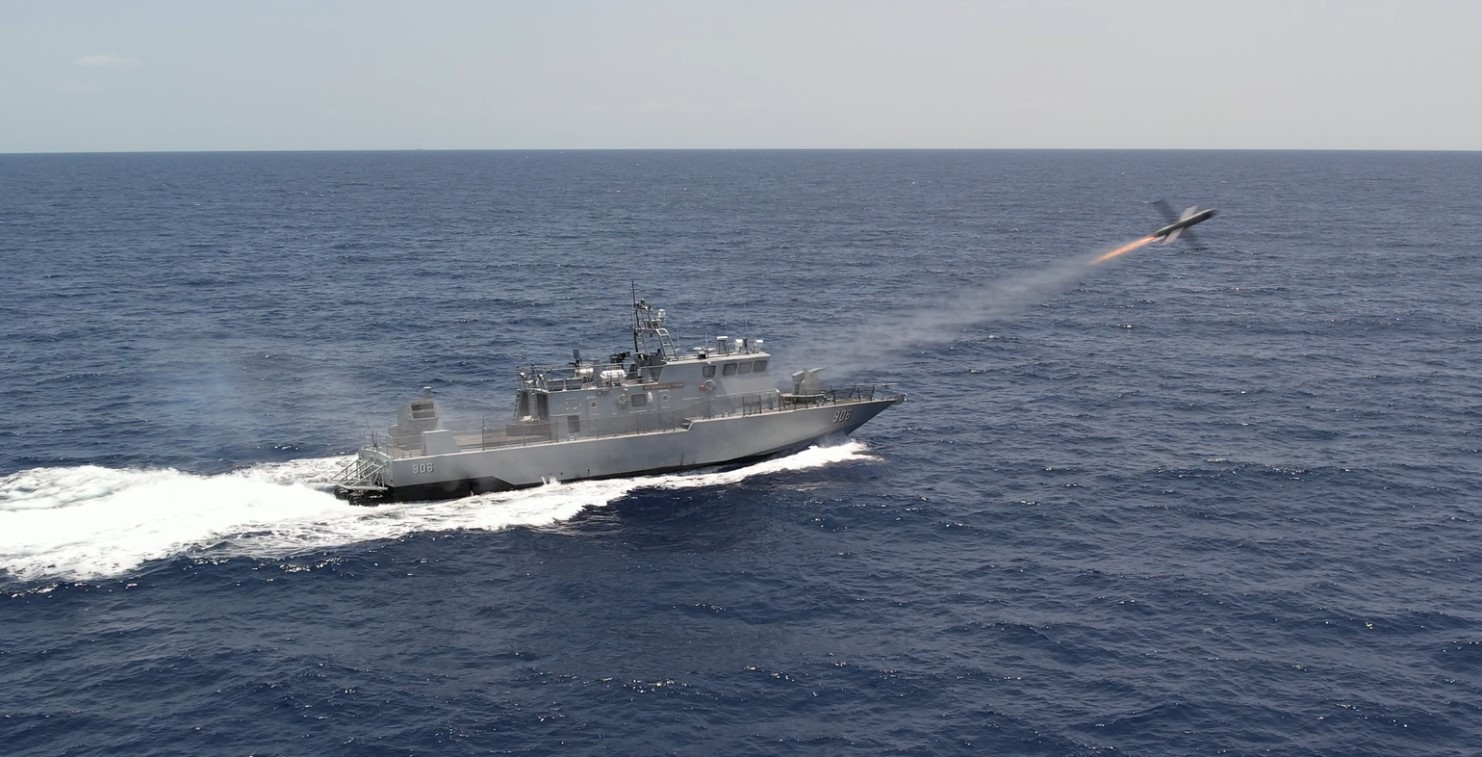
The BRP Herminigildo Yurong of the Philippine Navy testing the Spike NLOS system.

Philippines
The Philippine Navy operates the Spike ER and Spike NLOS variants of the missile. The Spike ER is deployed on board the missile-capable versions of the Multipurpose Assault Craft. The Spike NLOS variants are deployed on board the AW159 Wildcat helicopters and Acero-class fast attack interdiction craft.
Poland
A total of 2,675 Spike LR missiles with 264 launchers and training systems were ordered in 2003 in a deal worth $425 million with deliveries completed by 2013. A follow-up order of 800 more Spike LR missiles for use on the Rosomak IFV, in a deal including local production in Poland, was placed in 2015 with deliveries between 2019 and 2022.
Portugal
An unknown quantity of Eurospike LR2 launchers and missiles were acquired by the Portuguese Army in 2025 through NATO Support and Procurement Agency, in a contract worth €20 million.

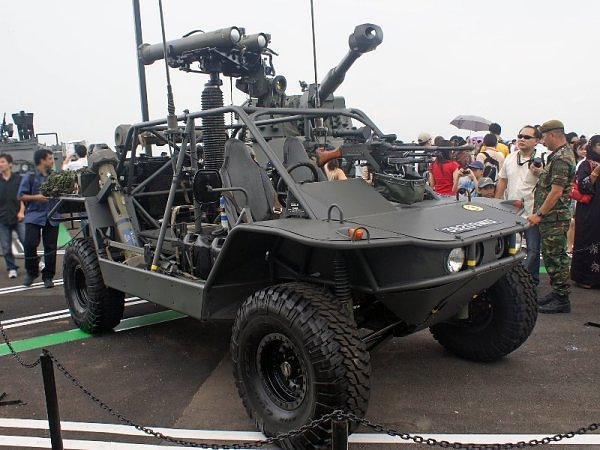
Singapore Airshow 2008, a locally developed twin-tube launcher for the Spike as mounted on a Light Strike Vehicle of the Singapore Army.

Romania
Total 3,000 missiles; breakdown being 2,000 Spike LR (for use on MLI-84 M1 IFV) with the remaining 1,000 being Spike ER (for use on IAR 330 SOCAT attack helicopters). An unspecified number of portable Spike LR launchers are also in service.

Moldova
SPIKE-LR version acquired in 2026 as new anti-tank guided missile system for national army inventory. To be displayed at Moldovan independence day on Humvees.

Singapore
In 1999, Singapore became the second country to acquire the Spike ATGM. Total 1,500 Spike LR missiles (with associated launchers and training systems) received between 2001 and 2006. Between 2017 and 2018, another 500 Spike SR was received as the new generation anti-tank guided missile for its infantry battalions. Spikes variants are produced locally by ST Engineering. The Hunter AFV of the Singapore Army is equipped with a twin tube pop-up launcher. There has been further orders for the Spike LR 2 for use on the Hunter AFV and infantry units.
Slovakia
Spike LR2 (100 missiles, 10 launchers).
Slovenia
The Spike MR and Spike LR have been in operational use in the Slovenian Armed Forces since 2009. Total 75 missiles. In September 2022, EuroSpike was awarded a $6.6 million contract to supply 50 Spike LR2.
Switzerland
The Swiss Armed Forces selected the Spike LR2 as its long-range anti-tank guided missile system for ground troops in 2023. It will replace the TOW ATGM.
South Korea
A South Korean government deal concluded on 6 September 2011 confirmed the procurement of unspecified numbers of Spike NLOS, of which about 50 missiles will be forward deployed to the South Korean islands of Baengnyeongdo and Yeonpyeongdo, close to the Northern Limit Line with North Korea. On 19 May 2013 the South Korean military confirmed that "dozens" of Spike missiles had been deployed on the islands. The Republic of Korea Navy will also deploy the Spike NLOS on AgustaWestland AW159 Wildcat helicopters, and the Republic of Korea Marine Corps has the Spike NLOS mounted on Plasan Sand Cat light vehicle.

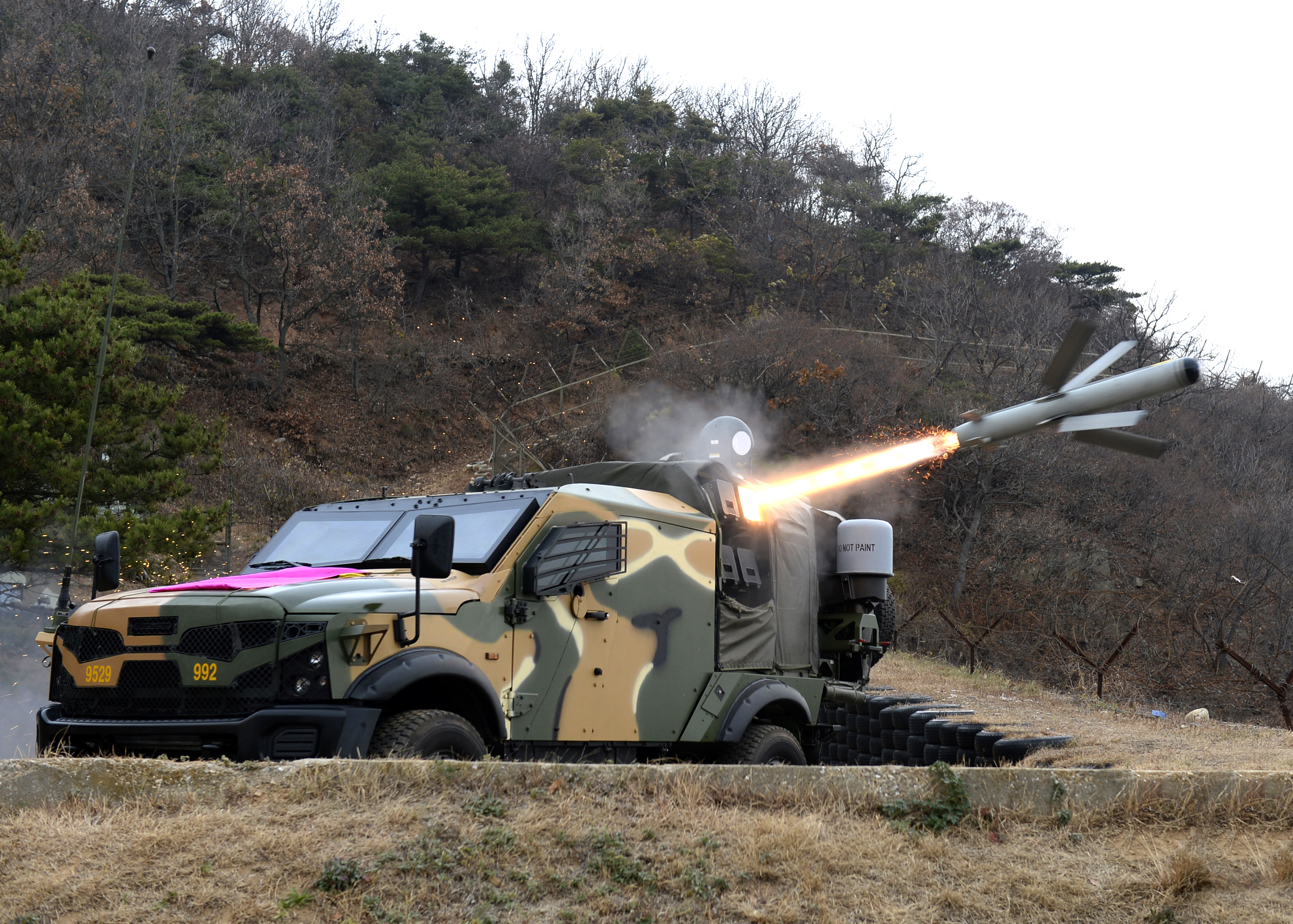
Spike-NLOS being fired from a Plasan Sand Cat.

Thailand
Under a deal reached in 2020, the Royal Thai Army took delivery of the Spike MR missiles and launchers. Spike-MR was a contender along with Javelin.
United States
The Spike was offered by Rafael Advanced Defense Systems as a possible contender in the US Army JAWS missile program in 1996. In January 2020, the Army revealed it would field the Spike NLOS on AH-64 Apache helicopters as an interim solution to acquire a longer range stand-off weapon.

=== Former operators ===
United Kingdom
600 Spike NLOS missiles were procured by the British Army, the exact breakdown being 200 NLOS Mk.2, 200 NLOS Mk.4 and 200 NLOS Mk.5 ordered in the years 2007, 2008 and 2009, respectively. In British service it has the name 'Exactor'. Operated by 26th Regiment RA, and retired in 2024.

=== Contract cancellation ===
Spain
Total 2,630 Spike LR (including 260 launchers and associated training systems) and 200 Spike ER missiles (for use by Eurocopter Tiger attack helicopters). A total of 236 launchers and 2,360 Spike LR missiles was assigned to the Spanish Army, while the remaining 24 launchers and 240 missiles was assigned to the Spanish Marines. In June 2025, the Spanish government announced having cancelled the contract due to a disagreement with the Israeli military actions in Gaza.

=== Evaluations ===
Turkey
In January 1998, a partnership arrangement was announced between Israel Aerospace Industries and Kamov to market the Kamov Ka-50-2 attack helicopter in Turkish competition. One of the optional armaments being offered for the Ka-50-2 was the Spike ER missile. Eventually, Ka-50-2 lost to TAI/AgustaWestland T129 ATAK. Turkey has also examined the use of Rafael Overhead Weapon Station with Spike for its Otokar Cobra light armored vehicles.
United Kingdom
In February 2001, the British MoD awarded two contracts valued at $8.8 million for a year-long assessment of the Javelin and Spike MR. The Spike was being offered by Rafael Advanced Defense Systems teamed with Matra BAe Dynamics, while the Javelin was being offered by a team of Lockheed Martin and Raytheon. The UK would like to field a lightweight antitank missile system for its Joint Rapid Reaction Force by 2005. In February 2003, the British MoD selected the Javelin.

=== Failed bids ===
Portugal
A total of 2 Spike LR launchers would be fitted on Portuguese Marine Corps Pandur II IFV APC's, but the program was cancelled due to problems between the Portuguese government, Steyr-Daimler-Puch and Fabrequipa (local Pandur II manufacturer).

== See also ==
- Akeron MP – (France)
- ALAS – (Serbia)
- AT-1K Raybolt – (South Korea)
- HJ-12 – (China)
- MPATGM – (India)
- OMTAS – (Turkey)
- Sadid-1 – (Iran)
- Stugna-P – (Ukraine)
- Type 01 LMAT – (Japan)
- Bulsae-4 – (North Korea)
