= List of uses of CS gas by country =

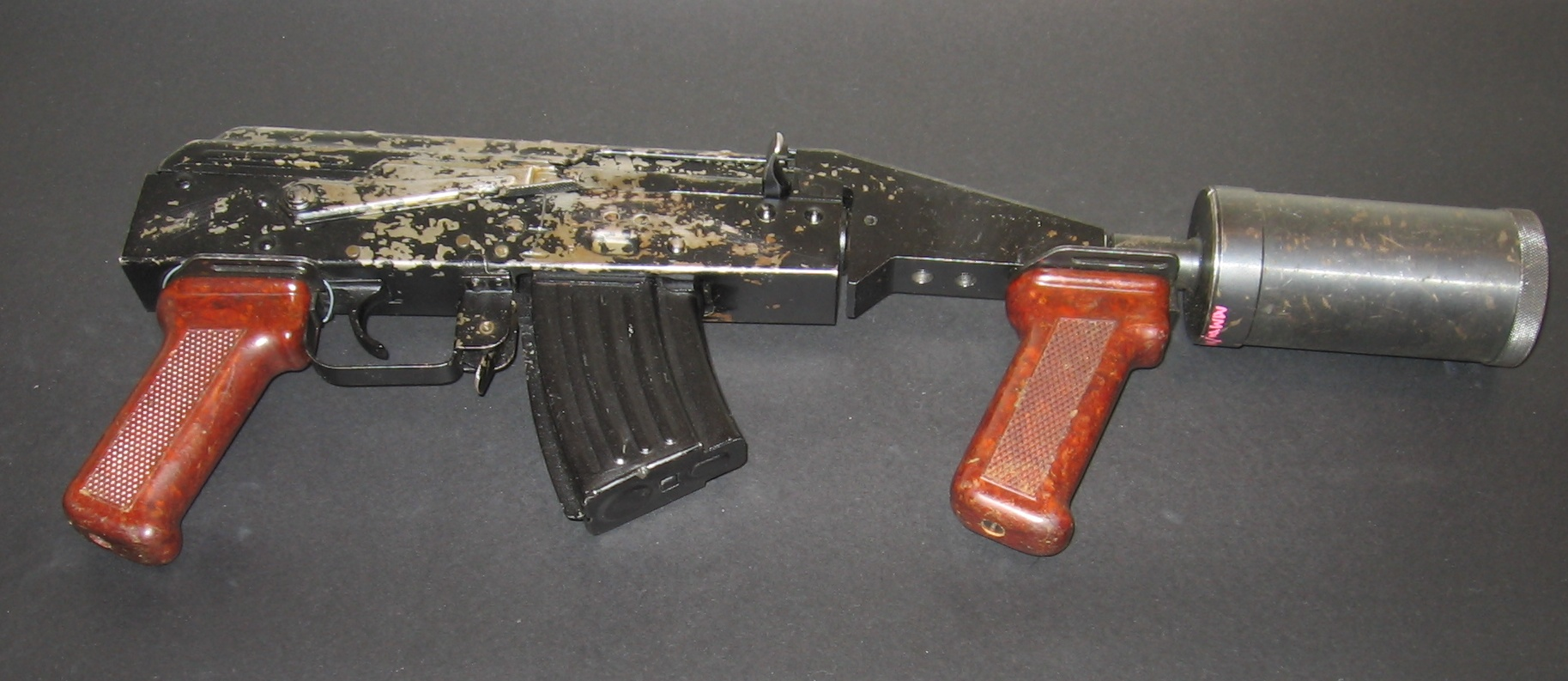
RWGŁ-3 Polish tear gas grenade launcher.

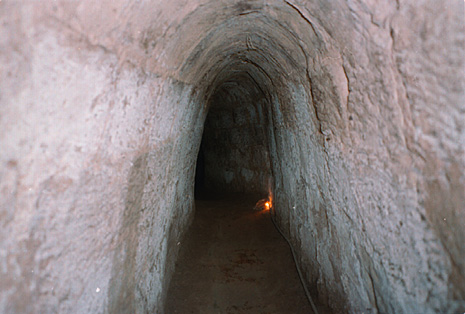
CS was used during attempts to flush the Viet Cong from their tunnels in the Vietnam War.

CS gas has been used in spray form by many police forces as a temporary incapacitant and to subdue attackers, persons, or civil protestors. Officers who are trained in the use and application of CS spray are routinely exposed to it as part of their training. It has also been used in criminal attacks in various countries.

Use of CS in war is prohibited under the terms of the Chemical Weapons Convention, signed by most countries in 1993 with all but five other states signing between 1994 and 1997. The reasoning behind the prohibition is pragmatic: use of CS by one combatant could easily trigger retaliation with much more toxic chemical weapons such as nerve agents. Only five countries have not signed the Chemical Weapons Convention and are therefore unhindered by restrictions on the use of CS gas: Angola, Egypt, North Korea, Somalia, and South Sudan.

== Bahrain ==
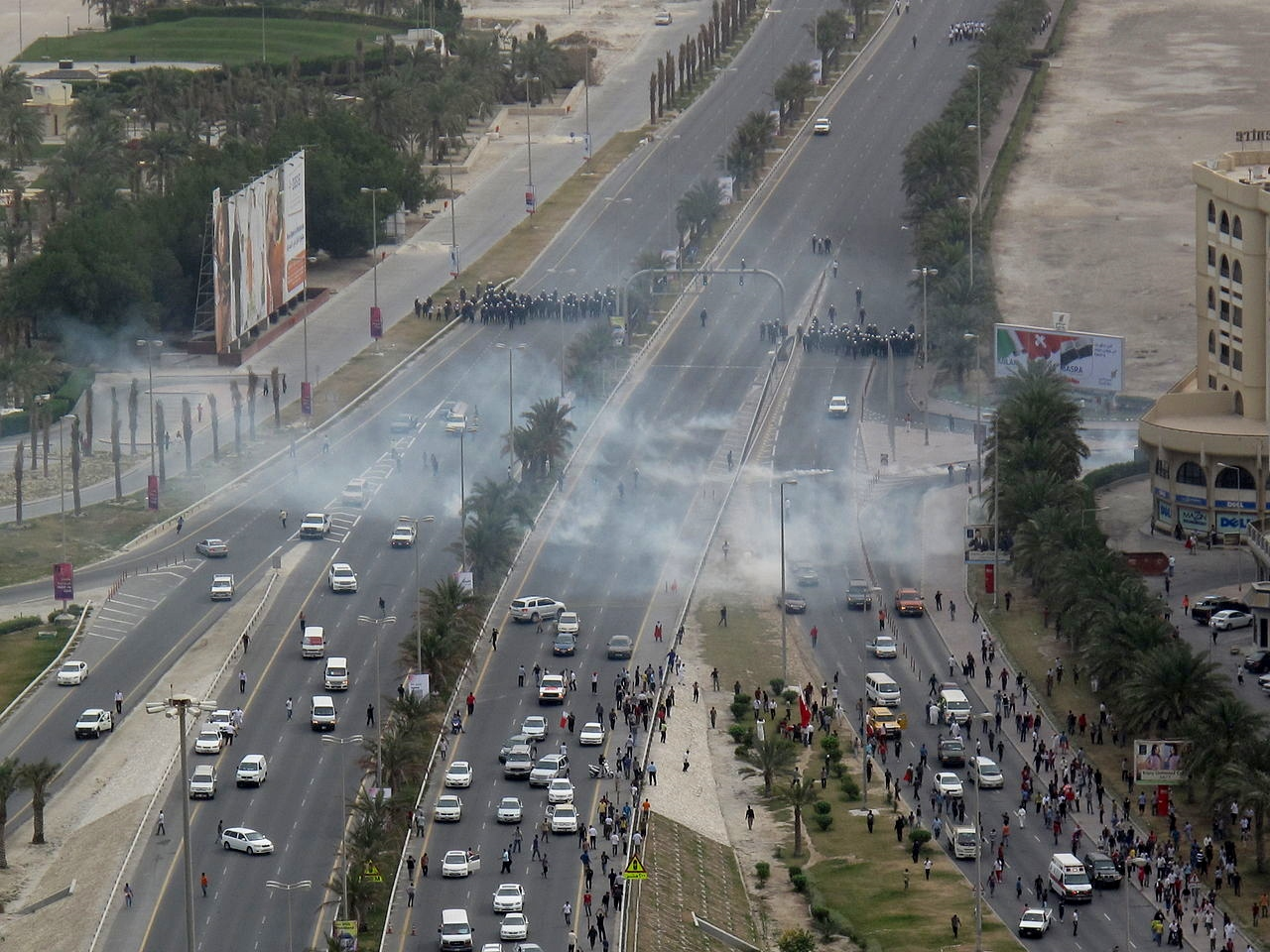
Bahrain riot police use tear gas on protesters in Manama during 2011-2012 Bahraini uprising

CS gas was used extensively by Bahrain's police from the start of the Bahraini uprising. The Bahrain Independent Commission of Inquiry concluded that Bahrain's police used a disproportionate amount of CS gas when dispersing protests, and that in some situations, police fired CS gas into private homes in an "unnecessary and indiscriminate" manner. In one particular incident witnessed by Commission investigators, police fired "at least four tear gas canisters (each containing six projectiles) ... from a short range into the kitchen and living room of a home."

According to opposition activists and families of the dead, ten individuals died as a result of CS gas between 25 March 2011 and 17 December 2011. One allegedly died from the impact of the CS gas canister, and the remainder are said to have died from the effects of inhaling the gas. The Bahrain Independent Commission of Inquiry received information that a further three deaths may have been attributable to the use of CS gas. Of these three, one allegedly died from the impact of the canister, and two from the effects of inhaling the gas.

== Canada ==
The Canadian Forces exposes basic training candidates to CS gas as part of CBRN training. Similar drills take place throughout a member's care. Many law enforcement agencies also use CS gas as a riot control device. Since 2008, the SPVM police force in Montreal has increased its use of CS Gas for crowd control, although Police policy is to only use it as a last resort. Several incidents where protesters have been seriously injured by having CS gas fired at them from point-blank range have raised concerns about the methodology and training of Officers in the Montreal Riot Squad, particularly in relation to "Use of Force".

== Chile ==
Tear gas is routinely used in Chile by Carabineros, to disrupt civilian protests. During the 2019 uprising the use of expired gas has been reported, prompting Carabineros to say that "they are like yogurt expired 5 days ago, it doesn’t damage people".

== Peru ==
Peru Police forces spray CS gas in riot control situations.

== Cyprus ==
CS was first tested in the field by the British army in Cyprus in 1958. At this time it was known by the code name T792.

== Egypt ==
CS has been widely used by Egyptian Police/Military Forces from January 2011 onwards.

== Hong Kong ==
The Police Tactical Unit of the Hong Kong Police Force used 87 rounds of CS projectiles (both riot gun launched and hand thrown) in Hong Kong on 28 September 2014 against thousands of protesters obstructing major thoroughfares in Hong Kong 2014 Hong Kong protests, also known as the Umbrella Movement.

The CS gas canisters and content used were purchased by the Hong Kong SAR Government from CHEMRING, a British weapons manufacturer. The crowd used umbrellas to fend off the gas, which was often ineffective. Apart from the HK police, CS gas spray is also used by Witness Protection and Firearms Section of Independent Commission Against Corruption (Hong Kong).

From 12 June to 4 August 2019, police used 1000 tear gas canisters. Then, on the single day of 5 August, police fired more than 800 tear gas canisters in their operations throughout almost every district of the city. In one instance, a tear gas canister was deployed indoors, in Kwai Fong station during a march, on 11 August 2019. The police initially denied the incident. In defense, protestors are seen picking up tear gas cans with thick gloves to throw them back or to extinguish them in sealed water containers.

Up to 22 October 2019, over 5000 made-in-China tear gas canisters have been deployed by the Hong Kong Police Force. Canisters marked with dates overdue have been collected in many occasions. It is unpredictable for the potential hazards to the Hong Kong environment and living conditions. Recent massive deaths of fish around Hong Kong seas was also suspected to be one of the consequences. Many birds were found dead in the Chinese University of Hong Kong, after 12 November that the riot police fired over 2000 tear gases towards the campus. A Hong Kong journalist, Chan Yu-hong from the Stand News declared he was diagnosed with chloracne (by a Traditional Chinese physician instead of a physician) after exposure to made-in-China tear gas while covering the 2019 Hong Kong protests.

The overuse of tear gas has been one of the concerns in the anti-extradition bill protests.

== Iraq ==
Iraq successfully developed CS during the 1970s and during the 1980s produced tons of the substance firstly at Salman Pak and later at al-Muthanna.

Blackwater Worldwide, acting as an agent of the United States, deployed CS in the Iraq War from a helicopter hovering over a checkpoint in the Green Zone in Baghdad.

Iraqi security forces deploying military-grade grenades from Iran and Bulgaria against protesters in Baghdad.

== Israel ==
Israel Police forces spray CS gas in riot control situations. It is widely used at demonstrations within the Palestinian Territories and at the Israeli West Bank barrier.

== Palestinian Authority ==
Palestinian Authority forces used CS gas against protesters in Ramallah on June 26, 2021 and against rioters in Nablus in September, 2022.

== Philippines ==
CS tear gas was used in suppression of the mutiny in Makati that was led by Sen. Antonio Trillanes. The tear gas was fired in the building and all the people in the building including reporters were affected.

== Romania ==
The Gendarmerie of Bucharest used large quantities of CS gas against civilians during the protests of 10 August 2018 in Bucharest.

== Russia ==
Russia developed in the late 1970s a K-51 grenade for riot control and for other tactical operations. The K-51 burns for 16 seconds, producing a thick CS smoke. Reportedly used in the Donetsk region of Ukraine in 2015, it has been reported in use again in the 2022 Russian invasion of Ukraine, being dropped by drones and in Ukraine in 2024.

== Spain ==
Tear gas is not commonly used in Spain but it has been used some times to disrupt civilian protests by the Policia Nacional and Mossos d'Esquadra in Catalonia.

== Sri Lanka ==
The LTTE, also known as Tamil Tigers of Sri Lanka, an insurgent group in Sri Lanka used CS gas against government forces in September 2008. Its use hindered the army's progress but ultimately proved ineffective in preventing the army from overrunning LTTE positions.

This is one of the few cases of insurgents using CS gas.

== Sudan ==
Sudanese forces extensively used CS gas during the latest wave of demonstrations began in 2018. The use of CS gas fired through rifles or hand grenades is not exclusive to police forces but is widely used by non-trained militia to suppress protesters movement and to intimidate civilians by firing blindly into neighborhoods and homes. CS gas canisters are generally used also as a ballistic weapon and aimed at the faces of protesters to cause serious body and head injuries. Some death cases were recorded due to choking on tear gas because of excessive use in confined areas.

== United Kingdom ==
=== Northern Ireland ===
CS gas was used extensively in the Bogside area of Derry, Northern Ireland during the "Battle of the Bogside", a two-day riot in August 1969. A total of 1,091 canisters containing 12.5g of CS each, and 14 canisters containing 50 g of CS each, were released in the densely populated residential area. On 30 August the Himsworth Inquiry was set up to investigate the medical effects of its use in Derry. Its conclusions, viewed in the political context of the time, still pointed towards the necessity of further testing of CS gas before being used as a riot control agent. During the rioting in Belfast, the following year, known as the Falls Curfew, the Army fired up to 1,600 canisters into the densely populated Falls Road area. It was also used in Lenadoon on 9 July 1972 on the breakdown of the IRA ceasefire. Not long after, the British Army and Royal Ulster Constabulary ceased using CS in Northern Ireland.

=== Great Britain ===
==== CS gas ====
CS gas has not been routinely deployed on the British mainland. It has seen use in rare cases. The first use of CS gas on the UK mainland that was not part of military training was carried out in 1944 during a hostage siege at a north London address. Soldiers were asked to throw CS grenades through the skylight in hope of bringing the incident to a speedy conclusion, but the hostage-taker had brought his civilian-issue gas mask with him, negating the effect. The siege of Trough Gate 1973 in Oldham was the second non-military use of CS gas on the UK mainland. During a four-hour standoff, Frank Alan Stockton shot at police but was flushed from his home with CS gas and police dogs.

During the 1980 assault on the Iranian Embassy, SAS soldiers used CS gas contained within stun grenades to incapacitate the militants who had kept the building under siege for six days. All but one of the remaining hostages were saved and all but one of the hostage-takers were killed, with the other being taken into custody.

In 1981, CS gas was used to quell rioting in the Toxteth area of Liverpool.

Following the 2011 England riots, there was consideration given to making CS gas, water cannon and other riot control measures available to police for use in the event of serious disorder. The British Armed Forces use CS gas annually to test their chemical, biological, radiological and nuclear defense (CBRN) equipment. During initial training they introduce recruits to CS gas by placing them in a small enclosed space known as a Confidence Test Facility (CTF) and igniting chemical tablets to induce CS production. After recruits have carried out their CBRN drills, they must remove their respirators so that they are exposed to the CS for up to 20 seconds to experience its effects and become confident their respirators work.

==== CS spray ====
CS incapacitant spray had been used routinely by the British police since its introduction in 1996. It was issued as an item of equipment to police officers for protection and to assist in dealing with violent incidents. British police recruits are typically exposed to CS aerosol, in a controlled environment, as part of their basic training. A six-month trial by sixteen police forces in England began on 1 March 1996. CS spray was used in the UK more than 10,000 times in the period between its introduction in 1996 and September 1998. Forces began replacing CS spray with Captor or PAVA spray, due to its non-flammable nature. This allowed use in conjunction with Tasers, which have been rolled out more widely. As a result, CS spray is now redundant – with Captor or PAVA used by all forces.

The CS spray used by police forces was in the form of a hand-held aerosol canister containing a 5% solution of CS dissolved in methyl isobutyl ketone and propelled by pressurized nitrogen. The CS spray used by UK police was generally more concentrated than that used by American police forces (5% vs 1%). The liquid stream is directed where the user points the canister, being accurate up to 4 metres. Police are also trained in helping the incapacitated person recover once successfully restrained. Under Section 5 of the Firearms Act, CS and other incapacitant sprays are classed as prohibited weapons, making it unlawful for a member of the public to possess them.

On 16 March 1996, a Gambian asylum seeker, Ibrahima Sey, was taken to Ilford Police Station in east London. Whilst incapacitating Sey, who was suffering from excited delirium, police sprayed him with CS spray and held him on the ground for approximately 15 minutes, and he subsequently died. In 1999, the mental health charity MIND called for a suspension of the use of CS spray on mentally ill people until it was proved to be safe. In February 2006, Dan Ford, from Wareham in Dorset, received permanent scarring to his face after being sprayed with CS during an arrest by police. Ford was subsequently advised by doctors to stay out of sunlight for at least 12 months. After the incident, his cousin, Donna Lewis, was quoted as saying, "To look at him, it was like looking at a melting man, with liquid oozing from his face."

== United States ==
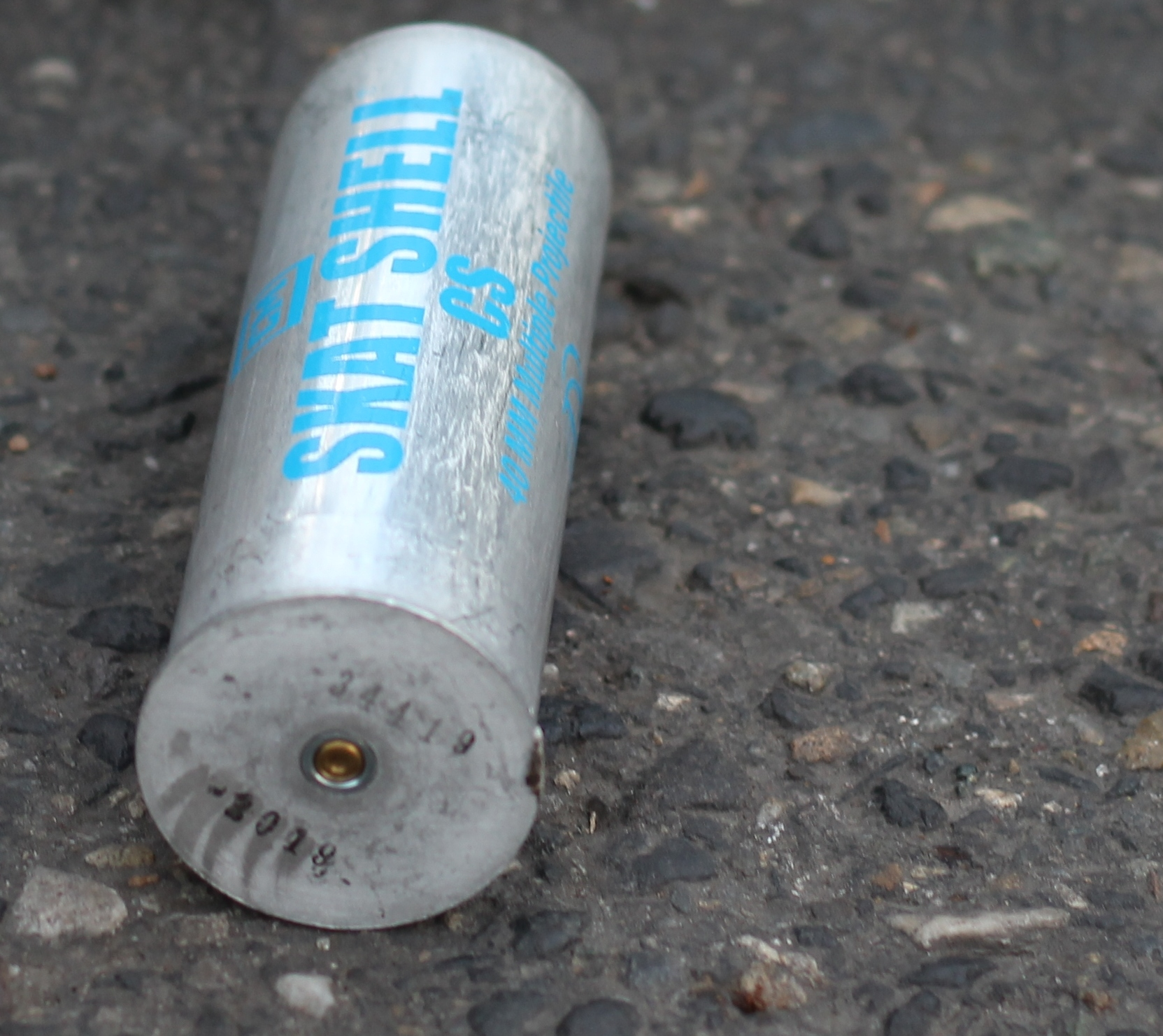
40mm CS gas canister used during the 2020 George Floyd protests in Portland, Oregon

CS is used by many police forces within the United States. It was used by Federal Bureau of Investigation law enforcement officials in the 1993 Waco Siege. Riot police in Pittsburgh, Pennsylvania in September 2009 used CS gas and riot control techniques to disperse assemblies in the vicinity of the 2009 G-20 Pittsburgh summit. Tear gas was used in at least 100 cities during the 2020 protests that took place in the U.S. In Portland, Oregon alone, tear gas was used more than 100 times in a two-week period and there were at least two nights in which it was used more than twenty times.

In Berkeley, California during the Bloody Thursday events in the People's Park on 21 May 1969, a midday memorial was held for student James Rector, a non-protester shot and killed by police, at Sproul Plaza on the university campus. In his honor, several thousand people peacefully assembled to listen to speakers remembering his life. National Guard troops surrounded Sproul Plaza, donned their gas masks, and pointed their bayonets inward, while helicopters dropped CS gas directly on the trapped crowd. No escape was possible, and the gas caused acute respiratory distress, disorientation, temporary blindness and vomiting. Many people, including children and the elderly, were injured during the ensuing panic. The gas was so intense that breezes carried it into Cowell Memorial Hospital, endangering patients, interrupting operations and incapacitating nurses. Students at nearby Jefferson and Franklin elementary schools were also affected.

Members of the United States armed forces are exposed to CS during initial training, and during training refresher courses or equipment maintenance exercises, using CS tablets that are melted on a hotplate. This is to demonstrate the importance of properly wearing a military gas mask or protective mask, as the agent's presence quickly reveals an improper fit or seal of the mask's rubber gaskets against the face. Following exposure while wearing a mask, recruits are ordered to remove the masks and endure exposure in the room. These exercises also encourage confidence in the ability of the equipment to protect the wearer from such chemical attacks. Such an event is a requirement for graduation from United States Army Basic Training, Air Force Basic Military Training, Navy Basic Training, and Marine Corps recruit training. CS gas in the form of grenades is also used extensively in the United States Marine Corps and United States Army in some service schools. CS gas is used during the final field exercise of the Scout Sniper Basic Course to simulate being compromised. In addition, it is used during the 25 km (16 mi) escape-and-evasion exercise ("Trail of Tears"), the last event before graduation from the course. Navy Corpsmen participating in Field Medic training in order to serve with the Marines must go through their second CS gas exercise before finally arriving at their unit. It is also used during several events in the Marine Corps Basic Reconnaissance Course (BRC) including some rucksack runs and escape-and-evasion exercises. While students going through the course are given the opportunity to bring and wear a gas mask for the event, usually none are worn because once donned, gas masks could not be removed until the end of the exercise. This could last anywhere from 3–12 hours and would make running 25 km (15 miles) while wearing 125 lb (57 kg) of gear virtually impossible.

== Vietnam ==
It has been reported that thousands of tons of CS gas were used by the U.S. forces in Vietnam to bring Viet Cong into the open. It was also used by the North Vietnamese forces in some battles like Hue in 1968 or during the Easter Offensive in 1972.

== Elsewhere ==
CS gas has been and is still routinely used by Greek riot police (MAT) in order to quell student and labour protests, as well as riots.

CS was used to quell a protest in Lusaka, Zambia in July 1997 and the 1999 WTO riots in Seattle. Amnesty International reported that it had been manufactured by the UK company Pains-Wessex. Subsequently, Amnesty called for an export ban when the receiving regime is either not fully trained in the use of CS, or had shown usage "contrary to the manufacturer’s instructions".

In September 2000, the Guardian newspaper revealed how a UK company, HPP, used legal loopholes to export CS to a private security company in Rwanda, in breach of United Nations sanctions. The Guardian also reported that CS was used by the Hutu militia in Rwanda to flush Tutsis out of buildings before hacking them to death.

CS has been used by the government in South Africa; by Israel against Palestinians and Israelis; by the South Korean government in Seoul, and during the Balkan conflicts by Serbia. In Malta it was used by police between 1981 and 1987 to the detriment of Nationalist Party Supporters.

CS tear gas was used at the G8 protests in Genoa, Italy and Quebec City, Canada during the FTAA anti-globalization demonstrations during the Quebec City Summit of the Americas.

The Malaysia Federal Reserve Unit has also been known to use CS tear gas against its citizens who rallied for clean and fair elections under what were called Bersih rallies in 2011 and 2012.

The Canadian, Norwegian, Dutch, Finnish and Australian Defence Forces train their personnel with CS gas in a manner similar to that of the US, as it is a basic part of CBRN (Chemical, Biological, Radiological, Nuclear) training. Gas is released by burning tablets, usually in a building reserved for this purpose (a "gas hut"). In the training, the person enters the building unprotected and must fit and clear the gas mask before leaving. Other drills such as drinking and under-mask decontamination are also practiced. Some Norwegian units are exposed to CS gas while engaged in mental and physical activity such as addressing the officer in command by stating name, rank, and troop before doing 30 push-ups.

In Australia, prison officers used CS gas against five teenage boys in Darwin's Don Dale Juvenile Detention Centre in August 2014.
