= Police of Poland =

Law enforcement agency of Poland

Police
- Wordmark

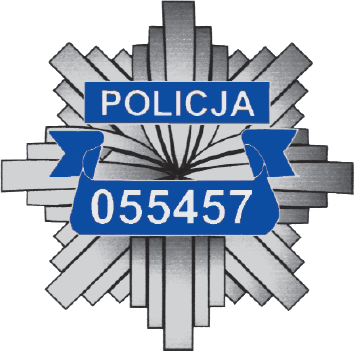
- Badge

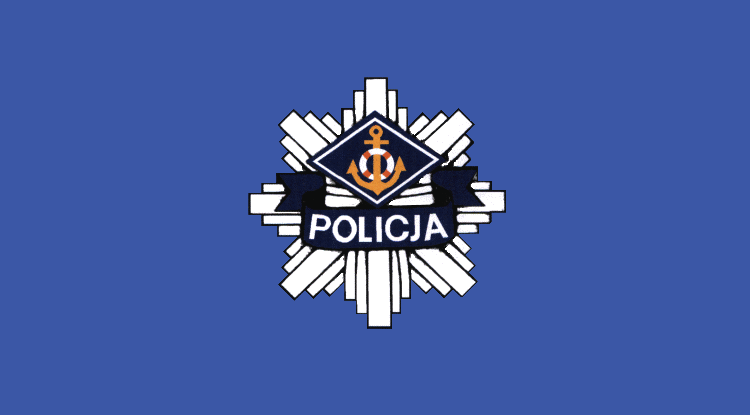
- Vessels flag

Agency overview
- Formed: 10 May 1990
- Preceding agency: Citizens' Militia
- Annual budget: 12 billion PLN (2022)

Jurisdictional structure
- National agency: PL
- Operations jurisdiction: PL
- Jurisdiction of the Policja
- Constituting instruments: Act on the Policja, 1990, April 6; Order no. 2 of the Policja's Komendant Główny Policji (Policja Commander in Chief) of 17 January 2006 on the regulations of the Komenda Główna Policji (General Headquarters of Policja)
- General nature: Civilian police

Operational structure
- Headquarters: Warsaw
- Police officers: 93,637 (June 2024)
- Staff members: 11,770 (June 2024)
- Minister responsible: Marcin Kierwiński, Minister of the Interior and Administration
- Agency executive: Marek Boroń, Commander-in-Chief
- Units: National Headquarters; 17 regional commands; 5 special units

Website
- www.policja.pl

The Police (Polish: Policja, [pɔˈlit͡sja]) is the national civilian police service of Poland. It is the country’s primary law enforcement agency, responsible for public security and order as well as the prevention and investigation of crime. It operates under the authority of the Ministry of the Interior and Administration.

Polish Police is headed by the Commander-in-Chief of Police, subordinate to the Minister of the Interior and Administration. The Police is supported by municipal forces of city guards, having less legal authority and with jurisdiction only over prosecuting contraventions.

== Terminology ==
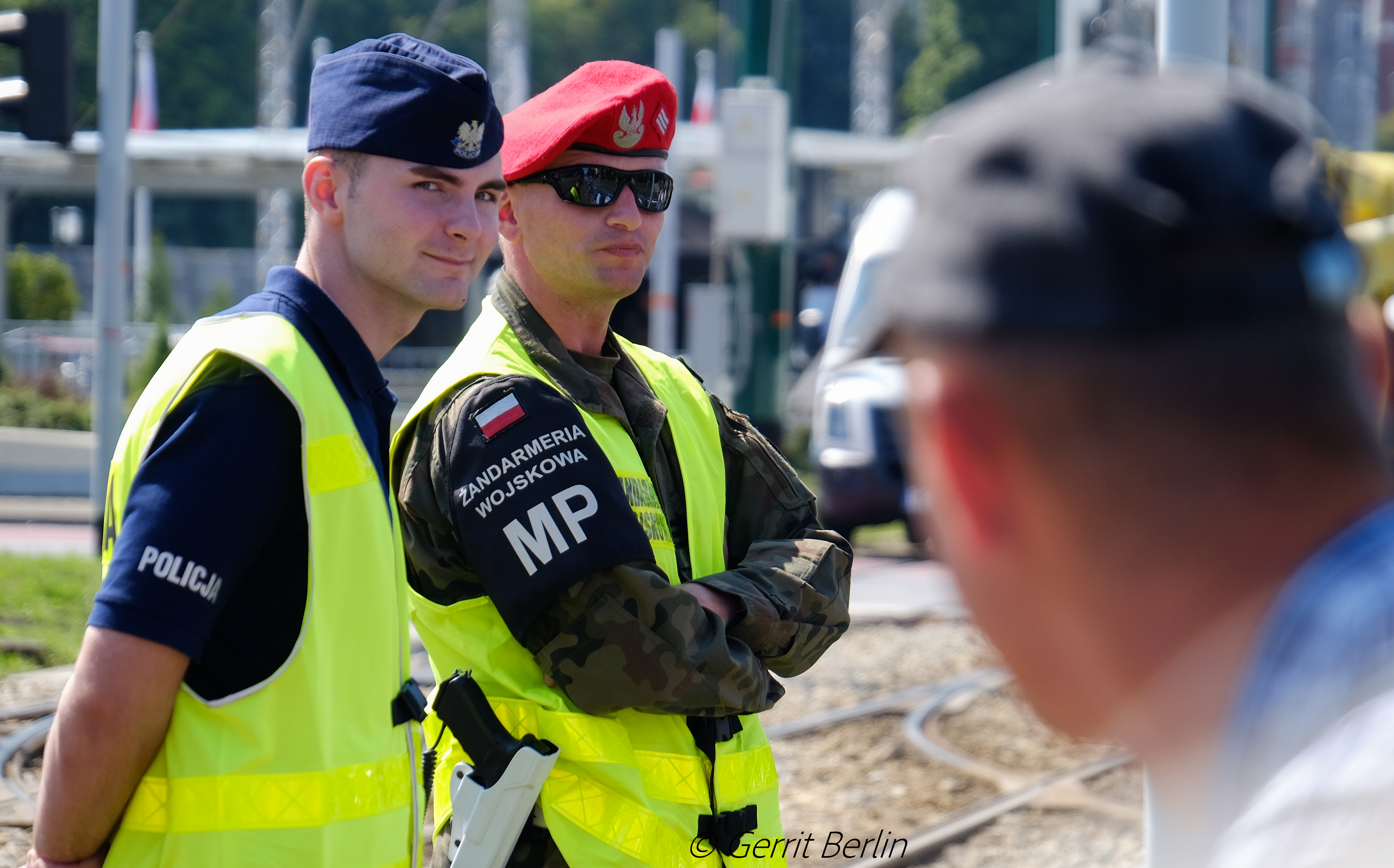
A police officer on duty with a member of the Military Gendarmerie.

The force's name, Policja, translates into the English language as Police.

An individual officer is typically called a policjant (plural policjanci); these are not, however, official titles and are not included in the official rank structure, they are simply terms used to refer to any police officer regardless of the rank they may hold. A police station is known as Komenda Policji or Komisariat Policji both of which translate more or less into English as Police Commissariat. Female officers may be referred to as policjantki, the singular of which is policjantka.

On the whole, officers' individual ranks are not used by the general public and thus when addressing an officer, it is common to hear the term Pan (female - Pani), Polish for mister/miss used to refer to police officers. On occasion, this may or may not be followed by the terms Oficer or Funkcjonariusz.

== History ==
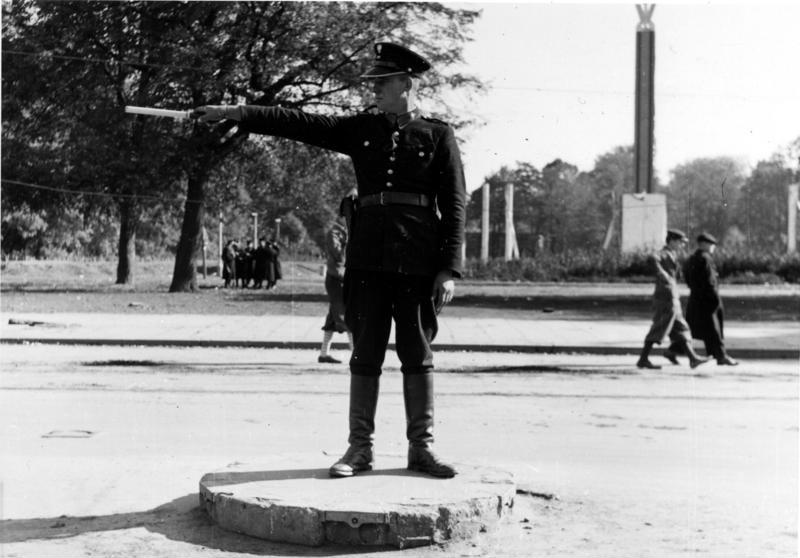
An officer of the State Police on traffic duty in Warsaw during German occupation, 1939

In 1919, with the re-independence of the Polish nation, the state reorganised itself along non-federalist lines and established a centralised form of government. Under the auspices of the new government and with assistance from a British mission of soldiers and police officers led by Brigadier-General Gordon Macready, a new national police force was formed; this State Police then existed as the primary law enforcement agency for the entire nation up until the outbreak of the Second World War in 1939. During the inter-war period, a number of key law enforcement duties were delegated to other formations, such as the Border Guard and Military Gendarmerie.

With the end of World War II and the onset of the communist period, the new Soviet backed government decided to radically change the structure of policing in Poland; the state 'Policja' was renamed as the 'Milicja Obywatelska' (Citizen's Militia), a name which was meant to reflect a change in the role of the police, from an instrument of oppression ensuring the position of the bourgeoisie, to a force composed of, and at the service of 'normal citizens'. Ironically the reality turned out to be largely the opposite and the Milicja instead represented a rather state-controlled force which was used to exert political repression on the citizens. The Milicja was, for the most part, detested by the general populace; events such as the police's conduct during the Gdańsk Shipyard Strike and surrounding the Popiełuszko affair, only worsened the people's view of their law enforcement agencies.

After the fall of the communist government in Poland, the system was reformed once again, this time reviving the pre-war name of 'Policja' and albeit with a few minor changes, the general system of law-enforcement of the Second Republic.

== Equipment ==
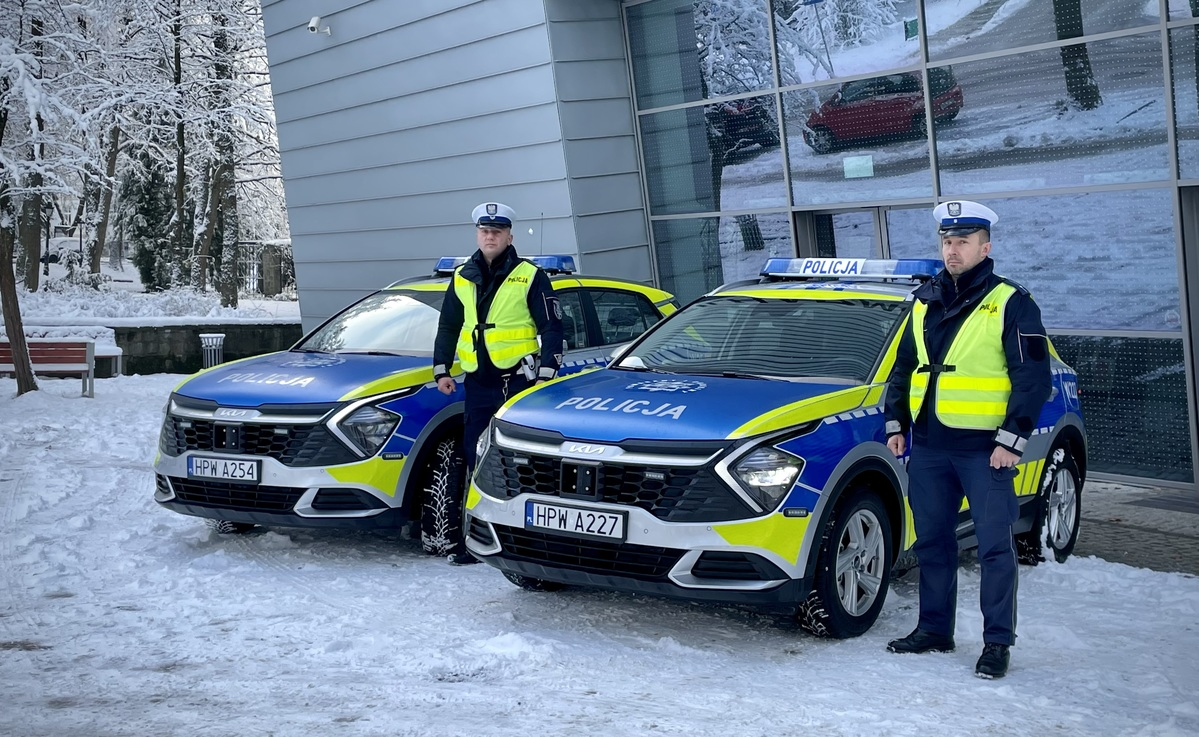
Highways police with their service vehicles.

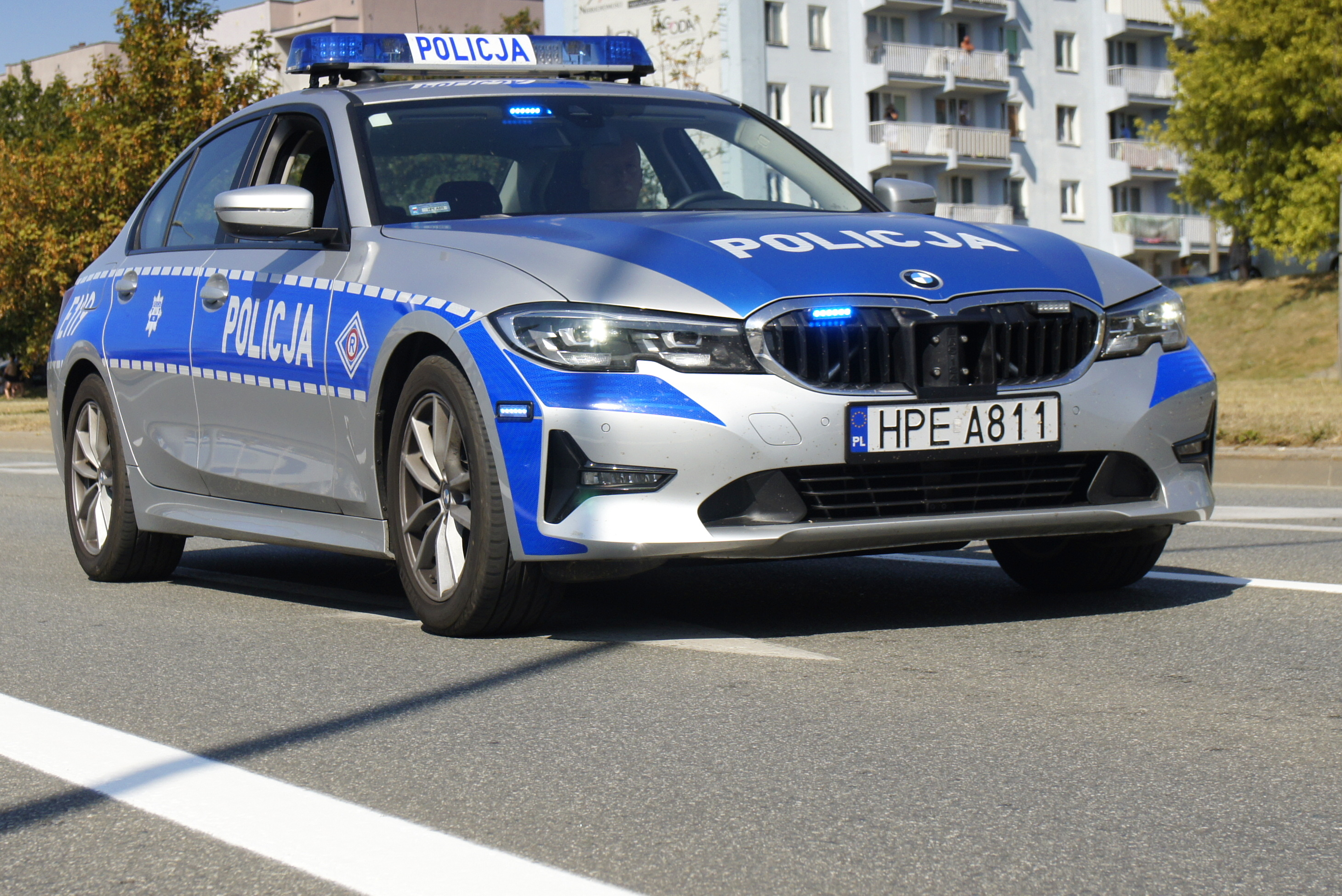
BMW 3 Series used as a patrol car for the Polish police, which entered service in 2019

Today, most common types include various models from Kia (Cee'd model - ca. 4000 in use) Škoda (mainly Octavia), Alfa Romeo, Ford Mondeo, Opel (mainly Opel Astra), Volkswagen, and Toyota, as of 2011 the FSO Polonez (manufactured in Poland) is no longer in use. The Polish police force has, since joining the European Union, been undergoing a thorough restructuring and has in the process acquired a large number of new vehicles; as of 2011 this process is still ongoing and new vehicles are constantly being procured in order to replace ageing old patrol cars as their service lives come to an end. In addition to standard sedan and hatchback model vehicles, the Policja has been investing significant amounts of money in developing their ability to respond to any incident no matter where it may be, this has in turn led to the purchase of a large number of all-terrain 4x4 vehicles and multi-purpose vans and trucks. This expansion in capabilities was a stated requirement of the police force's restructuring program.

Beginning in 2009, the painting scheme is being modified to a silver body design with blue reflective strip, similar to modern German police cars.

Traditionally, vehicles were painted a dark blue color with side doors painted in white, and with white stripes and the word "POLICJA" on both sides. Earlier versions (used at the beginning of the 1990s) had a thinner stripe with the word "POLICJA" written under it. This design was adopted from the paint scheme used by the communist milicja. Some formerly used vehicles even had visible traces of the word "POLICJA" being corrected from "MILICJA", with the first two letters in a different shade of white, on a patch of a different shade of blue.

All uniformed and most non-uniformed officers of the state police are routinely armed. In addition to their firearm, Policja officers carry handcuffs and a number of other pieces of equipment which usually includes a personal radio system for communication with other officers and their police station. Pepper spray is also commonly issued to officers in order to provide them with a non-lethal alternative weapon with which to incapacitate violent suspects.

Riot police, when needs be, are provided with non-ballistic body armour, helmets and shields. Less-lethal weaponry is also used by riot-control units such as shotguns with rubber bullets, tear gas canisters or water cannons. Sometimes they also deploy LRAD units. The strict control of civilian firearms ownership in Poland, only recently liberalized, has significantly aided the police in keeping gun crime to a minimum, and thus the incidence of police firearms use is low.

=== Firearms ===
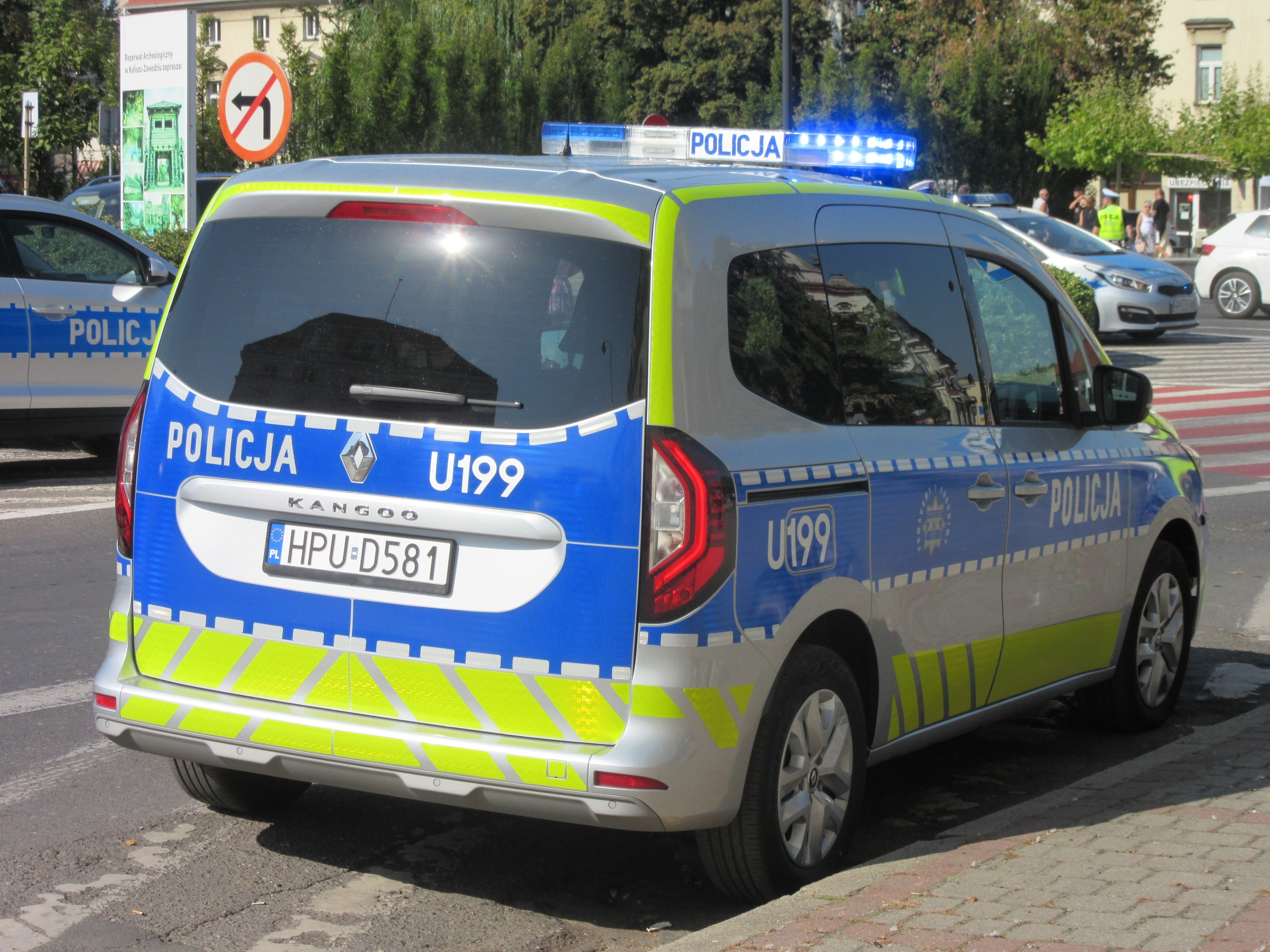
Renault Kangoo of the Greater Poland Command in Kalisz

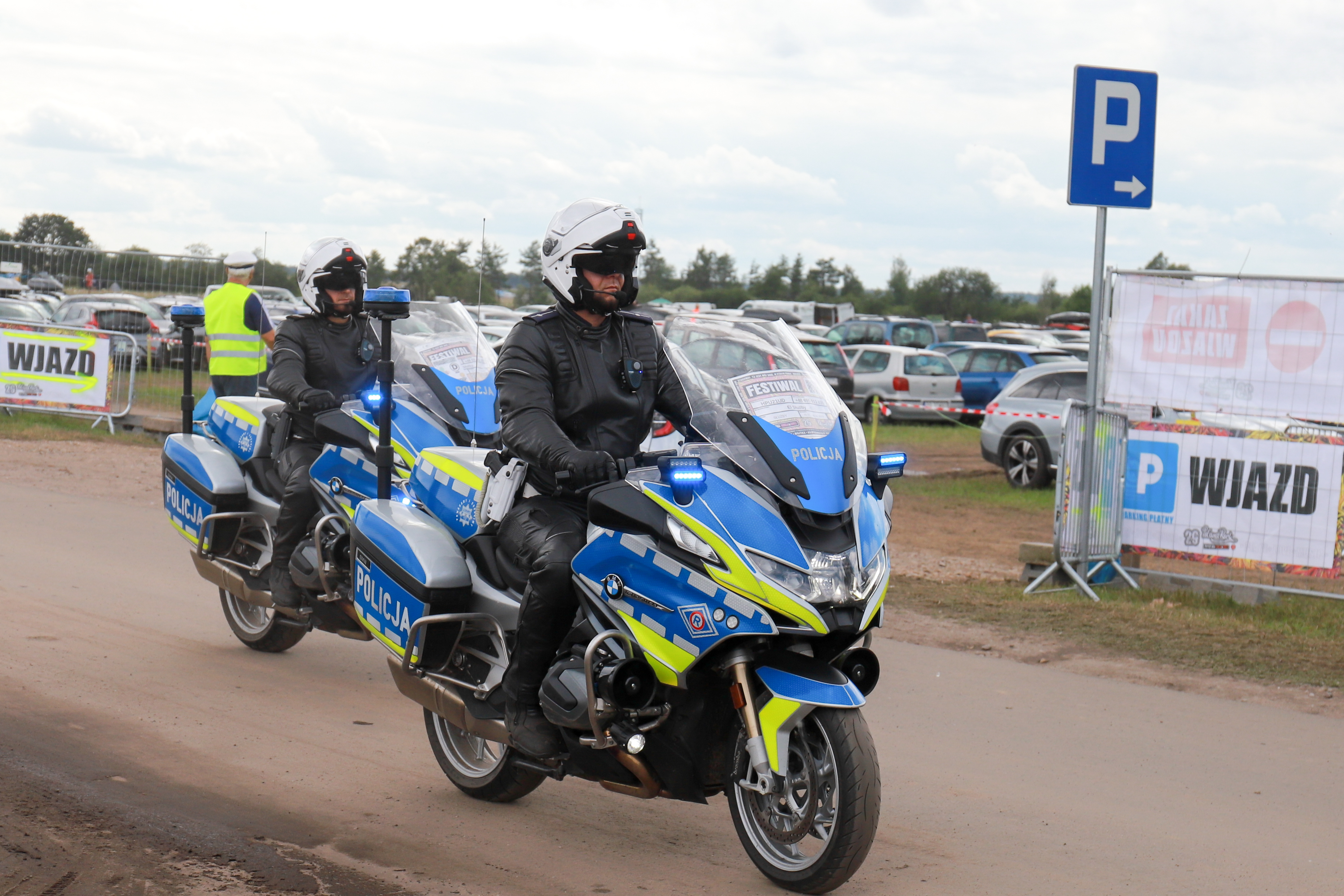
Police motorcyclists at the 2022 Pol'and'Rock Festival.

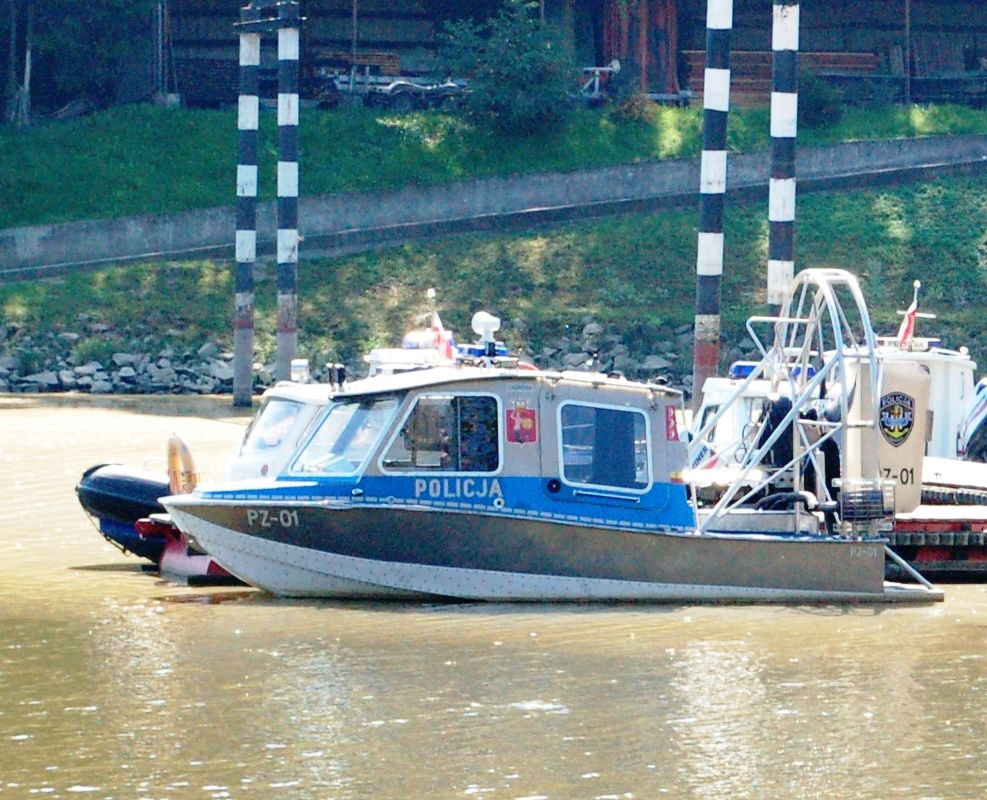
Policja patrol boats on the Vistula in Warsaw

Name	Country of origin	Type	Notes
Gward	Poland	Revolver	Virtually phased out
Walther P99 AS	Germany; Poland	Semi-automatic pistol	Manufactured in Poland in Łucznik Arms Factory under license
Glock	Austria	Semi-automatic pistol	17, 19 and 26 variants in use
CZ-75	Czechoslovakia; Czech Republic	Semi-automatic pistol	75, 75B and 85 variants in limited use
FB P-64	Poland	Semi-automatic pistol	Continued usage dubious
FB P-83 Wanad	Poland	Semi-automatic pistol	Continued usage dubious
Beretta APX	Italy	Semi-automatic pistol	
Arex Rex Zero 1CP	Slovenia; Poland	Semi-automatic pistol	Manufacturing shared between Arex in Šentjernej, Slovenia and Works 11 in Katowice, Poland
Taurus	Brazil	Semi-automatic pistol	Virtually phased out
FB Glauberyt	Poland	Submachine gun	PM-84 and PM-98 in use
Heckler & Koch MP5	Germany	Submachine gun	A3, A5, K-PDW and SD6 variants in limited use
Heckler & Koch UMP	Germany	Submachine gun	9mm variant, in limited use
IMI Uzi	Israel	Submachine gun	In limited use
FN P90	Belgium	Submachine gun	In limited use
PM-63 RAK	Poland	Submachine gun	Virtually phased out
MPT-76	Turkey	Battle rifle	
Mossberg 500	United States	Shotgun	
Hatsan Escort	Turkey	Shotgun	
Fabarm SDASS Tactical	Italy	Shotgun	Limited use of Short Imperator
Remington Model 870	United States	Shotgun	MCS variants in limited use
Bock IŻ 27	Russia	Shotgun	Limited use
Benelli M1	Italy	Shotgun	Limited use
Benelli M3	Italy	Shotgun	Limited use
Mossberg Model 695	United States	Shotgun	Limited use
Hunt Group Super-XS	Turkey	Shotgun	
AKM	Soviet Union; Poland	Assault rifle	AK, AKM and AKMS variants in use
Heckler & Koch G36	Germany	Assault rifle	C and K variants in use, standard issue for counter-terrorism units
Heckler & Koch HK416	Germany	Assault rifle	A5 variant in use, limited issue for counter-terrorism units
Haenel MK 556	Germany	Assault rifle	
Heckler & Koch HK417	Germany	Battle rifle	A2 variant in use, limited issue for counter-terrorism units
SVD rifle	Soviet Union; Poland	Designated marksman rifle	
Sako TRG	Finland	Designated marksman rifle	TRG-21, TRG-22 and TRG-42 variants in use
PK machine gun	Soviet Union; Poland	Machine gun	Used by officers assigned to the EULEX Intervention Group in Kosovo and by the BOA counter-terrorist unit following the 2003 Magdalenka gunfight; PKM, PKMN, PKMS, PKMSN variants in use
RWGŁ-3	Poland	Non-lethal rifle grenade launcher	
RWGŁ-1	Poland	Non-lethal rifle grenade launcher	
Brügger & Thomet GL-06	Switzerland	Grenade launcher	
Heckler & Koch HK69A1	Germany	Grenade launcher	
RGP-40	Poland	Grenade launcher	
Rheinmetall-NICO Sound and Flash Grenade	Germany	Stun grenade	
Centanex Distraction Grenade	United Kingdom	Stun grenade	1-bang and 6-bang models
Zeveta grenade	Czech Republic	Stun grenade (Both P1 and P2); Tear gas grenade (P2 only)	

=== Current patrol fleet ===
The below list is not intended to be a full list of all the vehicles used by the Polish Police, instead it lists the most commonly used vehicles.

==== Patrol cars ====
Image	Name	Country	Number	Note
Patrol cars
	Alfa Romeo 159	Italy	120	Marked
	BMW 320i	Germany	—N/a	Marked

As of 1 January 2018;

- Kia (Cee’d, Venga) - 5 732 vehicles
- Opel (Astra, Vectra, Corsa, Insignia, Mokka) – 2 785
- Škoda (Octavia, Fabia, Superb, Rapid) – 968
- Hyundai (i30, i20, Elantra) – 589

==== Vans ====
As of 1 January 2018;

- Fiat (Ducato) – 1 899 vehicles
- VW (Transporter, Crafter, Multivan, Caddy) – 596 vehicles
- Mercedes (Sprinter, Vito, Viano) – 637 vehicles
- Renault (Traffic, Master, Kangoo) – 506 vehicles
- Opel (Movano, Vivaro) – 236 vehicles

==== Buses ====
- Autosan
- Iveco

==== Motorcycles ====
- Yamaha FJR1300
- Honda CB250
- BMW K1200S
- BMW F800ST
- Triumph Tiger 1050
- Honda CBF1000A

==== Off-road vehicles ====
As of 1 January 2018;

- Nissan (Pathfinder, Terrano, Patrol, X-Trail, Navara) – 204 vehicles
- Kia (Sorento, Sportage) – 144 vehicles
- Land Rover (Defender, Freelander) – 89 vehicles
- Mitsubishi (L200, Pajero) – 126 vehicles
- Toyota (Hilux, Land Cruiser, Rav) – 48 vehicles

==== Aircraft ====
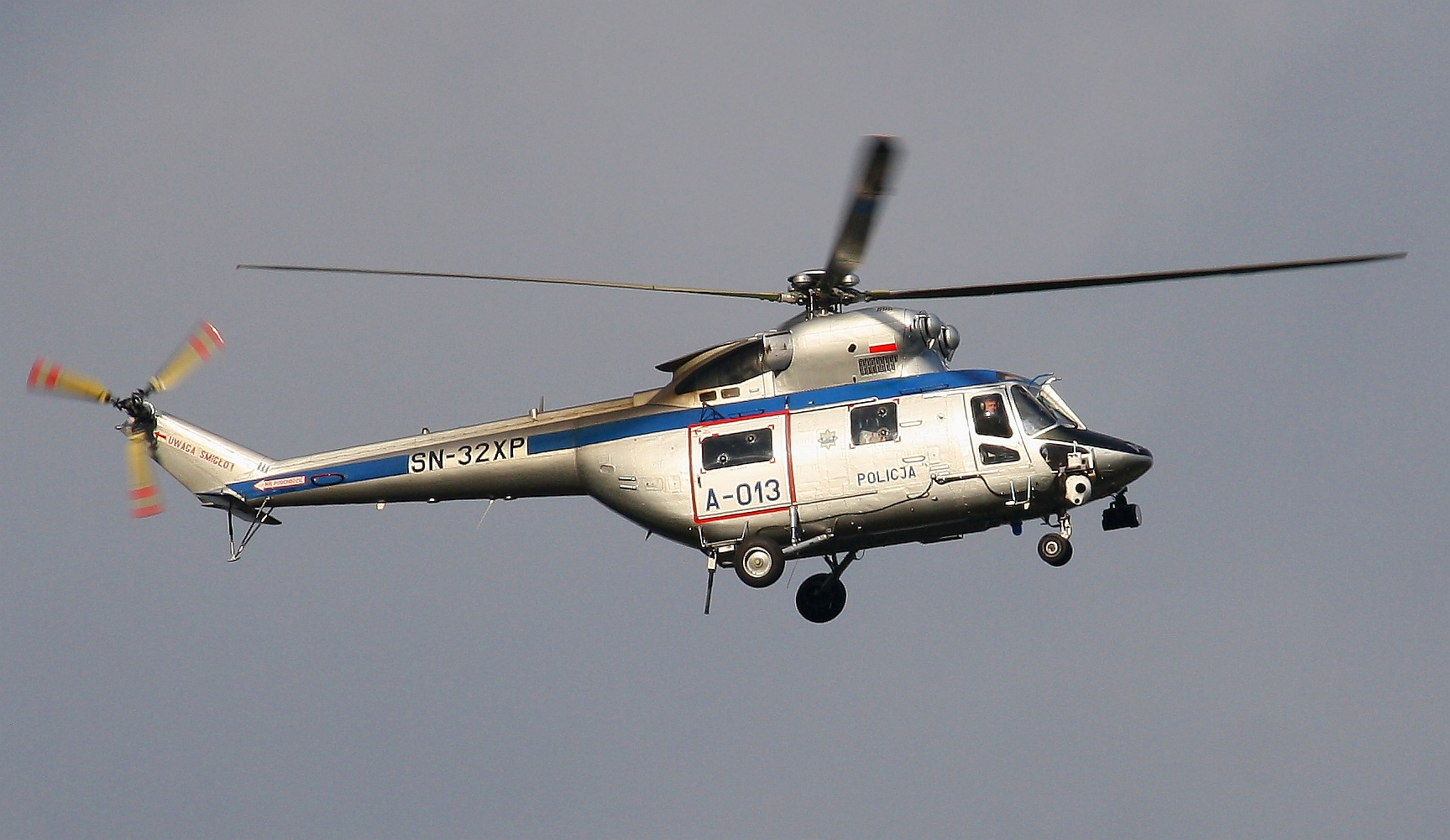
A PZL W-3 helicopter belonging to the Policja's Capital Command, based in Warsaw

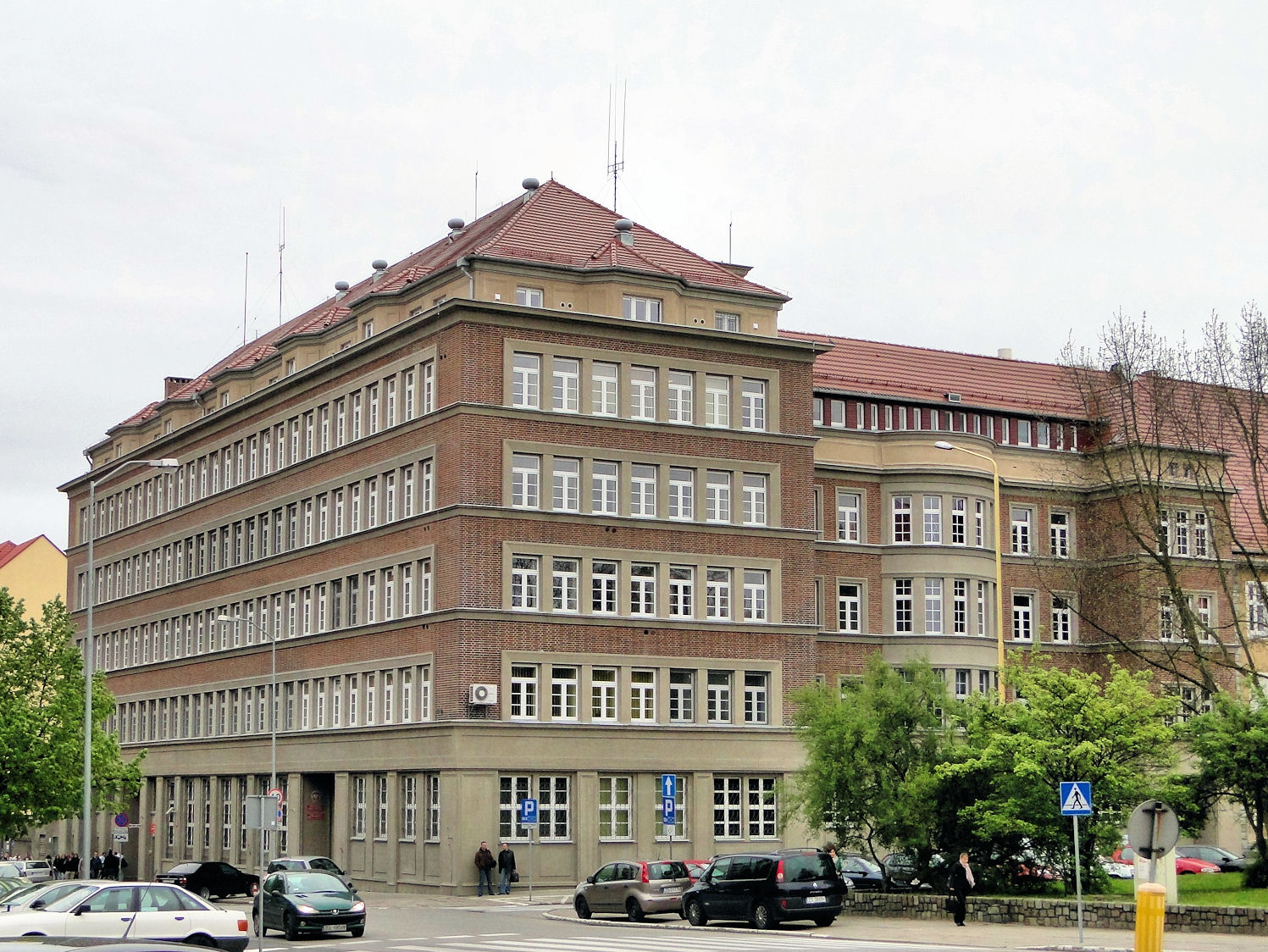
Police station, Szczecin

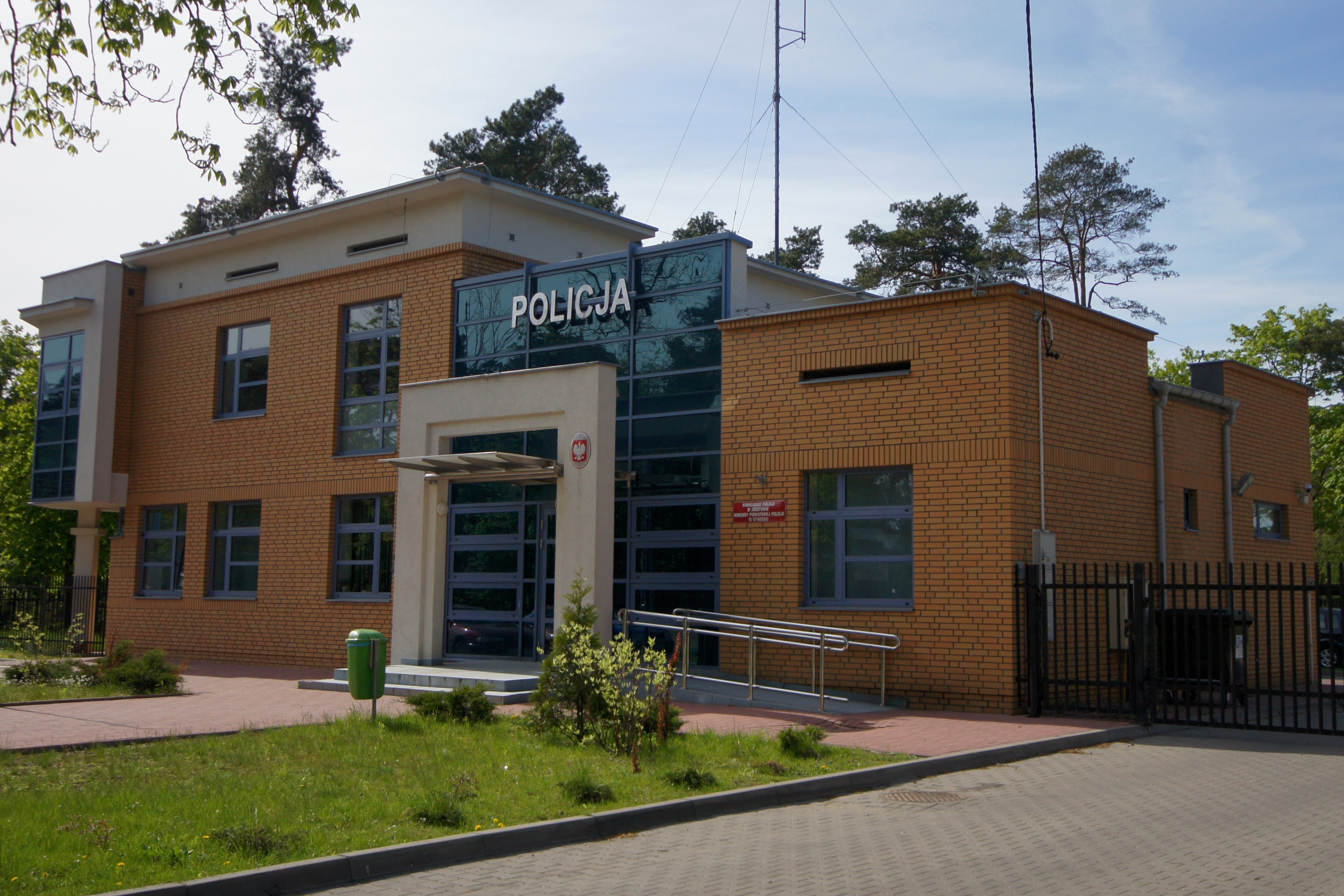
Police station in Józefów

The Policja currently has a total of 13 helicopters at its disposal, these are based in:

- Kraków - 1 x PZL W-3 Sokół
- Szczecin - 1 x PZL W-3 Sokół
- Warsaw - 2 x Mil Mi-8, 2 x Bell 407, 1 x Bell 412, 3 x Sikorsky UH-60 Black Hawk S-70i variant.
- Łódź - 1 x Bell 206
- Poznań - 1 x Bell 407
- Wrocław - 1 x Bell 206

In addition to the airborne and land-based patrol units of the Policja, many regional commands, and especially those based near the coast or through which major waterways flow, have maritime units. The largest of police maritime units are currently found on the Vistula river in Warsaw (under the command of the Capital Police) and the Warmian-Masurian Voivodeship where there is a large network of lakes and rivers. In coastal areas, maritime law enforcement cooperation also exists between the Policja and the Polish Border Guard.

- Polish Police aircraft fleet list on official website

== General commander of the Policja ==
The Policja's general commander is the senior-most officer of the Polish police. The rank of the general commander (usually General Inspector) is considered to be equivalent to that of a ranking general in the Polish military and both general inspektors and chief inspectors (who are also considered Police 'Generals') are entitled to wear embroidered white eagles, the state symbol, on their uniform lapels.

The commander’s apparatus is the National Police Headquarters based in Warsaw's Puławska Street. It is from here that the day-to-day administration and organisation of the Polish police's activities is coordinated. The headquarters is considered to have jurisdictional supremacy over all its other units, and subordinate commanders are responsible to the general commander in their capacity as his regional 'executives'.

The position has existed in a number of guises throughout the existence of the Polish police, and whilst the current office came into being following Poland's transformation into a liberal democracy in 1990, the same rank was also used for the highest-ranking officer of the State Police of the Second Republic during the inter-war years. Nowadays, holders of this office are considered to be successors to the commanders of the inter-war state police; commanding officers of the communist-era Milicja Obywatelska (Citizens' Militia) however, are not considered successors of the original cadre of Policja generals as they exercised authority over an organisation often utilised by the state as an instrument of political oppression.

Since 1990 there have been twelve general commanders of the Policja who have completed their service. General Inspector Marek Papała, the former holder of the office, was assassinated by a person or persons unknown on 25 June 1998. He was shot in the head with a silenced weapon whilst exiting his car near his home in Warsaw's southern Mokotów district. The commander's murder remains unsolved and is considered to be one of the most significant outstanding cases under active investigation by the Polish police.

== Rank structure ==
=== Officers ===
Rank group	General / flag officers		Senior officers			Junior officers
	Generals		Senior officers			Junior officers
Policja
Policja	Generalny inspektor Policji	Nadinspektor	Inspektor	Młodszy inspektor	Podinspektor	Nadkomisarz	Komisarz	Podkomisarz
Policja	Inspector general of police	Chief inspector	Inspector	Junior inspector	Deputy inspector	Chief commissioner	Commissioner	Deputy commissioner

=== Other ranks ===
Rank group	Senior NCOs							Junior NCOs	Enlisted
	Aspirants				Non-commissioned officers				Constables
Policja
Policja	Aspirant sztabowy	Starszy aspirant	Aspirant	Młodszy aspirant	Sierżant sztabowy	Starszy sierżant	Sierżant		Starszy posterunkowy	Posterunkowy
Policja	Staff aspirant	Senior aspirant	Aspirant	Junior aspirant	Staff sergeant	Senior sergeant	Sergeant		Senior constable	Constable

== Structure and branches of the Policja ==
The Policja is currently divided into a number of different services. Each voivodeship/municipal (district) command has subdivisions within its force. This leaves the police service with a large number of specialised branches which can more specifically target certain types of crime and apply more expert knowledge in the investigation of cases relating to their area of policing. In addition to these specific groups, all police forces retain a majority of officers for the purpose of patrol duty and general law enforcement.

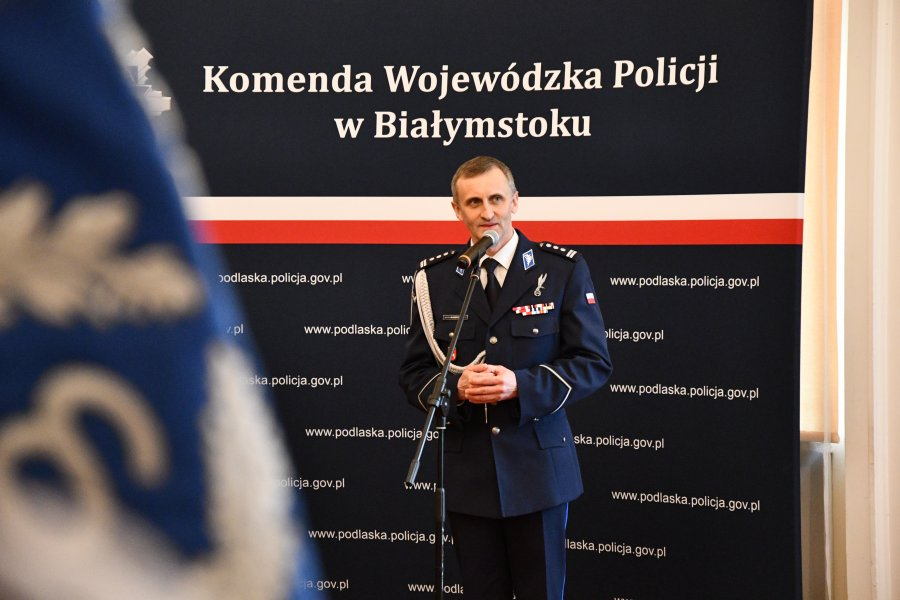
Commander of the Podlachian Voivodship Policja in the new dark-blue uniform in tradition of the pre World War II Policja Państwowa

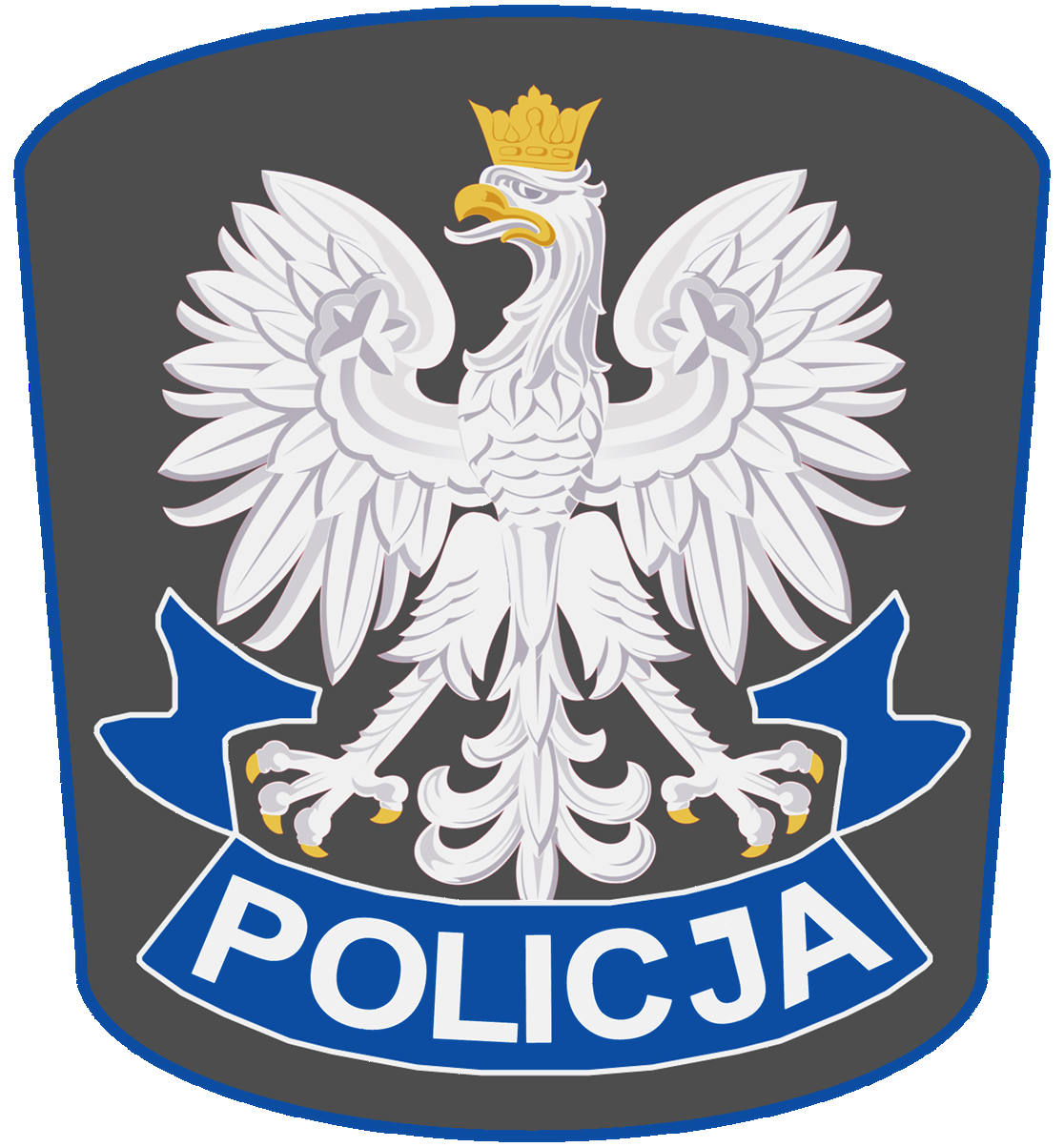
The cap badge of the Policja is common to all ranks and branches.

Typically a constituent force of the Policja will contain the following subdivisions within its structure:

- Criminal Police (Policja Kryminalna) - investigation and prevention of crime
  - The criminal police may include specialised teams such as anti-drugs and financial crime prevention units
  - All forces have crime scene and forensics units
- Preventative Police (Policja Prewencyjna) - general law enforcement operations and patrol duty (includes riot police divisions)
- Counter-terrorism Police (Policja Kontrterrorystyczna) - special and high risk operations
- Traffic Police (Policja Ruchu Drogowego) - road safety, traffic marshalling and highway patrol/pursuit
- Logistical Support Police (Policja Wspomagająca) - provision of logistical support and technical skills
- Police Aviation Service (Służba Lotnictwa Policji) - aviation support (not present in every force)
- Investigative Police (Policja Śledcza) - investigation of complex cases and process of referral to the state prosecutor's office
- Judicial Police (Policja Sądowa) - protection of court and state prosecutor's office premises, judges, prosecutors, victims and suspects, execution of court orders
- Maritime Police (Policja Wodna) - maritime patrol and pursuit

Service uniform sleeve insignia for uniformed officers
Branch	Criminal	Preventative	Traffic	Logistical Support	Special and Riot Branch	Judicial
Insignia						

== Anti-terrorism units (BOA/SPKP) ==
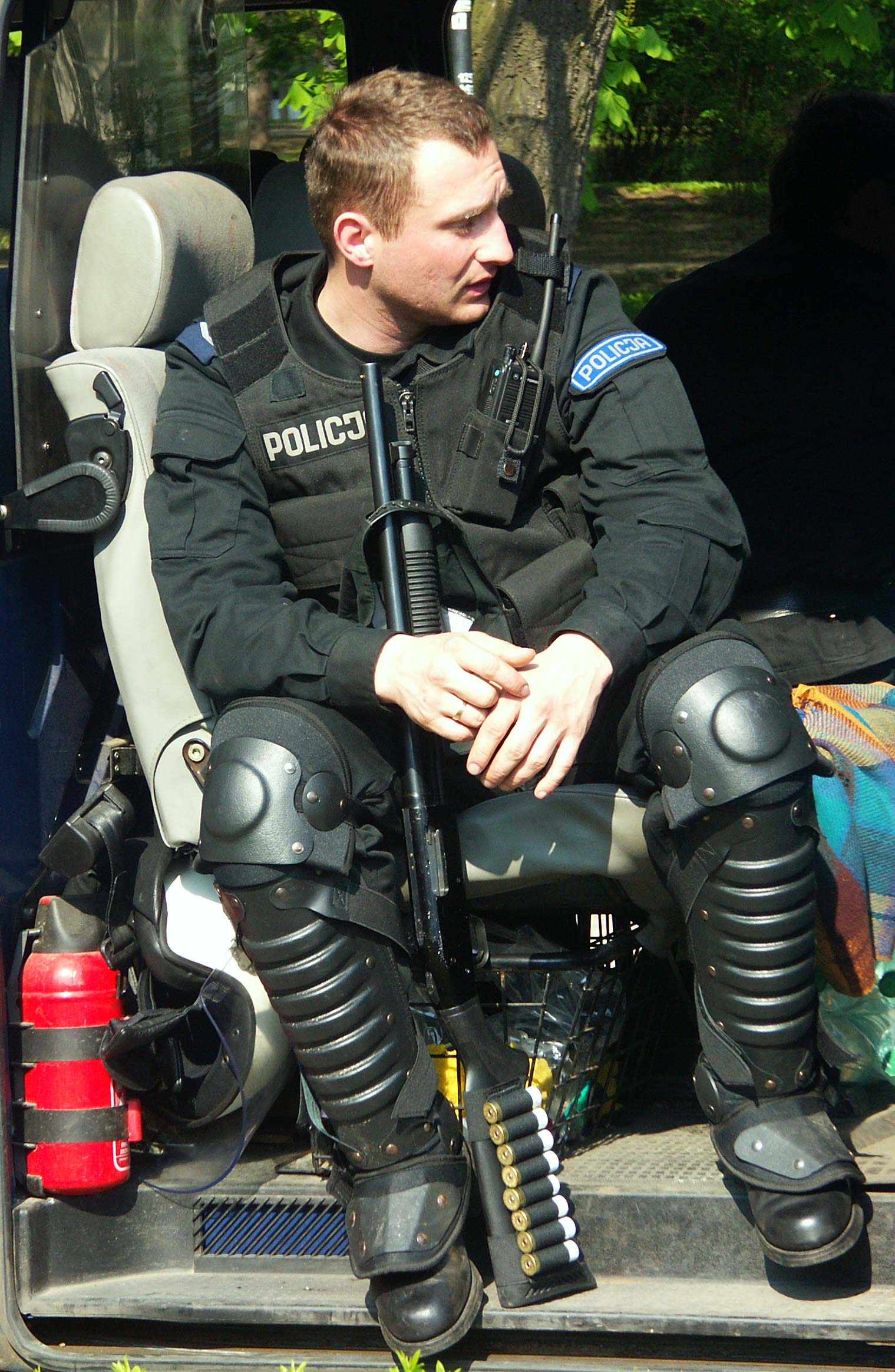
A riot police officer of the Preventative Police

The Policja has highly qualified and well-equipped counter-terrorism formations. The central (national-level) anti-terrorism is BOA KGP (Central Counter-terrorism Police Subunit, previously Biuro Operacji Antyterrorystycznych, Bureau of Anti-terrorism Operations), which is part of the Komenda Główna Policji (Policja Headquarters). On a regional level, voivodeship commands have control of smaller units called SPAP (Samodzielny Pododdział Kontrterrorystyczny Policji), Independent Counter-terrorism Policja Subunit), these units are responsible for, high-risk arrests, search warrant execution service, hostage rescue operations (only in alarm situations; BOA has priority in this task) and other similar tasks.

Because of their training and skill level, members of the BOA and SPKP units cooperate with similar special police formations from the Czech Republic, Slovakia, Germany and other ATLAS members. They also, train with servicemen from Służba Ochrony Państwa, Straż Graniczna, Agencja Bezpieczeństwa Wewnętrznego, Wojska Specjalne, and most recently with the U.S. Army and 10th CAB's premier special missions company, A/3-10 GSAB WarAngels.

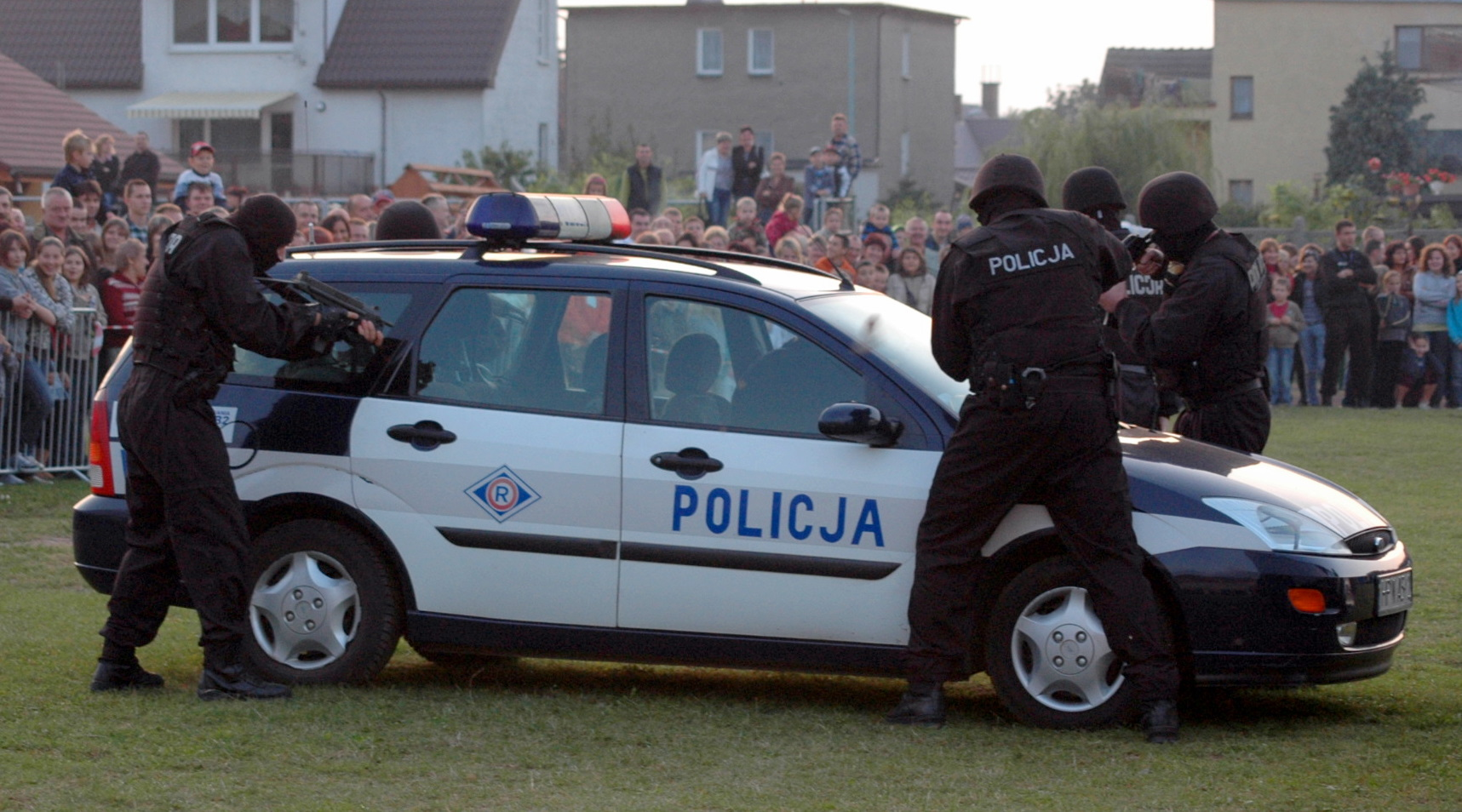
Anti-terrorism officers of the Policja demonstrate their tactics at a Policja exhibition in Wolin.

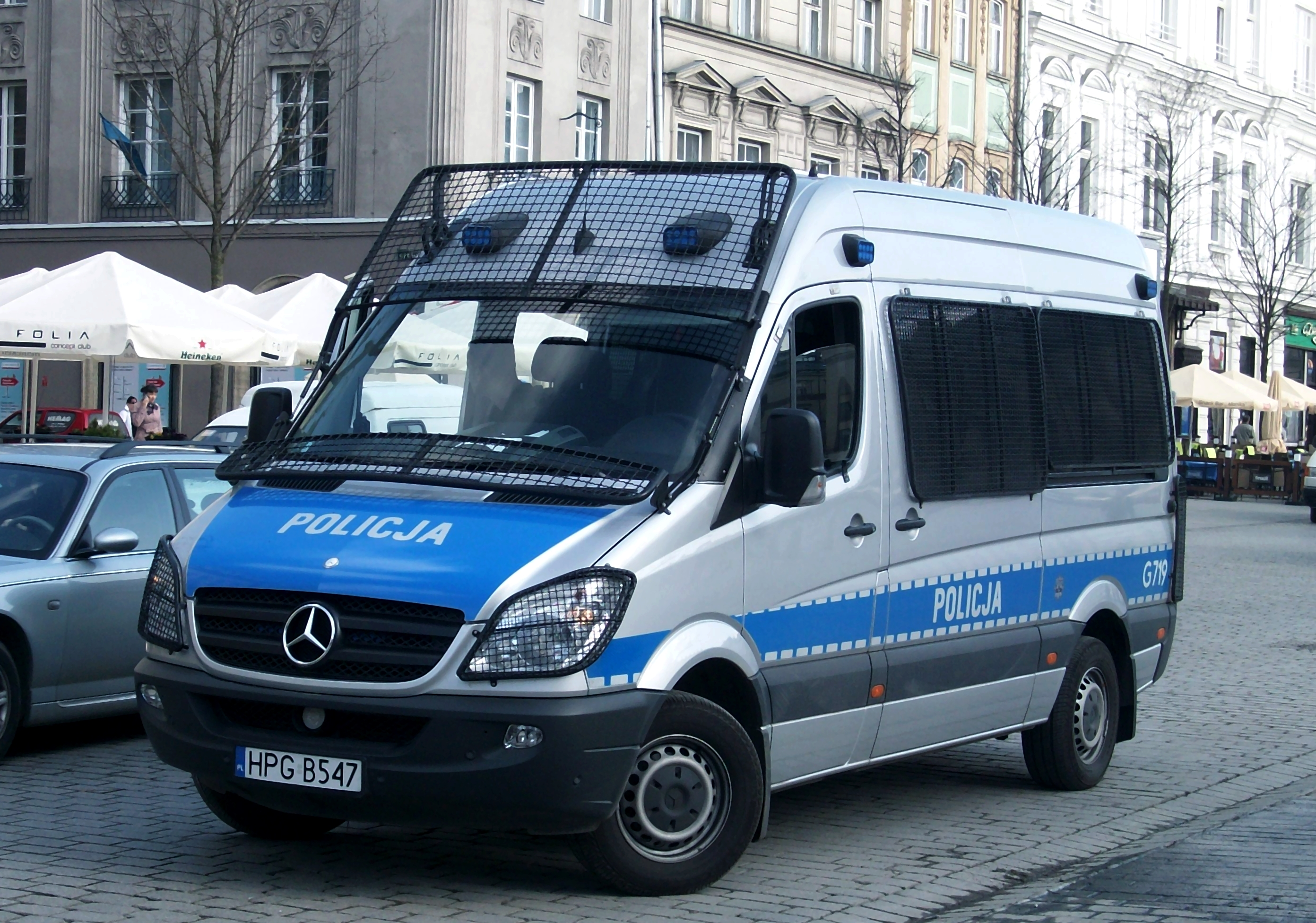
A Mercedes-Benz Sprinter of the Policja in Kraków

SPKP uniform badge

== Peacekeeping and international cooperation ==
Since the Policja's foundation in its current form in 1990, the service has taken part and continues to participate in a number of international peacekeeping and international police missions around the world. To date the Policja has sent officers to participate in the following international peacekeeping missions:

- United Nations Mission in Liberia (UNMIL) - 3 officers
- European Union Police Mission in Bosnia and Herzegovina (EUPM) - initially 12 officers (2003), later reduced to 3 senior advisers (2009)
- European Union Police Mission in Afghanistan (EUPOL Afghanistan) - 3 officers and 2 senior advisers
- European Union Monitoring Mission in Georgia (EUMM) - 10 officers (working alongside 16 officers of the Żandarmeria Wojskowa)
- European Union Rule of Law Mission in Kosovo (EULEX) - 8 senior advisers

In addition to participating in international missions, the Policja also send delegates to and cooperate with international law enforcement agencies and organisations such as Europol and Interpol. Currently the Polish officers make up the eighth largest staff contingent of Europol; a figure which is expected to rise as the Polish police force becomes more integrated with, and more active within, the organisation. Europol has also become far more important to Poland's policing community in recent years since Poland, in 2007, became a signatory of the Schengen Agreement, allowing for greater European integration, uninterrupted travel, and cross-border police cooperation. To this end, Polish cooperation with the German, Czech, Slovak and Lithuanian police services has reached an all-time high. Furthermore, the Policja officers have taken part in a number of foreign police officer training and exchange programs, such as Project Lifesaver, which has seen a number of officers sent to the UK to observe and discuss alternative methods of policing abroad.

As a constituent member of Interpol, the Polish police is expected to adhere to the terms of International arrest warrants and cooperate with the police forces of other nations through formal diplomatic channels. In many cases such cooperation has led to the arrest of high-risk criminals.

== Organisation ==
The Polish Police is a centralised police force, organised under one central command in Warsaw and with all officers assigned to one of 17 voivodeship/municipal operations' commands, except in the case that they are specialists working independently for the national commandant.

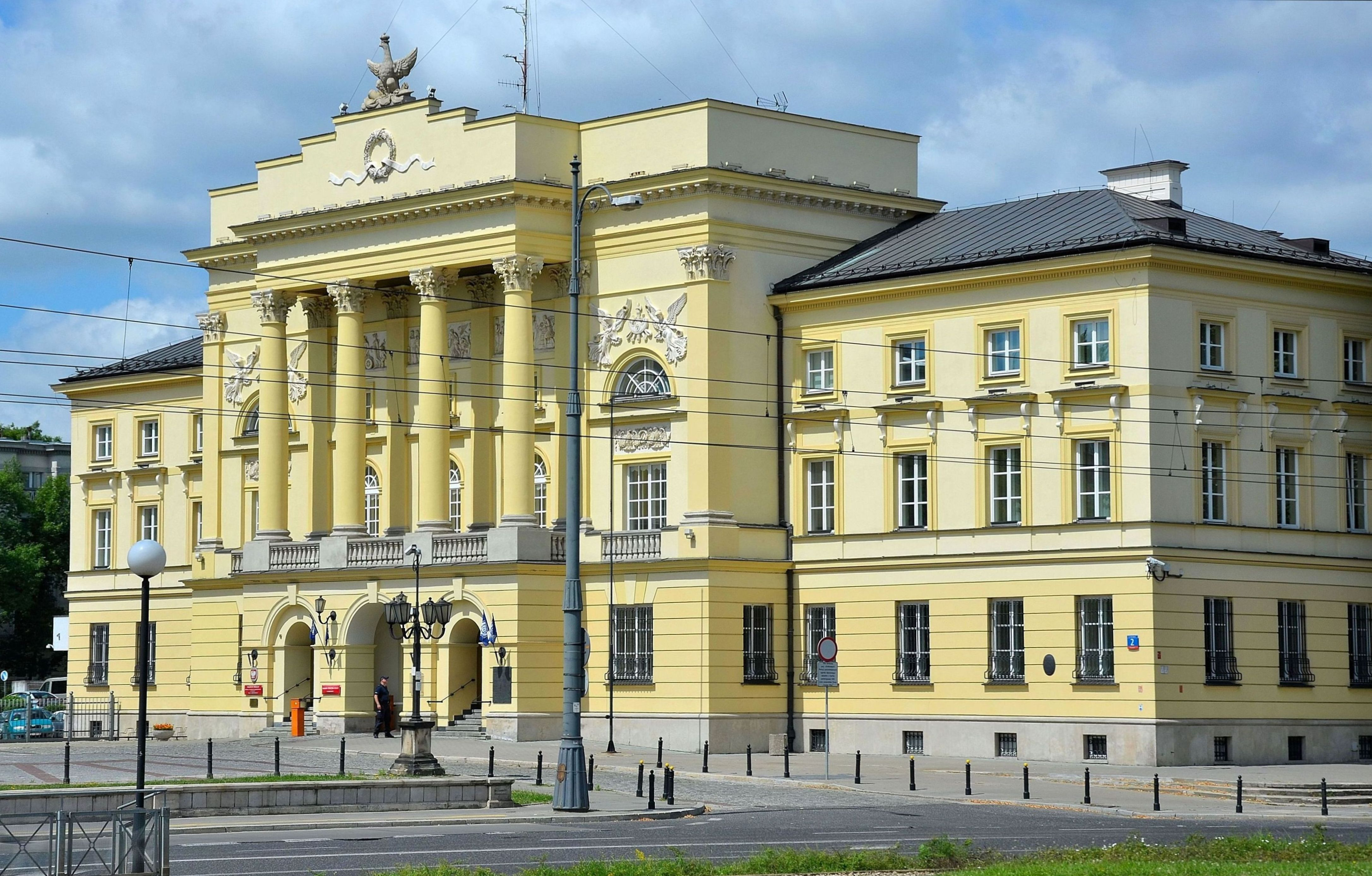
The Mostowski Palace in Warsaw, headquarters of the Capital Police Command

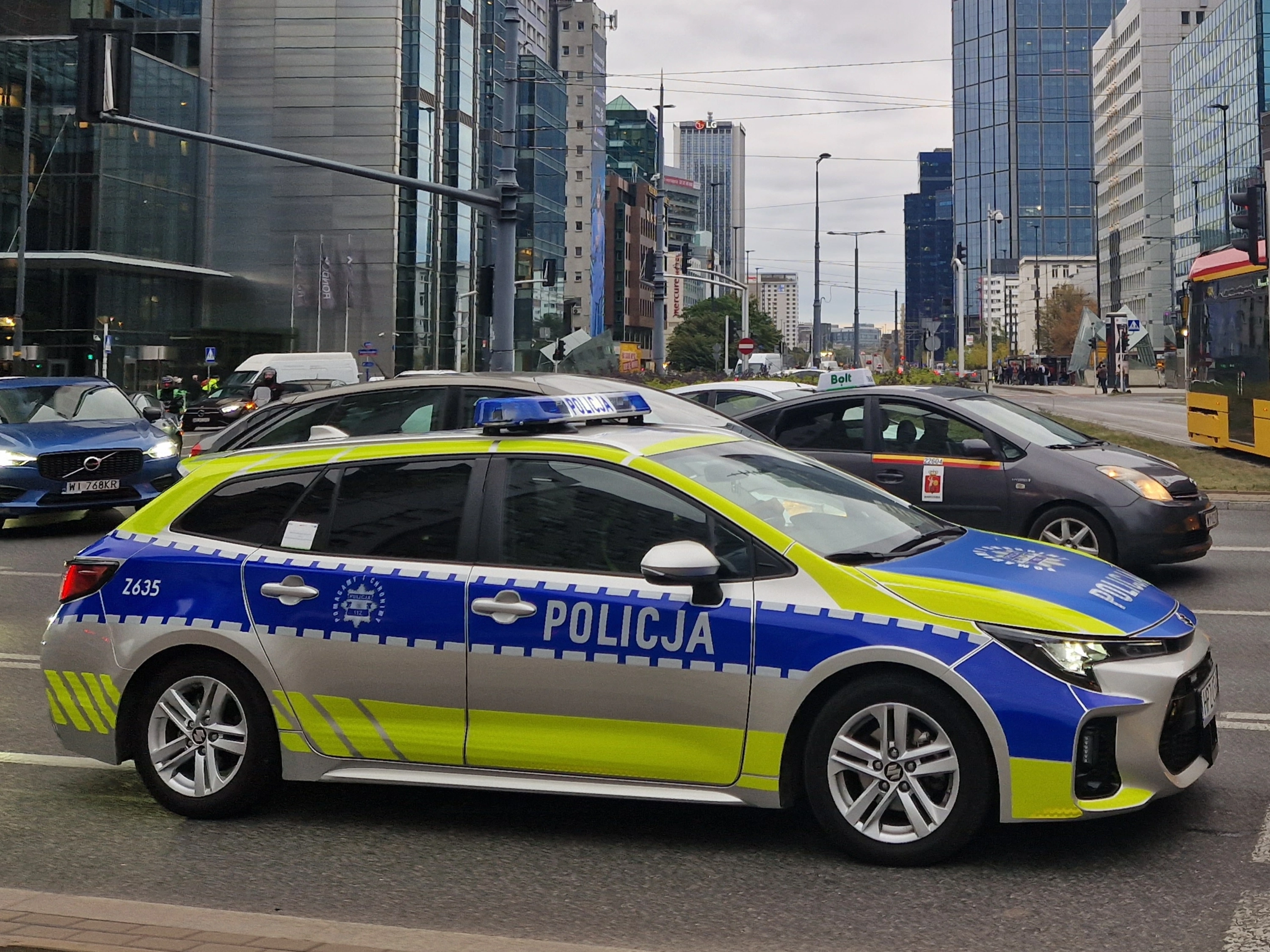
A police vehicle in central Warsaw.

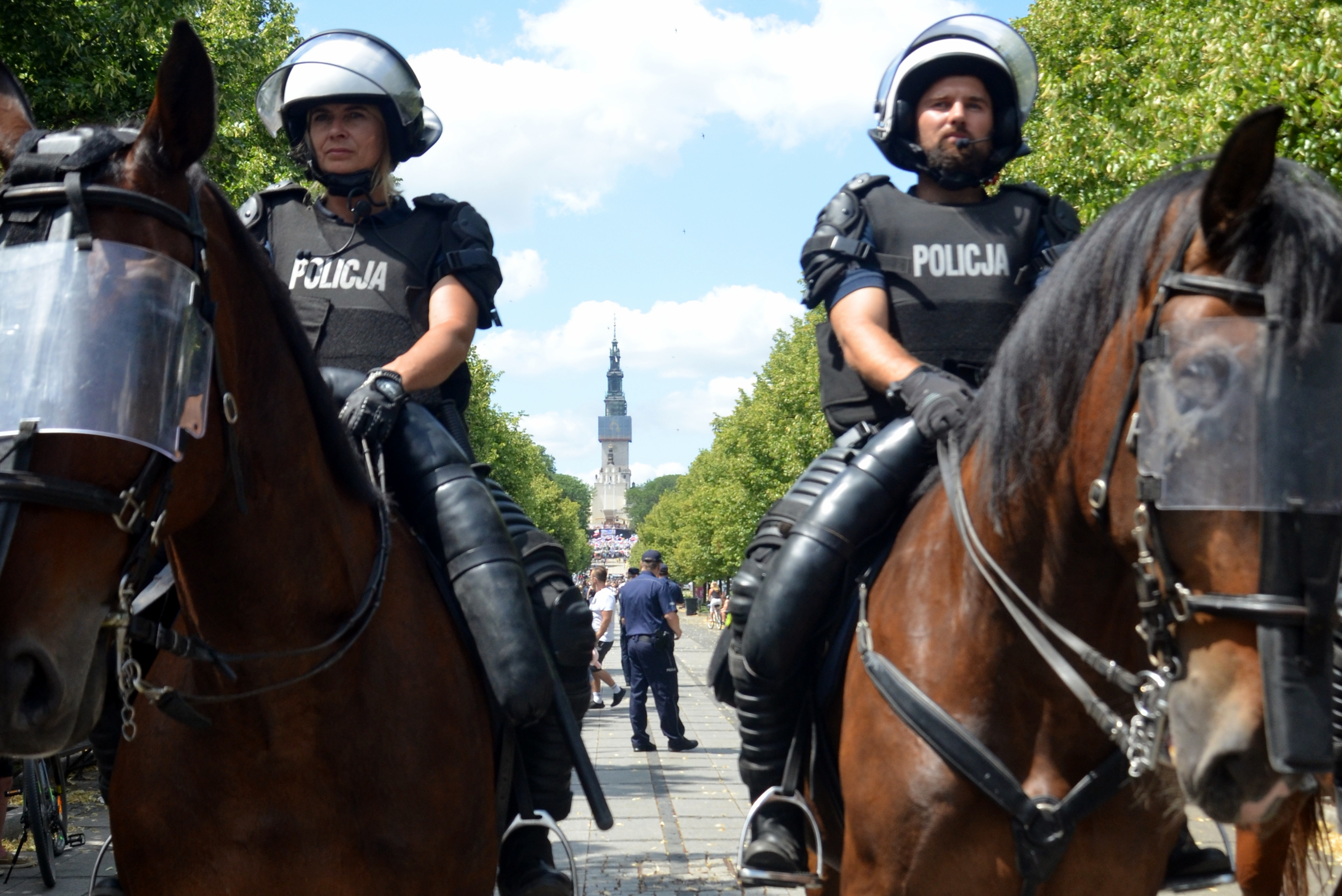
Mounted police officers in riot gear.

=== Regional headquarters ===
Territorial Force		Seat
Voivodeship (or its part)	Unit	Seat
Greater Poland	Greater Poland Voivodeship Headquarters	Poznań
Kuyavian-Pomeranian	Kuyavian-Pomeranian Voivodeship Headquarters	Bydgoszcz
Lesser Poland	Lesser Poland Voivodeship Headquarters	Kraków
Łódź	Łódź Voivodeship Headquarters	Łódź
Lower Silesian	Lower Silesian Voivodeship Headquarters	Wrocław
Lublin	Lublin Voivodeship Headquarters	Lublin
Lubusz	Lubusz Voivodeship Headquarters	Gorzów Wielkopolski
Masovian (Warsaw metro)	Capital Metropolitan Police Headquarters	Warsaw
Masovian (peripheral remainder)	Voivodeship Headquarters in Radom	Radom
Opole	Opole Voivodeship Headquarters	Opole
Podlaskie	Podlaskie Voivodeship Headquarters	Białystok
Pomeranian	Pomeranian Voivodeship Headquarters	Gdańsk
Silesian	Silesian Voivodeship Headquarters	Katowice
Subcarpathian	Subcarpathian Voivodeship Headquarters	Rzeszów
Świętokrzyskie	Świętokrzyskie Voivodeship Headquarters	Kielce
Warmian-Masurian	Warmian-Masurian Voivodeship Headquarters	Olsztyn
West Pomeranian	West Pomeranian Voivodeship Headquarters	Szczecin

=== Police training establishments ===
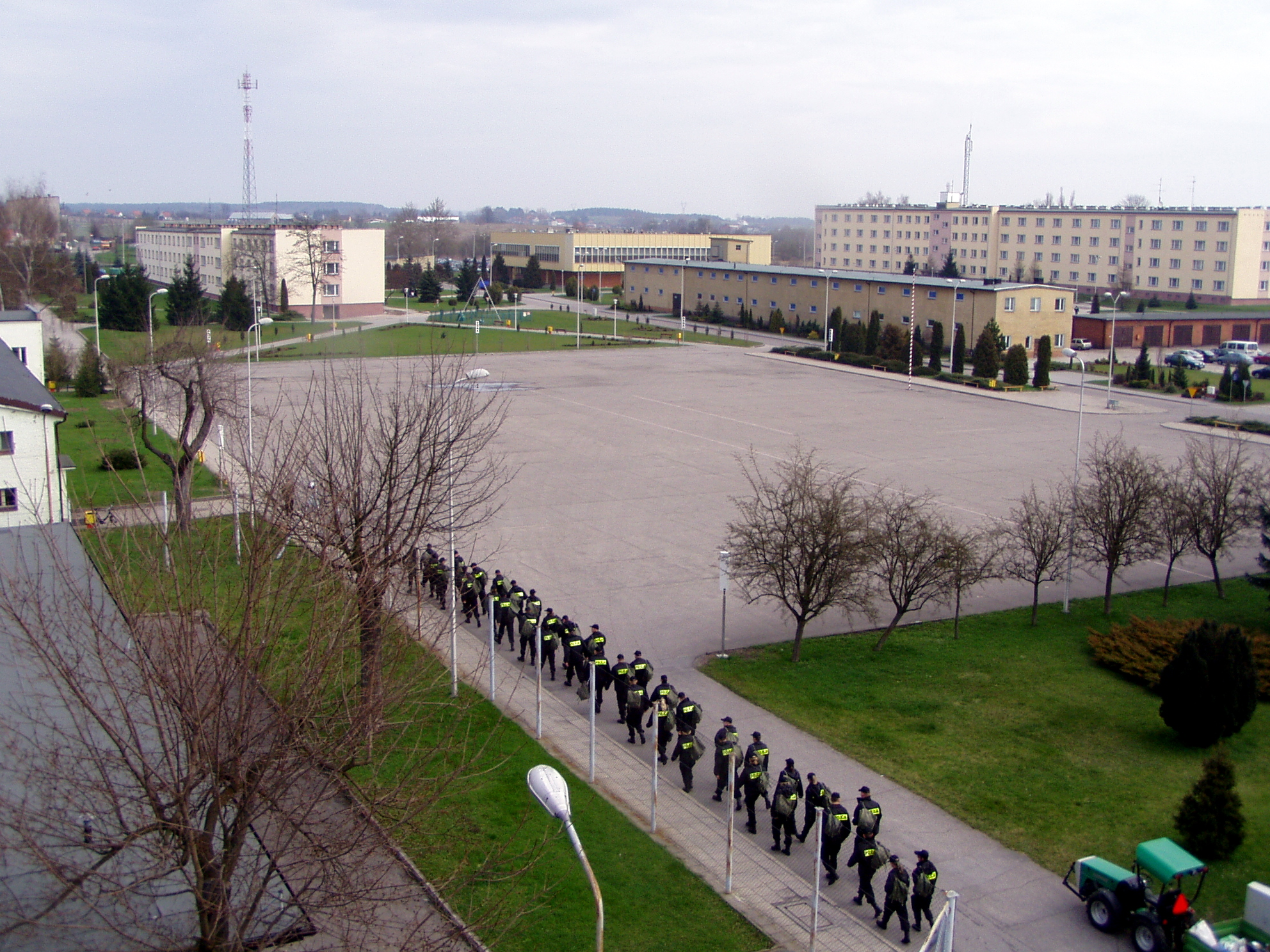
Officer candidates arrive at the Polish Police Academy in Szczytno

The Policja has five training establishments sited within Poland. Four of these training establishments are police schools for enlisted personnel, whilst the fifth is a higher educational institution tasked with the education of officers and senior officials in a range of disciplines and expertises. The four junior colleges are located in:

- Piła, Greater Poland Voivodeship - Piła Police School (Szkoła Policji w Pile)
- Słupsk, Pomeranian Voivodeship - Słupsk Police School (Szkoła Policji w Słupsku)
- Katowice, Silesian Voivodeship - Katowice Police School (Szkoła Policji w Katowicach)
- Legionowo, Masovian Voivodeship - Police Training Centre (Centrum Szkolenia Policji)

The final police training establishment in Poland is the Akademia Policji or Police Academy in Szczytno (Warmian-Masurian Voivodeship). This school was founded in 1954 as the officer academy of the Milicja Obywatelska, renamed in 1972 to the Higher Militia School, the college finally became the Higher Police School upon Poland's return to liberal democracy in 1990. Since then it has remained the only establishment in the country certified to run courses for commissioned officers of the Polish police, and the officer's commissioning course. All students who attend the Higher Police School are expected to study criminal, constitutional and economic law. In addition to academic studies, officer candidates are trained in modern policing techniques, weapons' handling, and informatics. The college has numerous links with senior police academies in Europe and throughout the wider world.

=== Ceremonial units ===
==== Representative Honour Guard Company of the Police ====
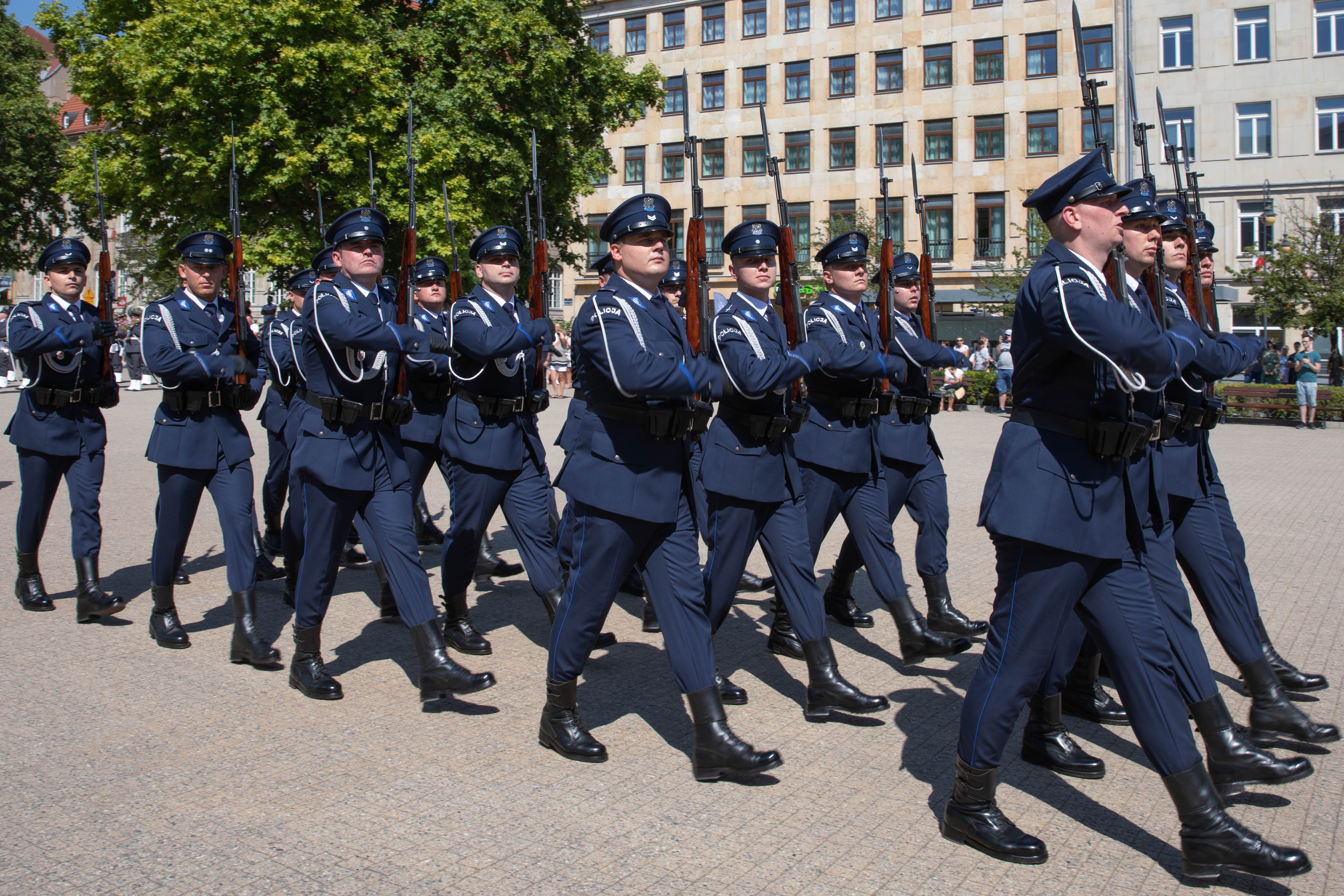
The Representative Honour Guard.

The Representative Honor Guard Company (Polish: Kompania reprezentacyjna Policja) is the ceremonial drill unit of the police. Affiliated with the Representative Honor Guard Regiment of the Polish Armed Forces, it performs public duties and drill and ceremony on behalf of the police force and the President of Poland. In regards to national events, it mainly performs during the annual National Independence Day ceremony in November alongside other honor units on Piłsudski Square.

==== Representative Band of the Policja ====
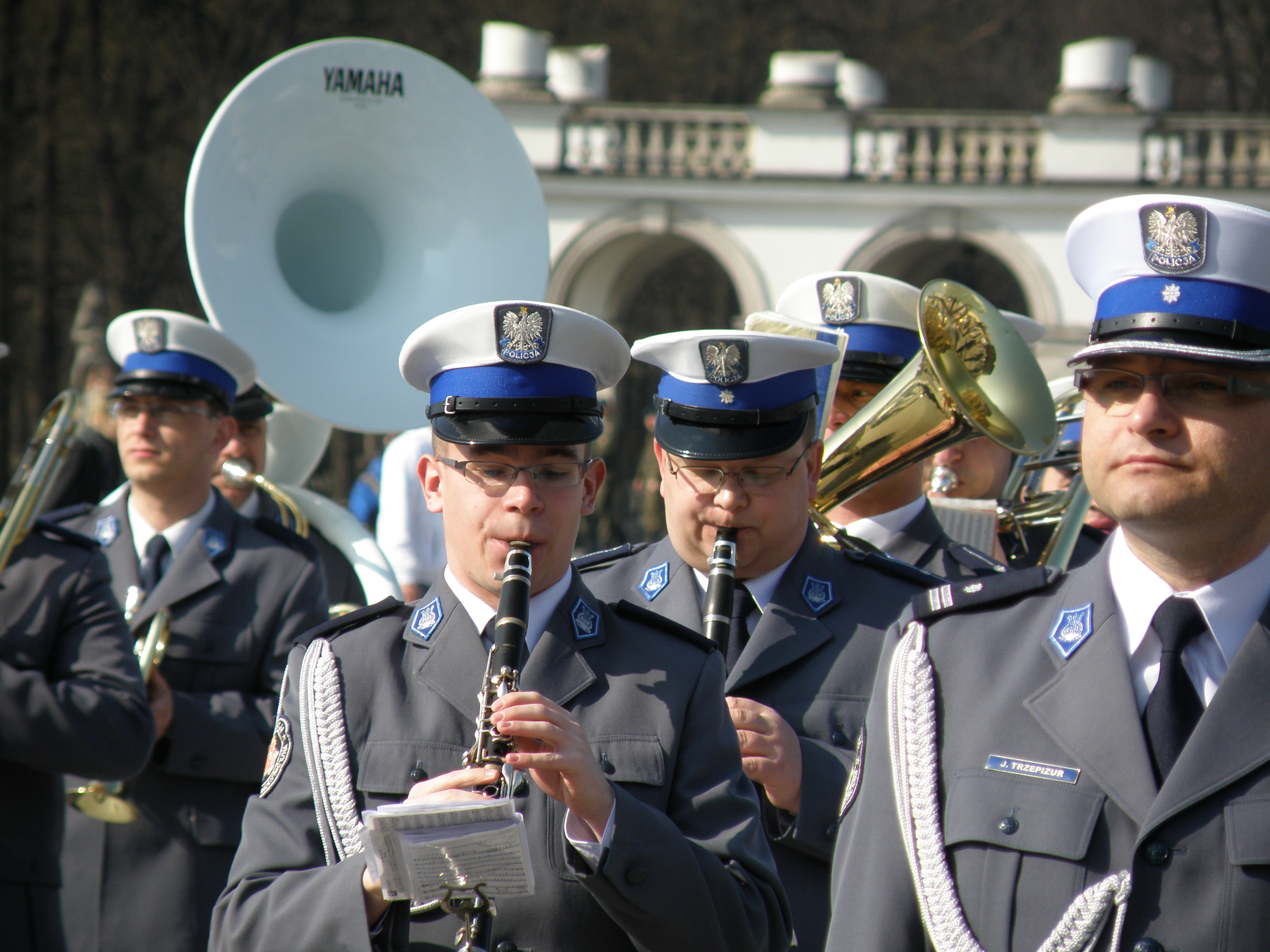
A group of musicians from the official Representative Band of the Policja

The Policja's representative band was first founded in 1968. Its core was composed of a group of several musicians, which gradually expanded. From the beginning, the band improved rapidly, reaching a high artistic level, as reflected in the discretion of the judges at musical contests nationwide. In the years 1984, 1986, 1988, the band won its most prestigious trophy, the Cup of the Minister of Internal Affairs. From the outset, the musicians performed at various national, departmental, religious and state events. The band's musicians have on numerous occasions represented the Polish police outside the country, including concerts in Denmark, Belgium, Czech Republic, Belarus and Russia, yet they still value their well-kept tradition of playing performances for the ordinary residents of Warsaw. The band's musical repertoire includes marches, concert pieces, transcriptions of orchestral music and religious songs, as well as a great deal of other developmental music. Being the official representative band of the Policja, the group's musicians are often invited to play parade music for important events on national holidays such as the 3rd May Constitution Day.

== Criticism of the Policja ==
Overall the level of trust in the Policja and its work has increased steadily over the years since 2001. In 2001 only 46% of respondents to a national survey carried out on behalf of the police categorised their work and achievements as 'good', however, by the end of 2009 this figure had grown significantly, and despite small undulations, an average of 72% rated the Policja's work as 'good' or better. This brings the level of trust in the police to around the same level of 64-75% seen in other member states of the European Union.

Much in the same way as other national police forces, the Policja is sometimes criticised for the methods it employs in maintaining law and order, such criticism is typically voiced by Polish youth. This is most commonly expressed with the acronyms (C)HWDP and JP.

== Gallery ==
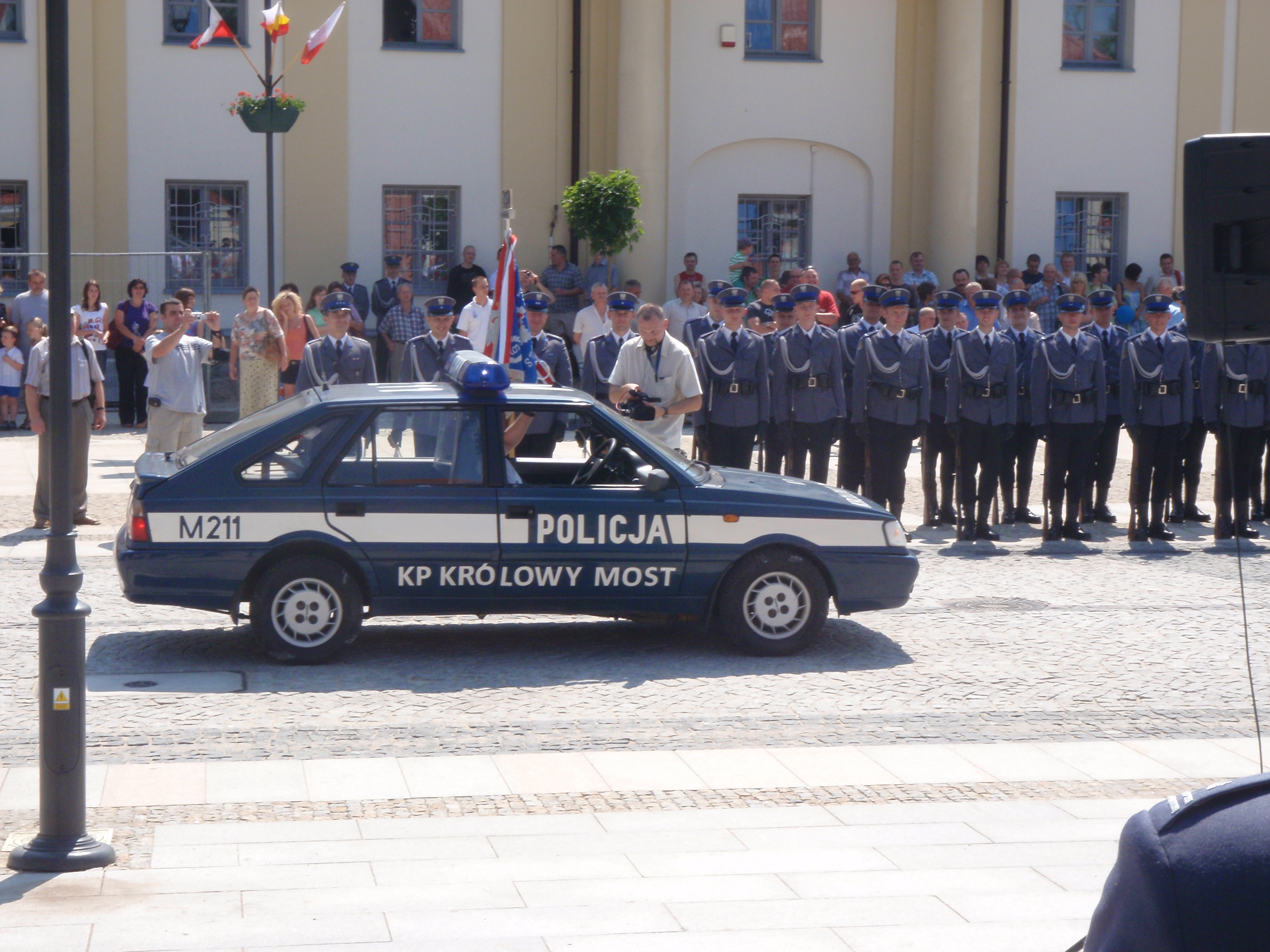
Old, out of use, patrol car (FSO Polonez) in previous markings

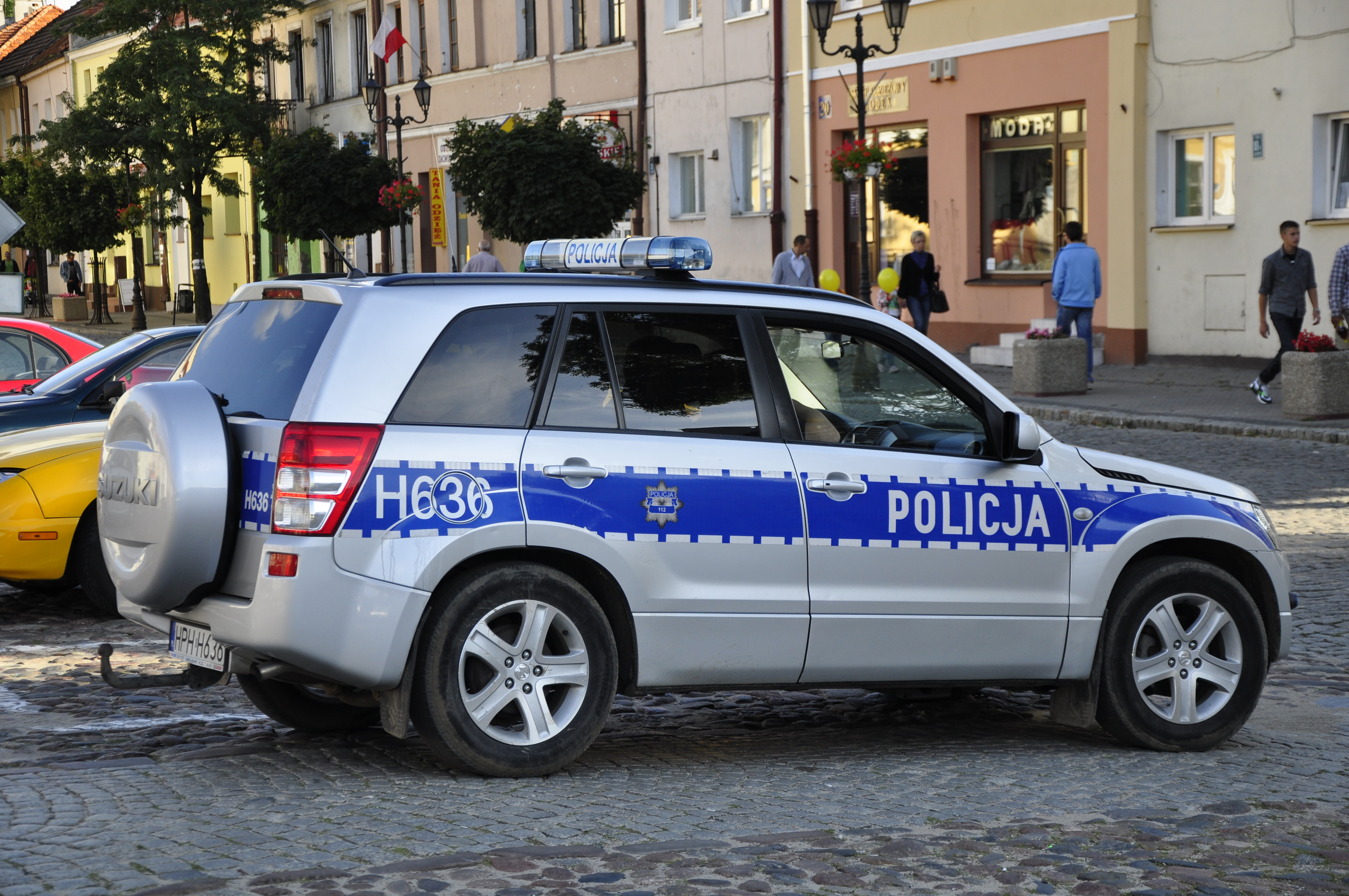
A new all-terrain vehicle, Suzuki Vitara, in new colour scheme

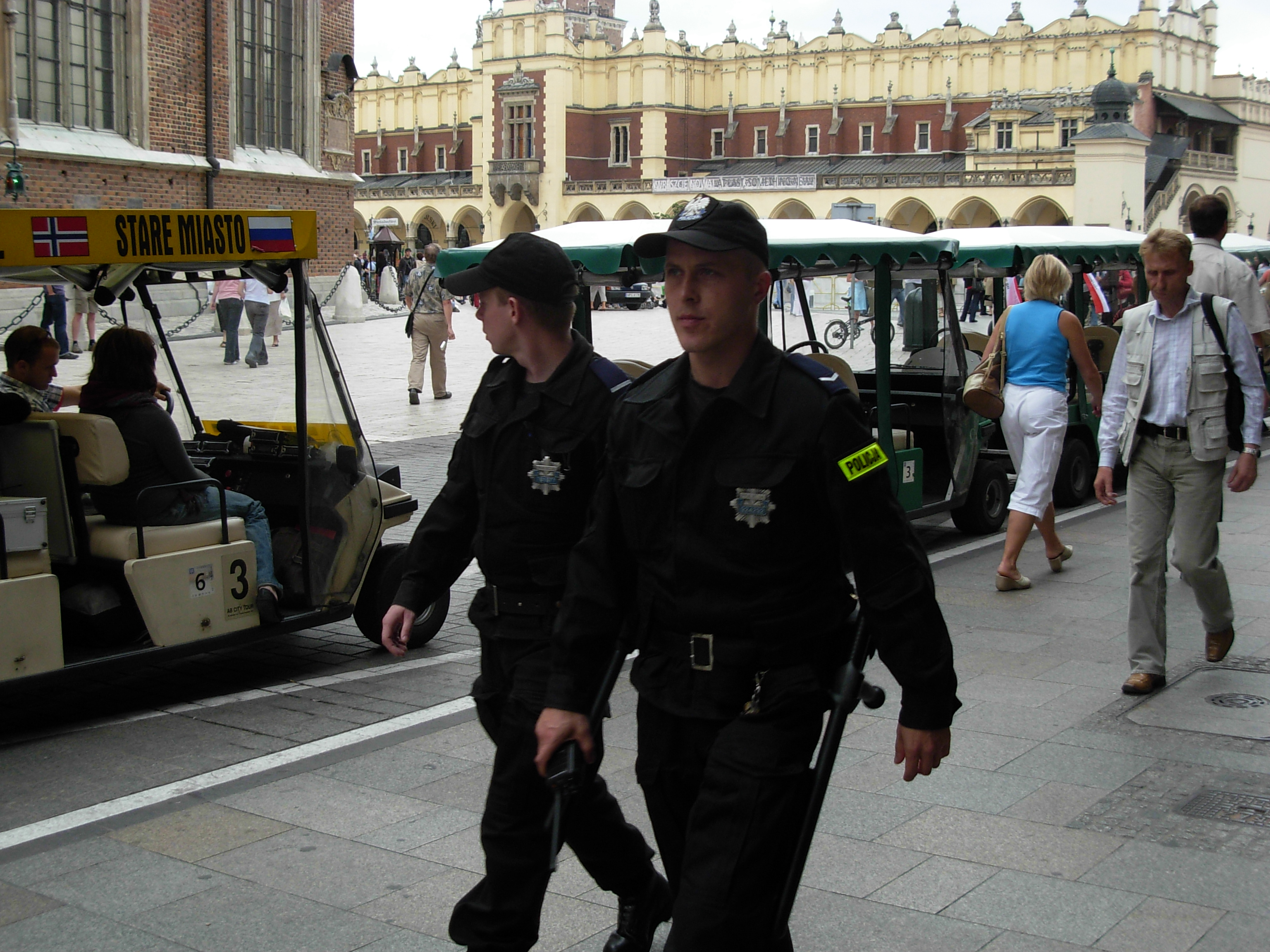
Two policemen (old patrol uniform) patrol Kraków's Old Market Square

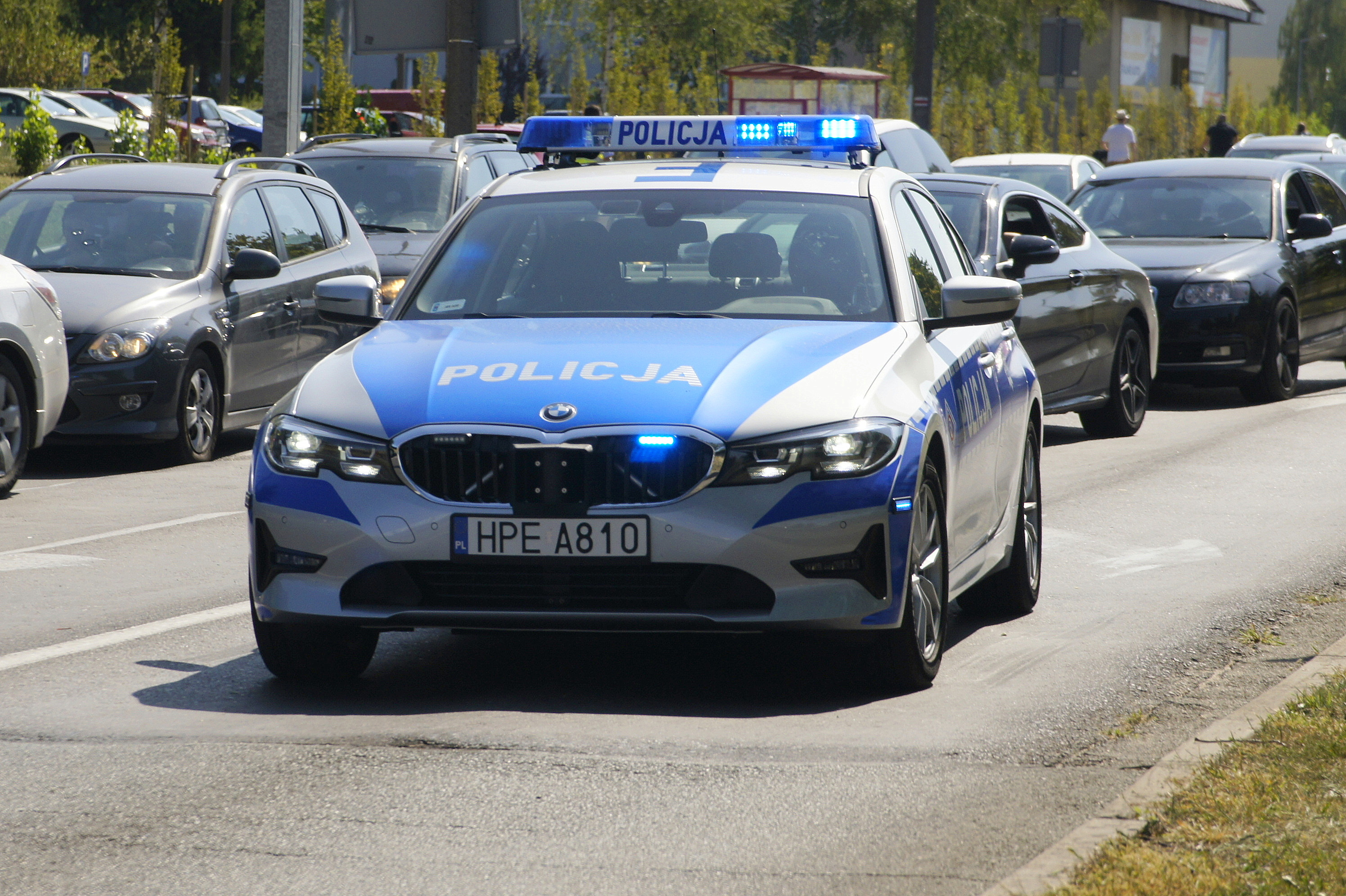
BMW 3 Series squad car of the Policja

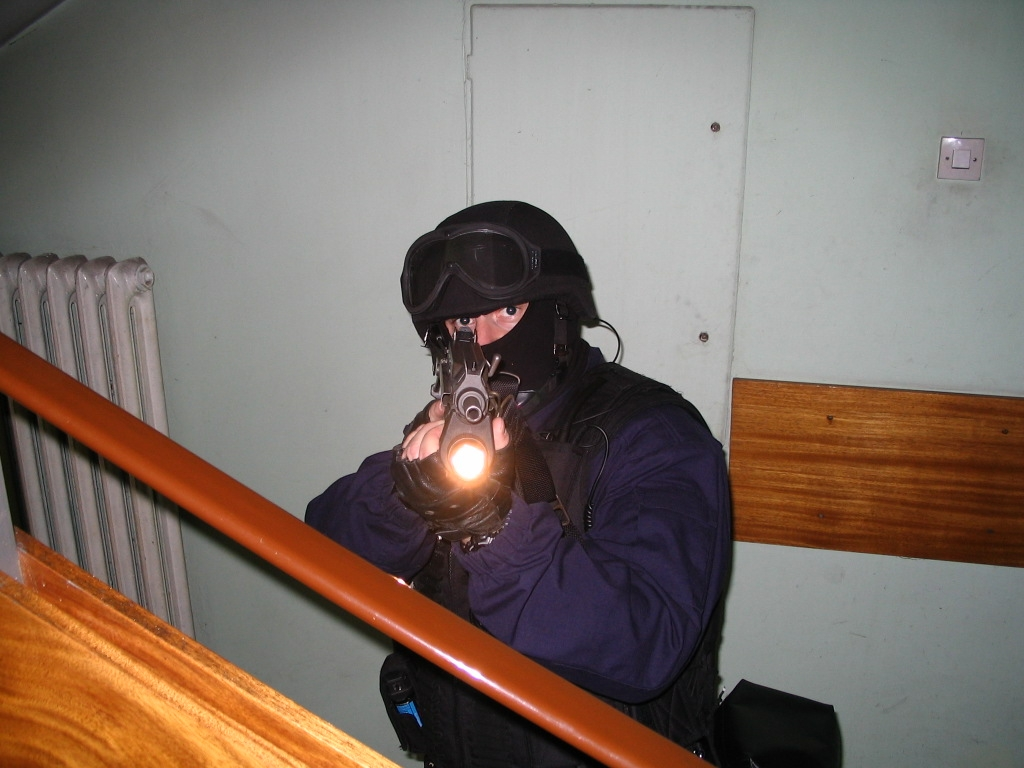
An anti-terrorism Policja officer from SPAP (Special Branch) during training

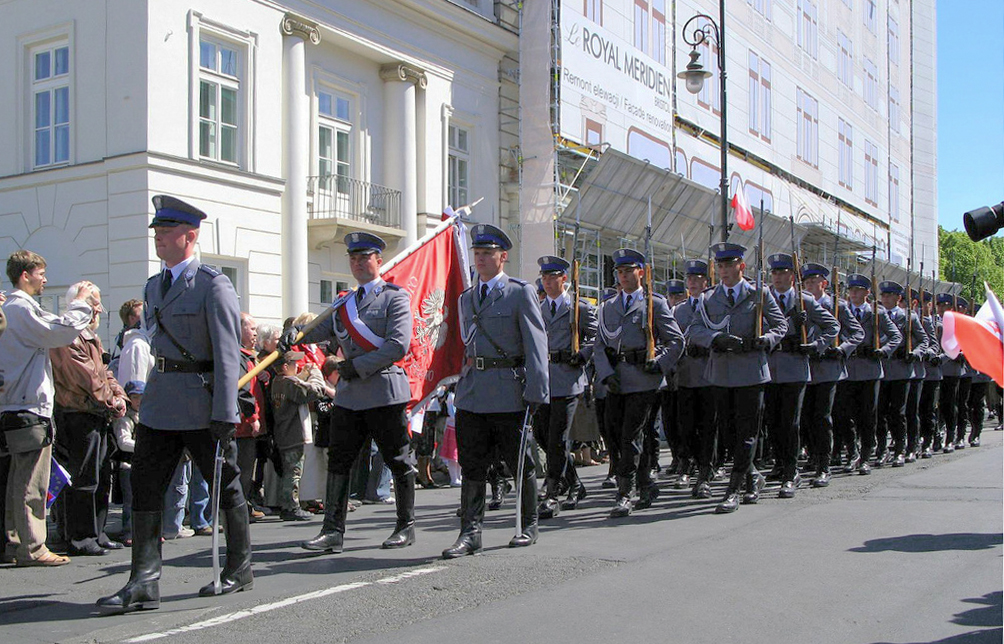
Policja officers marching in parade uniform on 3 May Constitution Day

== See also ==
- Milicja Obywatelska (MO) - communist era police/militia service
- Ministry of the Interior and Administration
- Służba Bezpieczeństwa (SB) - communist era secret police service
