= RWGŁ-3 =

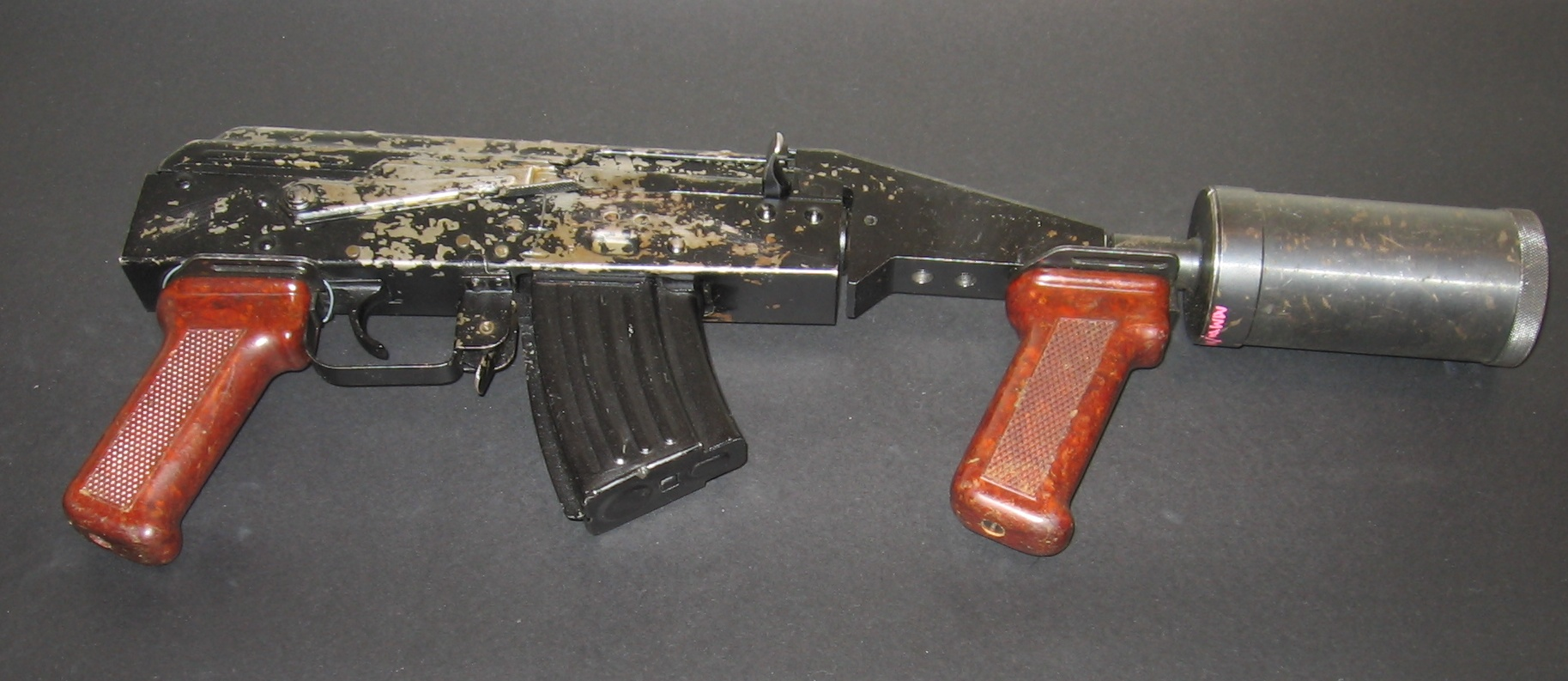
- The RWGŁ-3 launcher
- Type: Non-lethal weapon
- Place of origin: Polish People's Republic

Service history
- In service: 1978–present
- Used by: Polish police

Production history
- Designed: 1970s
- Manufacturer: Zakłady Metalowe "Łucznik"

Specifications
- Mass: 3.1 kg (6.83 lb)
- Length: 517 mm (20.4 in)
- Width: 75 mm (3.0 in)
- Height: 182 mm (7.2 in)
- Cartridge: 7.62×39mm
- Action: Gas operated
- Maximum firing range: 100 m
- Feed system: Muzzle-loaded, single-shot
- Sights: None

The RWGŁ-3 (Polish: Ręczna Wyrzutnia Granatów Łzawiących 3) is a non-lethal police rifle grenade launcher used to dispense tear gas, developed in the 1970s by a group of engineers from the Polish state-owned research institute OBR Radom with the purpose to quell protests against the communist government. In order to cut production costs, it was designed around AKM assault rifle components. After several years' worth operational use of expensive RWGŁ-1 and failed RWGŁ-2 development project, in 1978 it became a standard-issue grenade launcher of Milicja Obywatelska and is still in use by the current Policja.

Its regular ammunition is Polish UGŁ-200 canister with affecting mucous membranes CN gas, however usage of the East German RWK grenade was possible too.

In 1984, its capabilities were enhanced by the SZO-84 adapter, effectively converting it into a netgun.

Based on the RWGŁ-3, a heavier automatic grenade launcher called "AWGŁ-3" was developed to be mounted on UAZ-469 and STAR trucks.
