= Koszalin escape room fire =

2019 fire in Koszalin, Poland

- Date: 4 January 2019
- Time: 17:15 (UTC+01:00)
- Location: Koszalin, Poland; 54°11′50″N 16°12′30″E
- Cause: Leaking gas cylinders used for heating stove
- Deaths: 5
- Injuries: 1

A fire in the ToNiePokój (Note: Pronounced [ˈtɔ ˈɲɛ ˈpɔ.kuj], literally 'this is not a room'.) escape room in Koszalin, Poland, on 4 January 2019, killed five teenage customers and injured an adult employee. The deceased, all 15-year-old girls, were celebrating one of the girls' birthdays when a fire, fueled by leaking gas cylinders, broke out in the escape room's waiting area. Since the girls were in a room with no door handle (they were expected to find it as part of a game) and the windows were obstructed by "makeshift walls", they were trapped and died of carbon monoxide poisoning.

Previous visitors to the escape room had complained of a strong gas smell, but local officials were not made aware of the complaints. The duty employee who was to supervise the girls, Radosław D., had left the building to get change for the cashier and was gone when the fire started. Upon his return, he attempted to enter the victims' room, but was blocked by a wall of flames, and was severely burnt and later hospitalised.

Four people were arrested and tried for their responsibility in the fire, including Radosław, who was sentenced to two years in prison. The court also awarded 200,000zł compensation to each victim's family. Because of the fire, Poland implemented new regulations for entertainment venues, requiring them to undergo inspections by fire officials at least every two years. The regulations also required ample evacuation routes.

== Background ==
The ToNiePokój escape room was registered with the Polish government in 2018, and offered four escape room choices: Darkness, Party, Workshop, and Crime at a cost of 249zł (USD 64.85 in 2019) for two hours. The escape room was advertised as a place to "spend your birthday creatively". Darkness, which the victims chose, was "no bigger than a closet", measuring approximately 7 m^{2} (75 sq ft). Candles, makeshift equipment, two armchairs, and a lamp were the accoutrements inside Darkness. The story line was that the uncle of one of the players had secluded himself in his house for years. To leave the house, the players must discover his secret.

According to The New York Times, the building's windows had been covered with "makeshift walls". The room's door had no handle, since the victims were supposed to find it as part of the game. There was no panic button to open the door in an emergency. Previous visitors had found the escape room to be in poor condition, complaining about a strong gas smell and "makeshift" electrical wiring. Jarosław Szymczyk, Commander-in-Chief of Police, stated that local officials were not made aware of these complaints.

== Fire ==
At approximately 5:15 p.m. on 4 January 2019, a fire broke out in one of the two compartments of the escape room at 88 Marshal Józef Piłsudski Street. Five 15-year-old girls – Amelia Wieczorek, Małgorzata "Gosia" Tymieniecka, Julia Pawlak, Karolina Barabas, and Wiktoria Pietras – died of carbon monoxide poisoning. They were students of class III D at Junior Gymnasium No. 9 (currently Primary School No. 18) in Koszalin and were close friends, celebrating Pawlak's birthday. At the time of their deaths, they were in a room called Darkness at the back of the building and were not directly burned by the fire. The official investigation found the fire began in the waiting room of the building and was fueled by leaking gas cylinders attached to a heating stove.

The gas cylinder finding has been disputed by the victims' parents, who claimed the fire was caused by a live fire such as a burning candle or "a cigarette left on the couch by an employee". According to the parents, an experiment with a gas cylinder demonstrated a completely different damage pattern to the stove's casing than what was reported in the official investigation files. The employee on duty, Radosław D., was not present when the fire started, since he was in a nearby store to change money, and a wall of flames prevented him from opening the room when he returned. According to the prosecutor's office, Radosław did not attempt to extinguish the fire, use extinguishers, or call emergency services. According to the prosecutor, if Radosław had been present, he could have revealed a hidden passage behind a false fireplace leading the victims to a fire-free adjacent room.

The girls called the fire department and told the dispatcher that they were trapped, that there was a large volume of smoke, and that they needed help. At about 5:30 p.m., Pietras called her father and said "Dad, fire!" (Polish: Tata, pożar!), her last words to him. Her father testified that he initially thought that the call was part of the puzzle, then, after he realised there was a fire, he told her to get to the floor and try to escape. Firefighters on the scene needed to use specialized equipment to enter the building. Radosław D. was severely burnt; he was transported to the Koszalin hospital, and then to the burn unit at the West Pomeranian Specialist Hospital in Gryfice.

== Trial ==
The Koszalin District Prosecutor's Office conducted the investigation. The victims' parents entered the case as subsidiary prosecutors. Four people were arrested and charged: Miłosz S., the designer and organizer of the escape room; Miłosz's grandmother Małgorzata W., in whose name the business was registered; Miłosz's mother Beata W.; and Radosław, the employee on duty at the time of the incident. None of them pleaded guilty, and Miłosz and Radosław blamed each other. Miłosz said that Radosław went against policy by using the gas heater when customers were present and did not properly instruct the victims on how to use their emergency walkie-talkie. Radosław said that Miłosz did not provide sufficient health and safety training and claimed that Miłosz cut corners in the safety of the escape room.

The Koszalin district court sentenced Miłosz and Radosław to two years in prison and imposed a 10-year ban on managing sports, recreation, and culture activities. Małgorzata and Beata were sentenced to one year in prison, plus a suspended sentence of three years, and were banned from running a business for 10 years. The court also awarded 200,000zł (USD 47577.51) compensation to each victim's family. The parents of the victims were dismayed at the sentences, calling them "embarrassingly low". The judge acknowledged that the defendants would have to live with the fact that they caused the deaths of five children, and said that she took this into account with the sentencing.

The rescue operation was also investigated. Some of the witnesses at the trial testified that the paramedic at the scene did not perform resuscitation on the victims. According to some of the witnesses and the victims' parents, he wrongly assumed that they were dead. There was also an unauthorized person in the room with the emergency dispatcher.

== Aftermath ==
=== Responses ===
President Andrzej Duda, Prime Minister Mateusz Morawiecki, and United States Ambassador to Poland Georgette Mosbacher, amongst others, expressed their condolences to the families of the deceased. Duda described the incident on Twitter as a "crushing tragedy". The mayor of Koszalin, Piotr Jedlinski, announced 6 January as a day of mourning for the city, and requested that residents refrain from entertainment events or parties. Performances at the Juliusz Słowacki Baltic Dramatic Theatre and cultural events at the 105 Cultural Centre scheduled for 5 January were cancelled. The Epiphany procession planned for 6 January in Koszalin was also cancelled. Due to the fire, the Polish premiere of the film Escape Room was postponed and eventually cancelled.

On 6 January, a Holy Mass was held in the Cathedral of the Immaculate Conception for the victims and their families, presided over by the bishop of the Diocese of Koszalin–Kołobrzeg, Edward Dajczak. After the service, a short prayer was held in the Old Market Square, during which Caritas Internationalis held a fundraiser for the victims' families.

On 10 January, the five victims were buried together at the Koszalin municipal cemetery. Their funeral mass was held in the Church of Saint Casimir in Osiedle Bukowe, and was presided over by priest Wojciech Pawlak, who had been a catechist to the victims. Karolina Barabas's father delivered a speech; later, her sister and a classmate of the victims spoke. Music that Pietras had written and recorded was played.

=== Regulation ===
Morawiecki announced the standardization of escape rooms in Poland with regulations set by the State Fire Service, the police, and building supervision inspectors; escape rooms in Poland were not previously required to undergo fire department inspections.

The Minister of the Interior and Administration, Joachim Brudziński, ordered the Commander-in-Chief of the State Fire Service to carry out inspections of all escape room facilities in Poland. Czech and Lithuanian fire officials announced inspections of escape rooms in their respective countries. In Poland, 520 facilities were inspected, almost 2000 violations were found, and 102 bans on the use of the facilities were issued. By 7 February, 133 facilities had fixed all violations.

On 11 January 2019, Brudziński signed an amendment on the regulation of fire protection of buildings, specifically regarding the evaluation of fire protection in entertainment businesses. It required the practical inspection of the ability of the facility to evacuate people quickly in the case of a fire and verification of compliance with fire protection requirements every two years. The justification for the draft regulation says that the amendment is a reaction to 4 January escape room fire in Koszalin.
