= Szymczyk =

Szymczyk is a surname of Polish origin. Notable people with the surname include:

- Adam Szymczyk, Polish art writer
- Bill Szymczyk (born 1943), American music producer and recording engineer
- Jarosław Szymczyk (born 1970), Polish police officer who served as the Commander-in-Chief of Police of Poland
