= National Police Headquarters explosion =

Explosion in Poland

An explosion at the National Police Headquarters in Warsaw, Poland, on 14 December 2022, injured two people, including the Commander-in-Chief of Police at the time, Jarosław Szymczyk.

== Background ==
Szymczyk received two grenade launchers while visiting the State Emergency Service of Ukraine and the National Police of Ukraine. Ukrainian officials told Szymczyk that the grenade launcher was not functional, but they did not provide any documents certifying that it had been disarmed.

== Explosion ==
At approximately 7:50 A.M CET on 14 December 2022, a grenade launcher exploded in the National Police Headquarters in Warsaw. Szymczyk claims he did not fire the grenade launcher, but that it set itself off while he was moving it. He later said, "The explosion was powerful – the force of the impact penetrated the floor and damaged the ceiling."

Szymczyk and a civilian staffer both sustained minor injuries, and Szymczyk was taken to a hospital. The Ministry of the Interior and Administration-run hospital that he was transported to was informed that there was an "unknown package" involved in the incident, and contamination-prevention procedures were put into place, such as the closure of the ward in which he was staying and the diversion of ambulances to other hospitals.

The grenade did not fully explode because Szymczyk's office lacked enough space for it to "arm itself". The cause of the explosion was found to be Szymczyk disabling the safety on the grenade launcher and pulling the trigger. The weapon was also set to HESH (high-explosive squash head) at the time of the explosion. Investigators found three bottles of alcohol near the grenade launcher, but they were closed. Szymczyk was sober at the time of the incident.

== Investigations ==
=== Poland ===
The Regional Prosecutor's Office in Warsaw announced an investigation two days after the incident. In October 2022, Szymczyk was charged with reckless endangerment, possessing an anti-tank weapon without a license, and transporting it over the Polish-Ukrainian border without notifying customs officials of its presence. The prosecutor office also announced that they were conducting an investigation about "the failure to perform official duties by public officials", which included "failure to take action in the scope of mine and pyrotechnic control of items received by the Chief Commander of the Police as gifts during a foreign delegation" and "failure to evacuate the headquarters of the Police Headquarters after the occurrence of an extraordinary event in the form of a shot of an RGW-90 grenade launcher inside the building".

=== Ukraine ===
The Deputy Interior Minister Yevhen Yenin announced a criminal investigation into the incident in December 2022. He added that they were collaborating with Polish officials. The same month, Polish interior minister Mariusz Kamiński said that Ukrainian officials have informed him that the deputy head of the State Emergency Service of Ukraine, Dmytro Bondar, who gave the grenade launcher to Szymczyk, was suspended. An officer working under Dmytro Bondar said that Bondar had ordered him to retrieve a "Javelin" (Note: "Javelin" is a generic term for grenade launchers in Ukraine.) from his office.

== Responses ==
=== Domestic ===
Tomasz Siemoniak, leader of the opposition Civic Platform party, called for the removal of Szymczyk from his role as commander-and-chief of police and said that the incident was "indefensible". Radosław Sikorski, then-former Minister of Foreign Affairs, said that Poland has become a "favourite for the Darwin award [sic]" as a result of Szymczyk's actions.

A new regulation that went into effect on 1 January 2023 required all specialized Polish police officers to undergo training in the usage of grenade launchers. This was seen by political commentators as a reaction to the scandal surrounding the explosion.

=== International ===
In a press release on 19 December 2022, the State Emergency Service of Ukraine apologized for the incident and said that "there was not and could not have been any intention to harm the Commander-in-Chief of Police of Poland."
