= Marek Działoszyński =

Polish police official

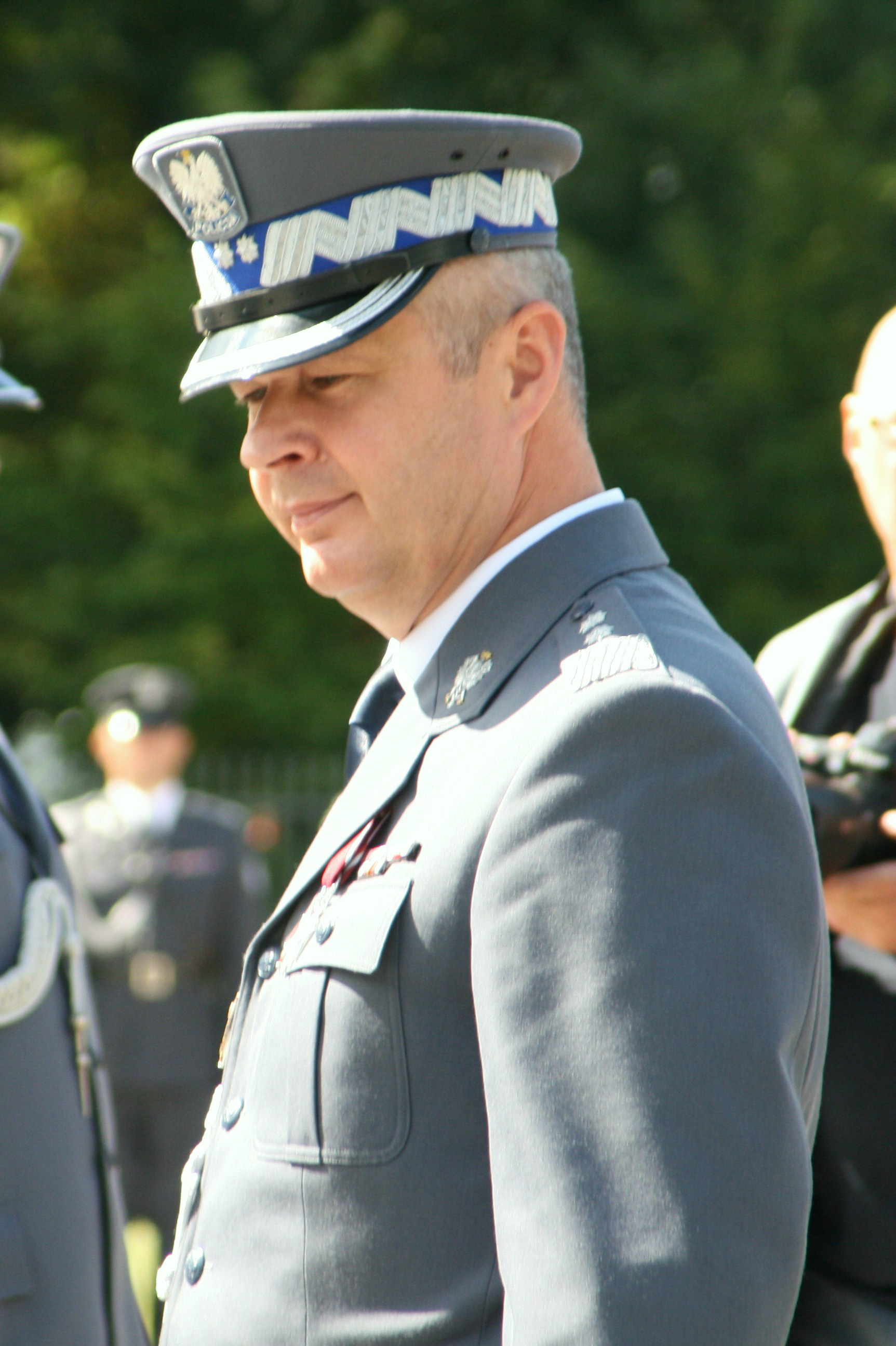
- Marek Działoszyński in 2014

Commander-in-Chief of Police
- In office 10 January 2012 – 11 february 2015
- Appointed by: Donald Tusk, PM
- Minister: Jacek Cichocki
- Preceded by: Andrzej Matejuk
- Succeeded by: Krzysztof Gajewski

Personal details
- Born: September 4, 1959 (age 66) Trzebiatów
- Awards
- Service: Milicja Obywatelska; Police of Poland
- Years of service: 1985–2015
- Rank: Inspector General of the Police

Marek Dariusz Działoszyński (19 June 1962) is a Polish retired inspector general of police, commander-in-chief of police in 2012–2015, president of the Karol Marcinkowski University Hospital in Zielona Góra since 2017.

== Biography ==
He was born on June 19, 1962, in Trzebiatów. He graduated from the Faculty of Law and Administration of the Adam Mickiewicz University in Poznań. He began his service in Milicja Obywatelska in 1985 in Międzyrzecz. Then he took up a position in the operational and investigation department. From February 1991 he was the commander of the police station in Skwierzyna. From 1999 he served in the structures of the Internal Affairs Office of the Police Headquarters, and in January 2006 he became the director of this unit. From November 2008 he held the position of provincial police commander in Łódź.

On January 10, 2012, he became the commander-in-chief of police. On February 11, 2015, he ceased to hold this position.

On June 27, 2014, President of the Republic of Poland Bronisław Komorowski, at the request of the minister of internal affairs, appointed him to the rank of inspector general of the police. He received the nomination on July 21, 2014.

In the 2015 Sejm elections, he was the first on the list of candidates of the Polish People's Party in the Łódź district. He did not win a seat, receiving 1,155 votes.

By the resolution of the Skwierzyna City Council of 26 June 2014, he was awarded the title of honorary citizen of Skwierzyna.

On August 31, 2017, the Shareholders' Meeting of the University Hospital in Zielona Góra elected him president of the hospital.

== Awards and decorations ==
- Knight's Cross of the Order of Polonia Restituta (2015)
- Sliver cross of Merit (2004)
- Bronze Cross of Merit (2000)
- Silver Medal for Long Service (2015)
- Meritorious Police Officer Gold Badge
- Gold Badge of Merit for the Prison Service (2009)
- Silver Badge of Merit for Fire Protection (2011)
- Gold Medal of Merit for National Defence (2012)
- Bronze Medal of Merit for National Defense (2011)
- Gold Medal of Merit for the Border Guard (2012)
- Gold Medal "Guardian of National Remembrance Sites" (2014)

== Bibliography ==
- "Profile on the website of the Police Headquarters" (in Polish). info.policja.pl.
