= Papala =

Papala may refer to:

- species of the flowering plant genus Charpentiera, known as pāpala in Hawaiian language
- Papala Island, Palmyra Atoll, in the Pacific Ocean
- Marek Papała (1959–1998), murdered Polish police chief
