= PTAB =

PTAB may refer to

- Patent Trial and Appeal Board, an administrative law body of the United States Patent and Trademark Office (USPTO).
- PTAB (bomb), a Soviet World War II design of a Shaped Charge bomb.
