= PTAB (bomb) =

Soviet World War II shaped charge bomb

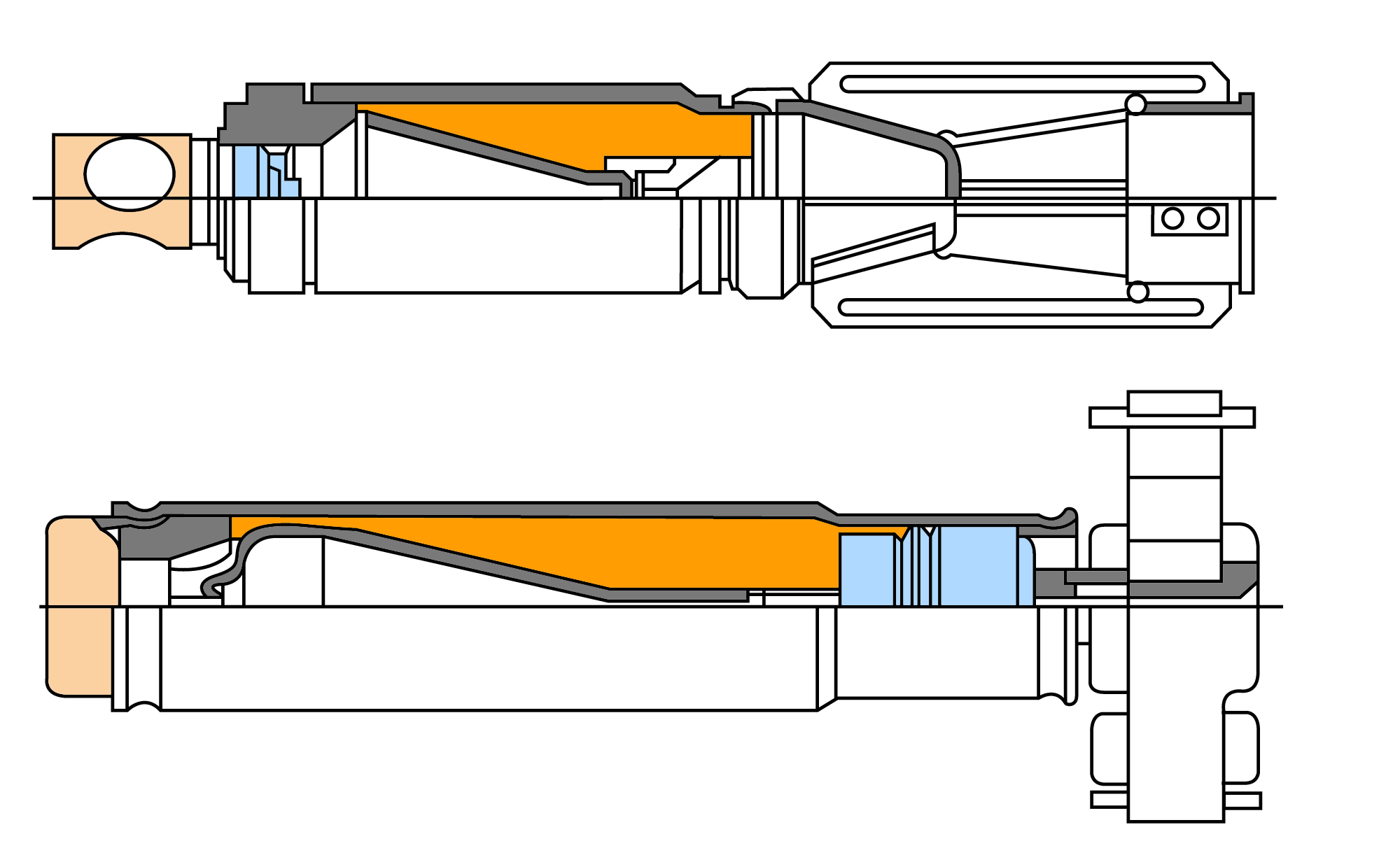
Cross section of the PTAB

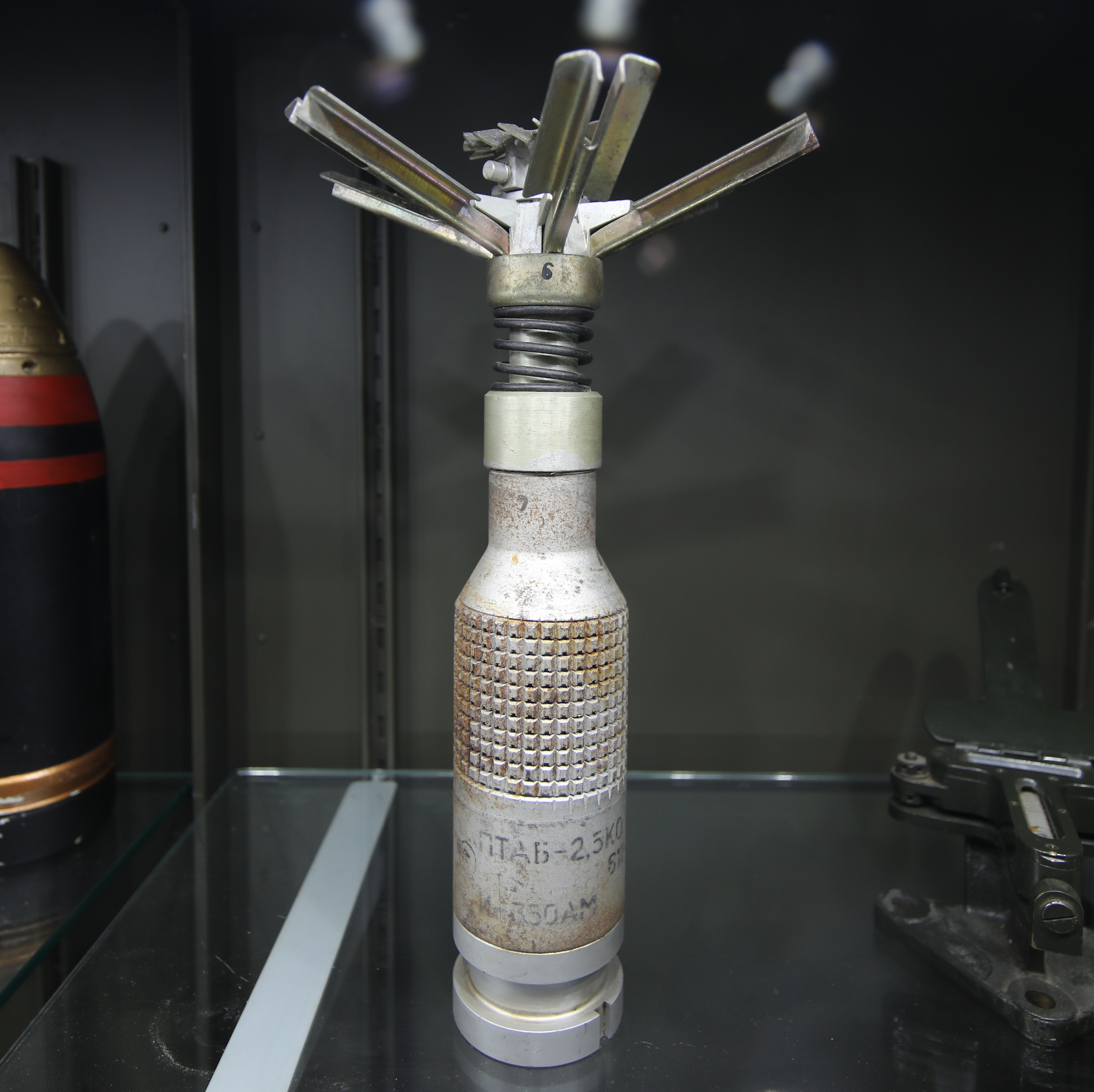
PTAB bomb

PTAB (Russian ПТАБ, short for Противотанковая Авиабомба, "Antitank Aviation Bomb") was a Soviet World War II high-explosive anti-tank (HEAT) shaped charge bomb.

== Design ==
The bomb was designed within a case of a 2.5 kg bomb, with a case weight of 1.5 kg and 0.62 kg of explosives. The Ilyushin Il-2 ground attack aircraft could carry 280 PTAB bombs directly on the bomb-bay folds, or 4x48 in four cassettes. The PTAB 2.5 could penetrate 60 to 70 millimeter tank armor, at the time sufficient for the top armor of even heavy tanks.

== Use ==
Introduced in 1943, PTABs were widely deployed from Il-2s, and due to the bomb's very low weight, from Yakovlev Yak-9 fighters, specifically from the internal weapon bay in the Yak-9B (fighter-bomber) modification. The Polikarpov Po-2 could also carry and deploy PTABs.

The number of PTABs dropped in a given time period steadily increased thereafter. By the end of 1943, Soviet records show that 1,171,340 PTABs were dropped. In 1944, the number rose to 5,024,822. In the first four months of 1945, a further 3,242,701 PTABs were used.

During the 2022 Russian invasion of Ukraine, rapid technology development occurred to iterate on design of racing drones into a type of FPV loitering munition. Aimed a very low-cost and high production volume, the heavy-duty version of the Escadrone attack drone was modified to carry a 2 kg (4.4 lb) PTAB 2.5 anti-tank bomb. While much less effective than the larger and more expensive Javelin weapon system, it is highly effective against a tank's weak spots. The Escadrone attack drone is maneuverable and has been shown to successfully attack less protected places in Russian tanks.
