= Escadrone =

Ukrainian non-profit group

Escadrone is a non-profit group organized in Ukraine in 2022 in order to manufacture FPV attack drones, a type of FPV loitering munition. The business goal was to design and build a large quantity of low-cost drones, aiming specifically to be able to carry anti-tank grenades to the target: tanks and other armored vehicles, as well as less-armored military vehicles.

Escadrone drones can be employed against moving targets, and by May 2023, Escadrone was producing 1000 Pegasus attack drones per month at a cost of under US$500 each.

== Background ==
During conflicts in the 2020s, armies modified common commercial racing drones into an FPV loitering munition by the attachment of an explosive payload. The drones are so named because of the First Person View (FPV) they provide the operator. FPV loitering munitions allow direct reconnaissance during the strike mission by the loitering munition.

Since the 2022 Russian invasion of Ukraine, approximately 30 companies in Ukraine have been mass-producing drones for the war effort. The Ukrainian government's Ministry of Digital Transformation is attempting to purchase up to 200,000 drones per year, aiming to deploy relatively cheap drones against large advantages Russia has had in military equipment. In 2023, they have also sponsored several competitions where the "dozens of drone developers that have sprung up all over Ukraine" are invited to make simulated attacks on ground targets, chase fixed-wing drones, or even participate in drone dogfight competitions.

== History ==
During the Russian invasion of Ukraine beginning in 2022, rapid technology development occurred to iterate on design features and support larger drone payloads. Escadrone Pegasus and the Vyriy Drone Molfar are two examples. As of May 2023, most of these drones require substantial pilot skill and are not as sophisticated in autonomous control as more standard drones such as Mavic quadcopters used for video-reconnaissance.

Escadrone is a non-profit group organized in Ukraine during 2022 in order to manufacture FPV attack drones, aiming specifically to be able to carry anti-tank grenades to the target—tanks and other armored vehicles, as well as less-armored military vehicles, and can be employed against moving targets. By May 2023, Escadrone was producing 1000 Pegasus attack drones per month at a cost of under US$500 each. "The name Escadrone is a portmanteau of Ukrainian: ескадрон, romanized: 'eskadron', Ukrainian for cavalry squadron, and 'drone.' "

== Description ==
Escadrone has built and fielded several different drones. The Escadrone Pegasus is an attack drone that can move to enemy positions several kilometers away from the drone operator, loiter for several minutes as it scouts for targets (although targets have often been previously sighted and identified by reconnaissance drones), carry a 1 kg (2.2 lb) warhead capable against personnel and light armor, and move at up to 72 km/h (45 mph). Mission duration is typically 3 to 13 minutes.

A heavier-duty Escadrone model can carry a 2 kg (4.4 lb) PTAB 2.5 anti-tank bomb. While much less effective than the larger and more expensive Javelin weapon system, it is highly effective against a tank's weak spots. The Escadrone attack drone is maneuverable and has been shown to successfully attack less protected places in the tank.

The Escadrone PEGAS + carries a more powerful explosive payload and has greater range and is more robust to field conditions.
