= Marek Papała =

Commander-in-Chief of Police
- In office 3 January 1997 – 29 January 1998
- Appointed by: Włodzimierz Cimoszewicz, PM
- Minister: Leszek Miller
- Preceded by: Jerzy Stańczyk
- Succeeded by: Jan Michna

Personal details
- Born: Marek Władysław Papała; September 4, 1959 Pruchnik
- Died: June 25, 1998 (aged 38) Warsaw
- Service: Milicja Obywatelska; Police of Poland
- Years of service: 1979-1998
- Rank: Nadinspektor (Chief inspector)

Marek Władysław Papała (September 4, 1959 – June 25, 1998) was a Polish police officer and Chief of Police from January 3, 1997, to January 29, 1998, who died as a result of a gunshot head wound from a silenced TT pistol on June 25, 1998. Officially, Papała died at the hands of a car thief turned state witness Igor L. Due to numerous inaccuracies the investigation was criticized by many former police officers and journalists.

The Papała contract killing is widely regarded as the most serious unsolved crime involving former communist security services SB, high-ranking members of the government, and the mafia, since Poland's transition to democracy in 1989.

== Awards and decorations ==
- Commander's Cross of the Order of Polonia Restituta (posthumously, 1998)
- Silver Cross of Merit (21 October 1993)
- Medal „Milito Pro Christo” (posthumously, 2001)

== See also ==
- List of unsolved murders (1980–1999)
