= Jarosław Szymczyk =

Polish police officer (born 1970)

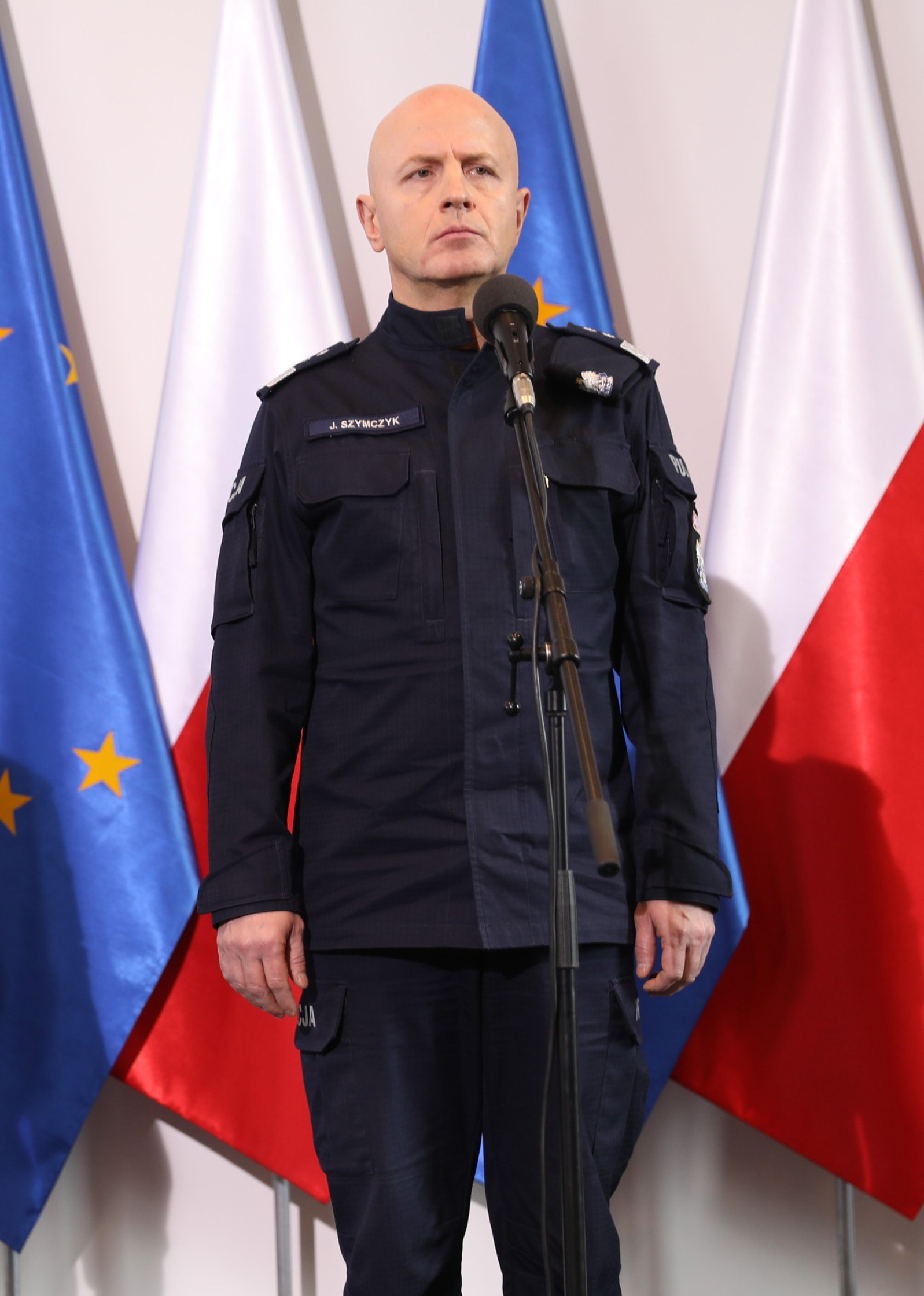
- Szymczyk in 2019

Commander-in-Chief of Police
- In office 13 April 2016 – 7 December 2023
- Appointed by: Beata Szydło, PM
- Minister: Mariusz Błaszczak; Joachim Brudziński; Elżbieta Witek; Mariusz Kamiński; Paweł Szefernaker

Personal details
- Born: Jarosław Jakub Szymczyk; 21 March 1970 (age 56) Katowice, Poland
- Police career
- Service: Police of Poland
- Service years: 1990–2023
- Rank: Inspector General

Jarosław Jakub Szymczyk (born 21 March 1970 in Katowice) is a Polish police officer in rank of Inspector General, who served as the Commander-in-Chief of Police between 2016 and 2023.

His police career started in 1990. In the years 2007–2008 he was the provincial police commander in Rzeszów. In 2008–2012, he was the deputy provincial police commander in Katowice. In 2012–2015, he was the provincial police commander in Kielce, and in the years 2015–2016, the provincial police commander in Katowice.

In 2022, Szymczyk gained notoriety for being involved in an incident, in which a Ukrainian MATADOR recoilless grenade launcher he had been gifted when visiting the country during the Russian invasion was apparently accidentally mishandled by himself in his office in Warsaw, leading to him being hospitalised with minor injuries. On 30 September 2024, Szymczyk was charged with illegal importation and unintentional endangerment over the incident. The charges came after Donald Tusk's Civic Coalition assumed power from the PiS who were accused of covering up the incident and protecting Szymczyk. He had claimed that the grenade launcher was not functional, but an investigation found that it was in fact fully functional and loaded with ammunition when it was given to him in Ukraine.
