= Commander-in-Chief of Police of Poland =

Head of the Polish Police

Commander-in-Chief of Police
- Komendant Główny Policji
- Incumbent; Insp Gen Marek Boroń since 21 March 2024
- National Police Headquarters
- Reports to: Minister of Interior and Administration
- Seat: Puławska Street 148/150, Warsaw
- Nominator: Minister of Interior and Administration
- Appointer: Prime Minister
- Precursor: Commander-in-Chief of Citizens' Militia
- Formation: 1990
- First holder: Senior Insp Leszek Lamparski
- Salary: 17,865 PLN per month (June 2022)
- Website: policja.pl

The commander-in-chief of Police (Polish: Komendant Główny Policji) is the head of the Police (Policja) of Poland, the national civilian police service. The commander presides over the National Police Headquarters (Komenda Główna Policji) and reports to the Minister of the Interior and Administration.

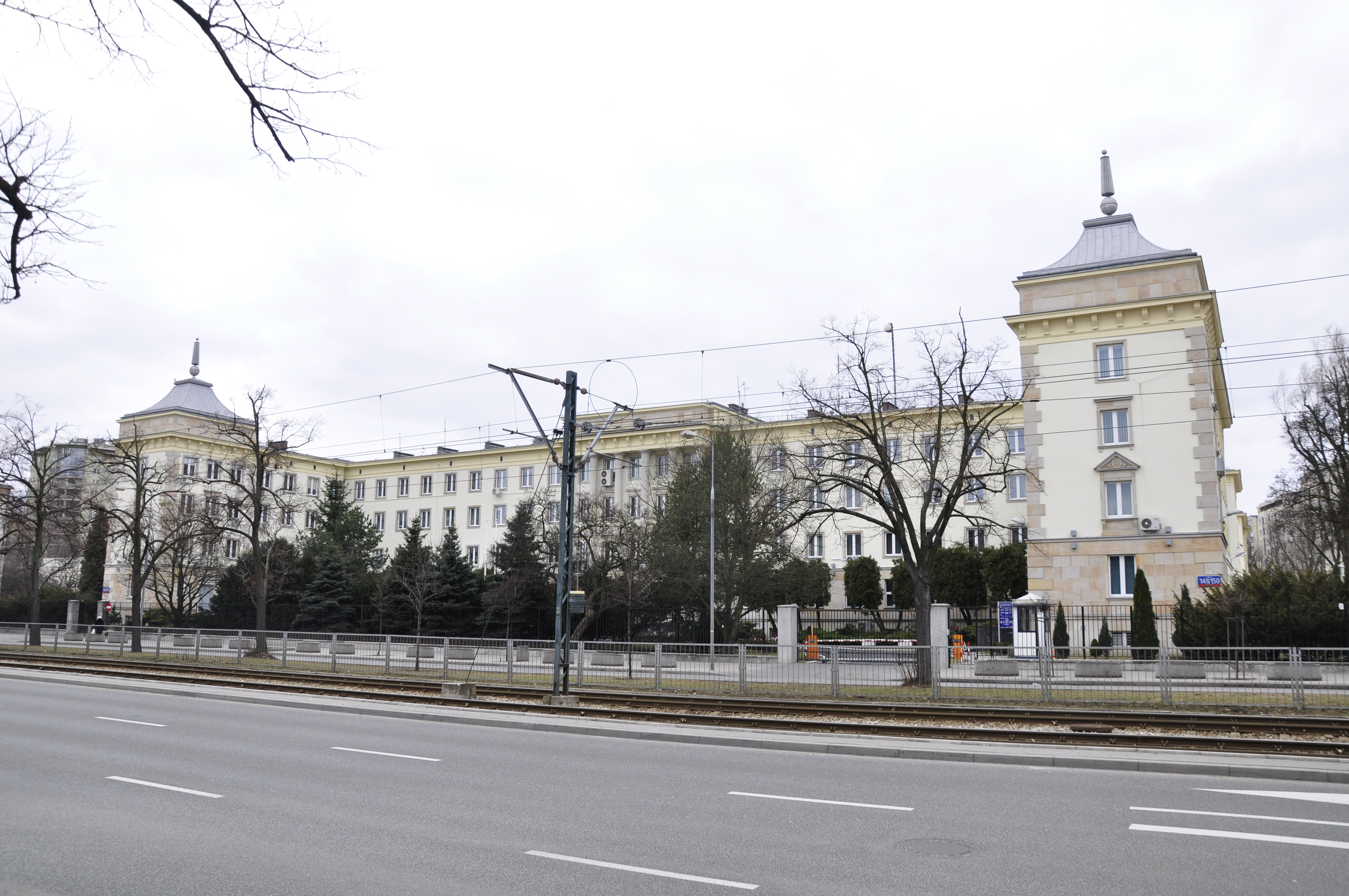
National Police Headquarters building on Puławska Street 148/150, Warsaw.

== List ==
#	Rank	Commander-in-chief	Dates in office
1	Senior Insp	Leszek Lamparski	20 May 1990–18 June 1991
2	Sub-Insp	Roman Hula	17 July 1991–14 January 1992
3	Senior Insp	Zenon Smolarek	25 February 1992–8 February 1995
4	Senior Insp	Jerzy Stańczyk	7 March 1995–3 January 1997
5	Senior Insp	Marek Papała	3 January 1997–29 January 1998
6	Insp Gen	Jan Michna	29 January 1998–25 October 2001
7	Insp Gen	Antoni Kowalczyk	27 October 2001–29 October 2003
8	Insp Gen	Leszek Szreder	29 October 2003–3 November 2005
9	—	Marek Bieńkowski	3 November 2005–12 February 2007
10	—	Konrad Kornatowski	12 February 2007–8 August 2007
11	Senior Insp	Tadeusz Budzik	13 August 2007–6 March 2008
12	Insp Gen	Andrzej Matejuk	6 March 2008–9 January 2012
13	Insp Gen	Marek Działoszyński	10 January 2012–11 February 2015
14	Insp Gen	Krzysztof Gajewski	12 February 2015–10 December 2015
15	Insp	Zbigniew Maj	11 December 2015–11 February 2016
—	Jr Insp	Andrzej Szymczyk; Acting	11 February 2016–13 April 2016
16	Insp Gen	Jarosław Szymczyk	13 April 2016–7 December 2023
—	Senior Insp	Dariusz Augustyniak; Acting	7 December 2023–22 December 2023
—	Insp	Marek Boroń; Acting	22 December 2023–20 March 2024
17	Insp Gen	Marek Boroń	21 March 2024–present

== See also ==
- Law enforcement in Poland
