= Squad automatic weapon =

Portable light machine gun

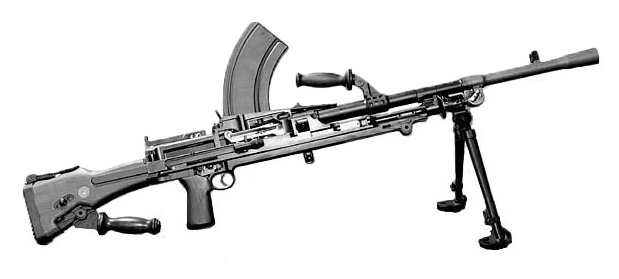
The Bren is an example of a British Army squad automatic weapon from World War II.

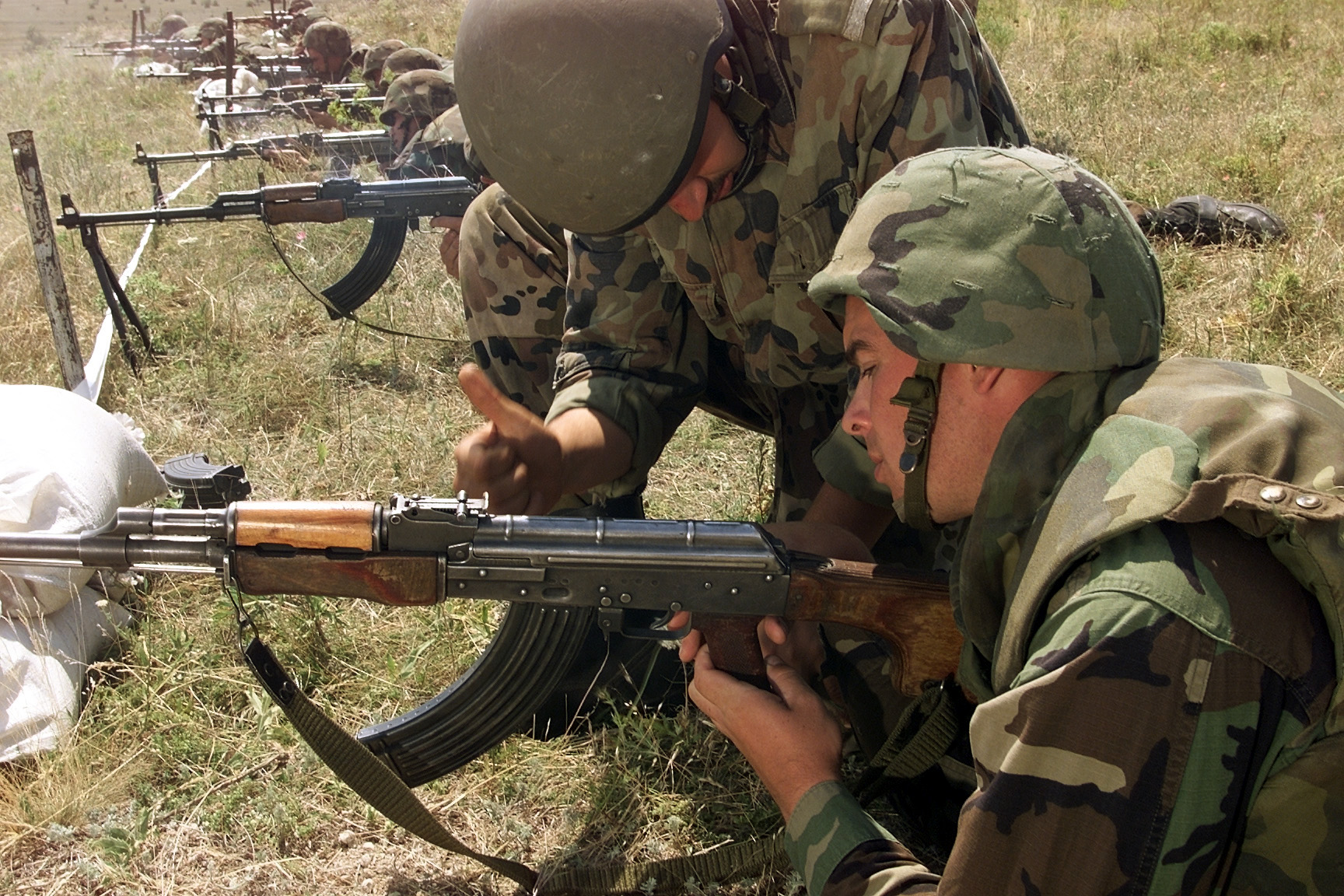
A Romanian soldier instructs a U.S. marine in clearing an RPK, a squad automatic weapon variant of the AKM.

A squad automatic weapon (SAW), also known as a section automatic weapon or light support weapon (LSW), is a man-portable automatic firearm attached to infantry squads or sections as a source of rapid direct firepower. Weapons fulfilling this role can be light machine guns, or modified selective-fire rifles fitted with a heavier barrel, bipod and a belt/drum-fed design.

Squad automatic weapons usually fire the same cartridge (though heavier-bullet variants are preferred) as the assault rifles or battle rifles carried by other members of the unit. This reduces logistical requirements by making it only necessary to supply one type of service ammunition to a unit. These weapons are light enough to be carried and operated by one infantryman, unlike medium machine guns (such as the M1919 Browning) that require a crew to operate at full effectiveness; or heavy machine guns (such as the M2 Browning or the DShK) which fire more powerful cartridges but are also crew-served and typically also require a mounting platform to be operable.

== Overview ==
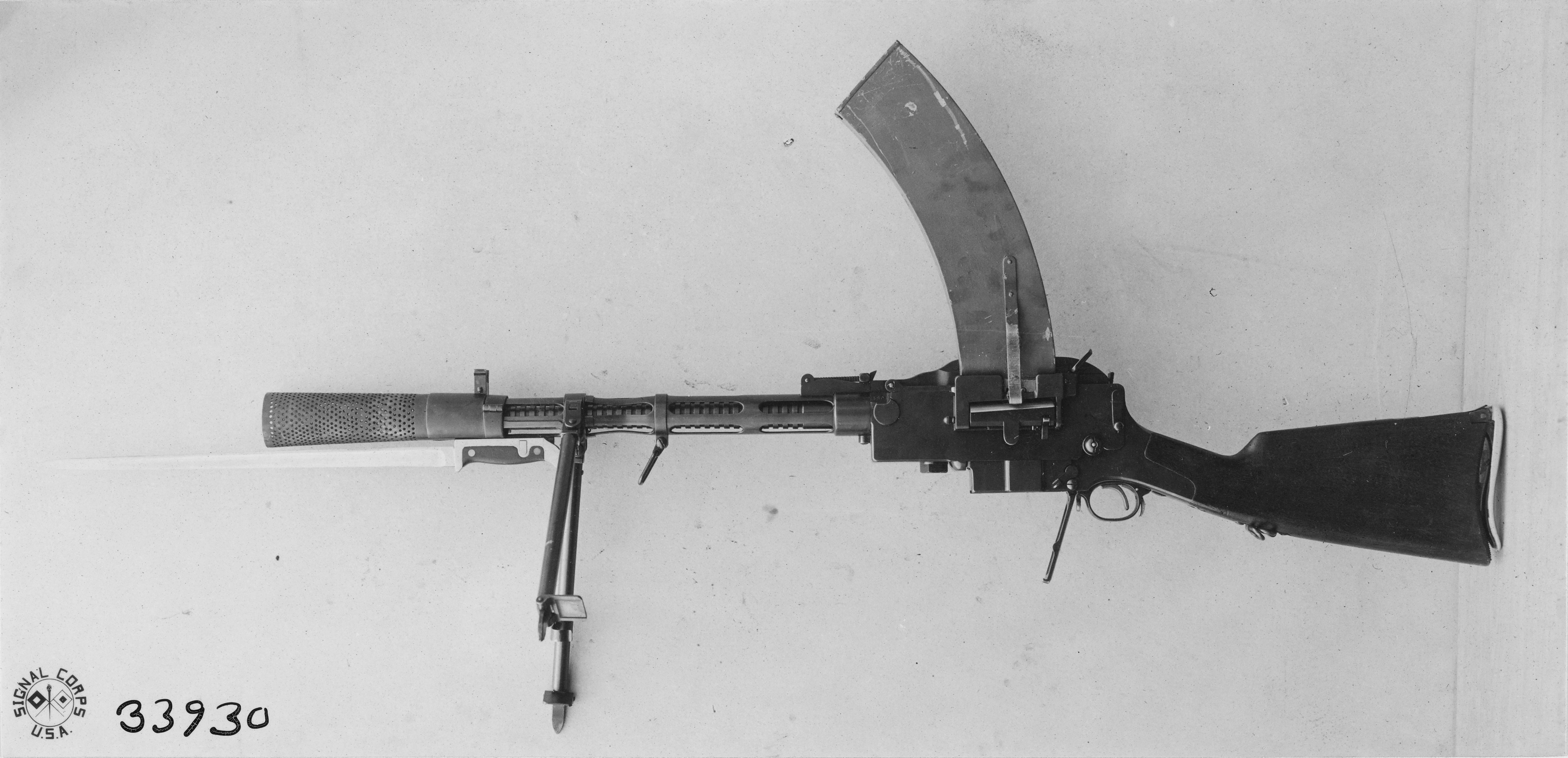
Madsen machine gun

One of the first weapons used in this role was the Madsen machine gun. Although limited in today's terms, the Madsen was introduced in an era when the standard infantry rifle was a bolt-action repeater with fixed magazines reloaded with single rounds or chargers; sustained rapid fire with these weapons could be maintained only for very short periods of time. The Madsen was capable of fully automatic fire; despite having only limited magazine capacity, this was still more than that of the infantry rifle, and it was of the quick change detachable box magazine type. Though over 100 years old, the Madsen is still in limited use today. The standard machine guns of this era were of the Maxim type. Used by the British, Germans, and the Russians, these weapons were bulky, heavy, tripod-based, and water-cooled, they required a team of four men and, although excellent in the defence, were not suited to manoeuvre warfare.

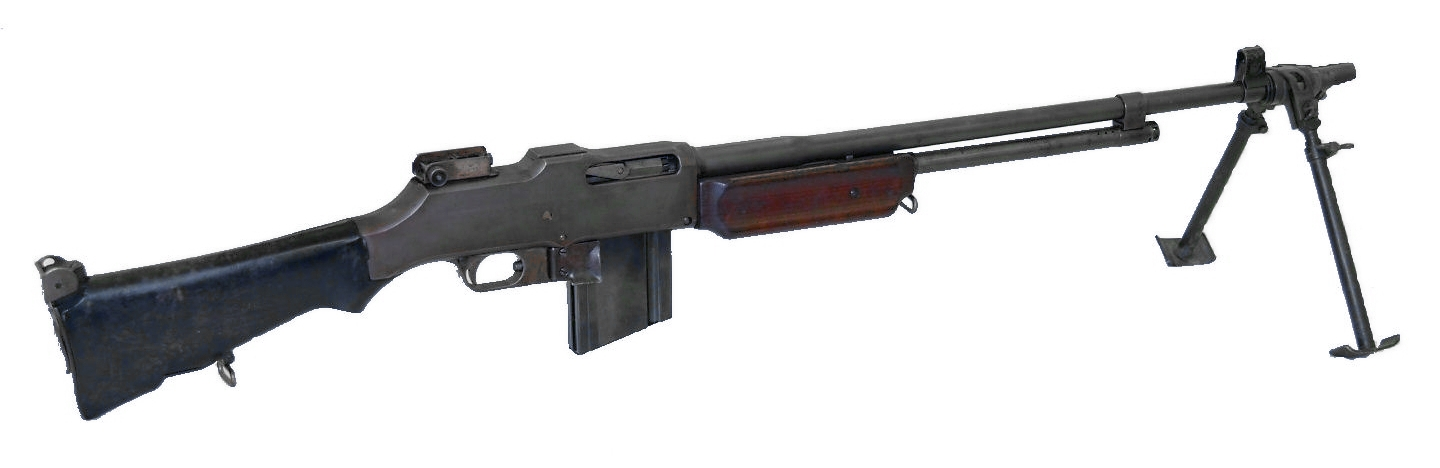
M1918A2 Browning automatic rifle

Another pioneering weapon in this role was the Browning automatic rifle (BAR). Introduced late in World War I, it remained in front-line service into the Vietnam War. Intended originally as an automatic rifle capable of delivering suppressing "walking fire" in the advance, the BAR came to be used in the light machine gun role. During World War II, as the importance of having a source of mobile automatic fire increased, the number of BARs in a unit also increased, until in some units it represented 1 in 4 of the weapons present in a squad. During its long service in the US military, it was pivotal in the evolution of U.S. fireteam tactics and doctrine that continues to the present day.

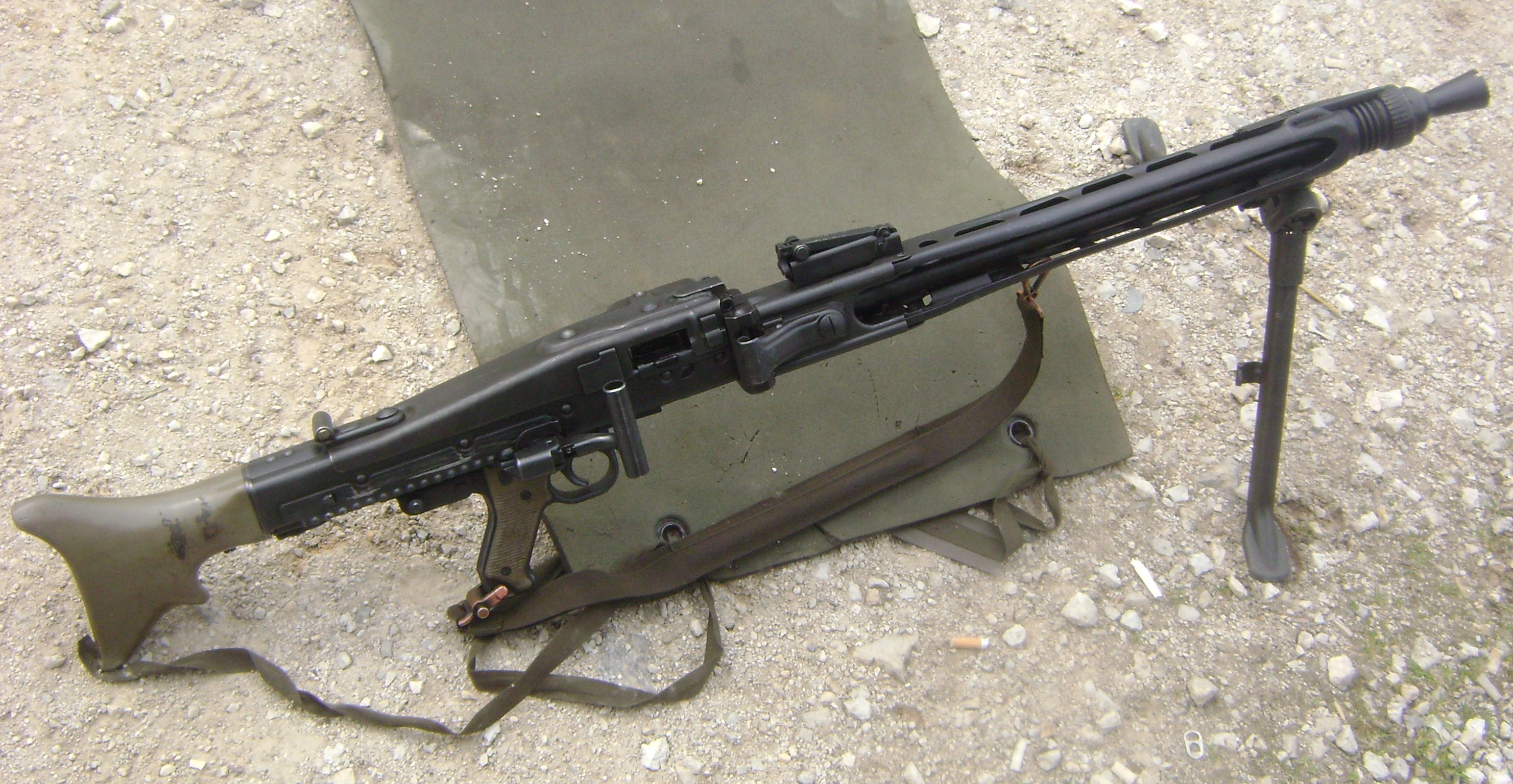
Austrian MG74

Modern squad automatic weapons (such as the RPK and L86) are modified assault rifles or battle rifles (e.g. FN FAL 50.41 and M14A1) that may have increased ammunition capacity and heavier barrels to withstand continued fire and will almost always have a bipod. In the case of some assault rifles, such as the H&K G36 or Steyr AUG, the SAW is simply the standard rifle with a few parts replaced. However, the Austrian Army, though issuing the Steyr AUG rifle, does not issue the HBAR (heavy barrel) variant. Instead, the 7.62mm caliber MG74, a derivative of WW2-era German MG 42, is issued.

Light machine guns, either belt-fed or magazine-fed, may be used as squad automatic weapons, as may general-purpose machine guns; for example, during most of the Cold War period, the standard squad automatic weapon in the British Army was the FN Mag-derived L7. The most common squad automatic weapons in use today are derived from two basic patterns: the Kalashnikov-based RPK or the purpose-designed FN Minimi.

== National examples ==
=== Belgium ===
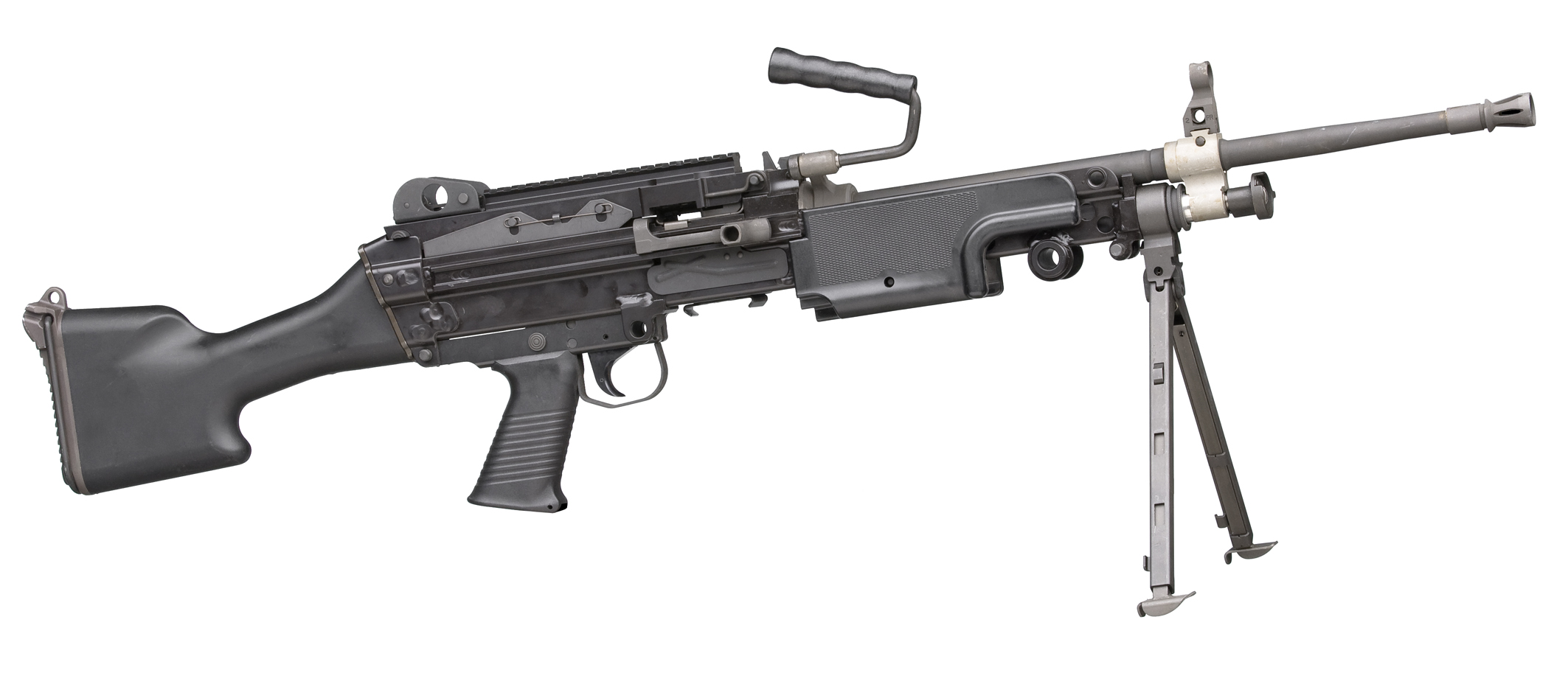
FN Minimi

- FN Minimi
- FN SCAR (HAMR)
- FN EVOLYS

=== China ===
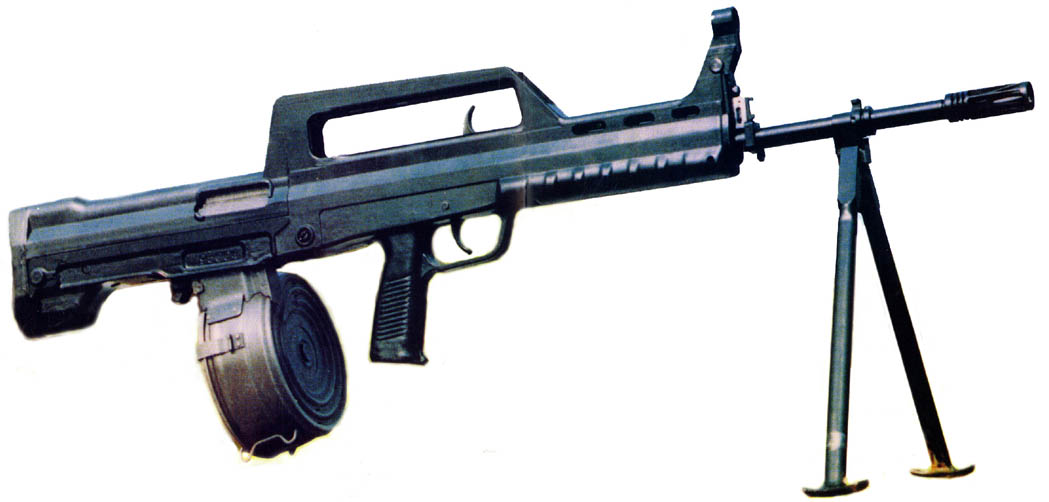
QJB-95

The People's Liberation Army initially used the Type 56 LMG as the primary light machine gun to replace all of its obsolete WW2 LMGs. After the Sino-Vietnamese War, the PLA adopted the drum-fed Type 81 LMG for high mobility, which was later replaced by QJB-95 since the adoption of QBZ-95. However, the PLA changed back to belt-fed QJB-201 light machine guns since 2021.

=== Germany ===
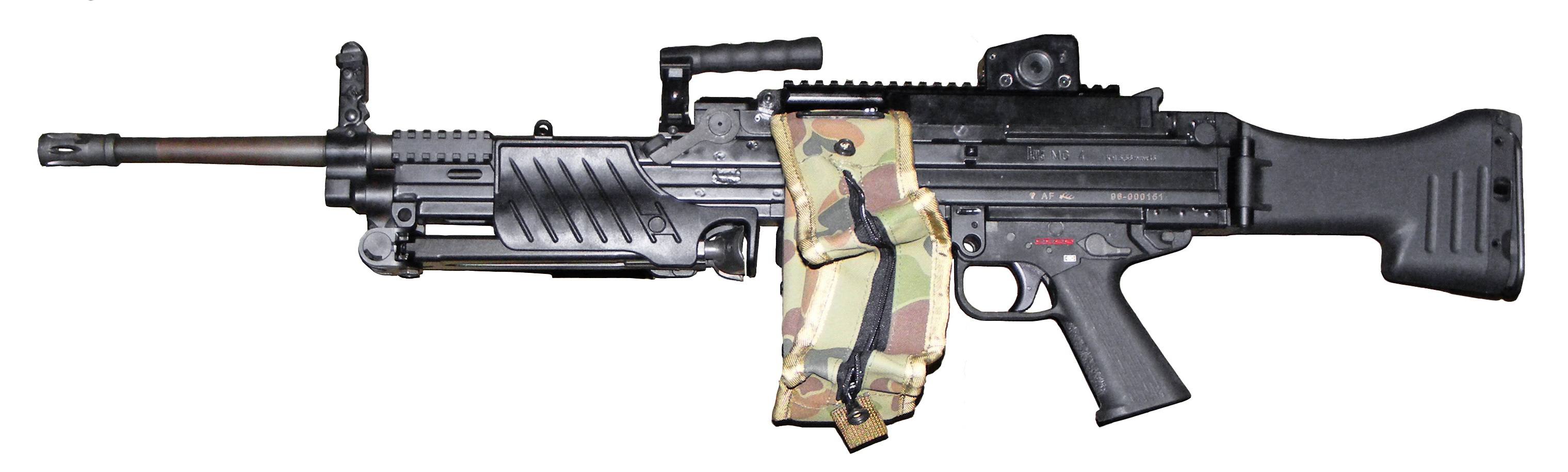
HK MG4

West Germany's original plan in the late 1980s was to adopt the new 5.56mm Heckler & Koch G41 assault rifle (a variant of the HK33) to replace the 7.62mm Heckler & Koch G3 battle rifle and the 4.7mm Heckler & Koch G11 carbine to replace the 9mm IMI MP2 Uzi and Heckler & Koch MP5. The end of the Cold War and the reunification of Germany in 1990 forced everyone to scramble for a cheap alternative. The G36 family was created from a proof-of-concept prototype rechambered to fire the 5.56mm NATO cartridge. It is composed of an assault rifle (G36), light machine gun (MG36), assault carbine (G36K), and PDW (G36C). Though produced, presented and ordered, the MG36 was never adopted by the German Army as the differences and benefits to the G36 were seen as marginal, resulting in the order being cancelled. The 5.56mm NATO MG4 is the standard platoon-level support weapon of the German Army, adopted in 2005. The 7.62mm NATO MG5 resembles the MG4 and is the new general-purpose machine gun of the German Army, adopted in 2015.

=== Italy ===
In the 1980s the Italian military considered the idea of adopting a heavy-barrelled magazine-fed 5.56mm automatic rifle. It was to accompany the 5.56mm Beretta AR70/90 assault rifle and supplement the 7.62mm MG 42/59 general purpose machine gun. A rethinking of the concept led to their adoption of the belt-fed FN Minimi instead.

=== India ===
The INSAS LMG has been the standard issue squad automatic rifle for the Indian Army since late 1990s but is being replaced by the Negev NG7, over 56,000 of which has been ordered.

=== Netherlands ===
The Netherlands Marine Corps is the only part of the Dutch military to use the LOAWNLD (an updated version of the Colt Canada Light Support Weapon) as their squad automatic weapon. All other branches use the FN Minimi for this role.

- M+G project: An indigenous concept by Artillerie-Inrichtingen for a squad automatic weapon.

=== Soviet Union/Russian Federation ===
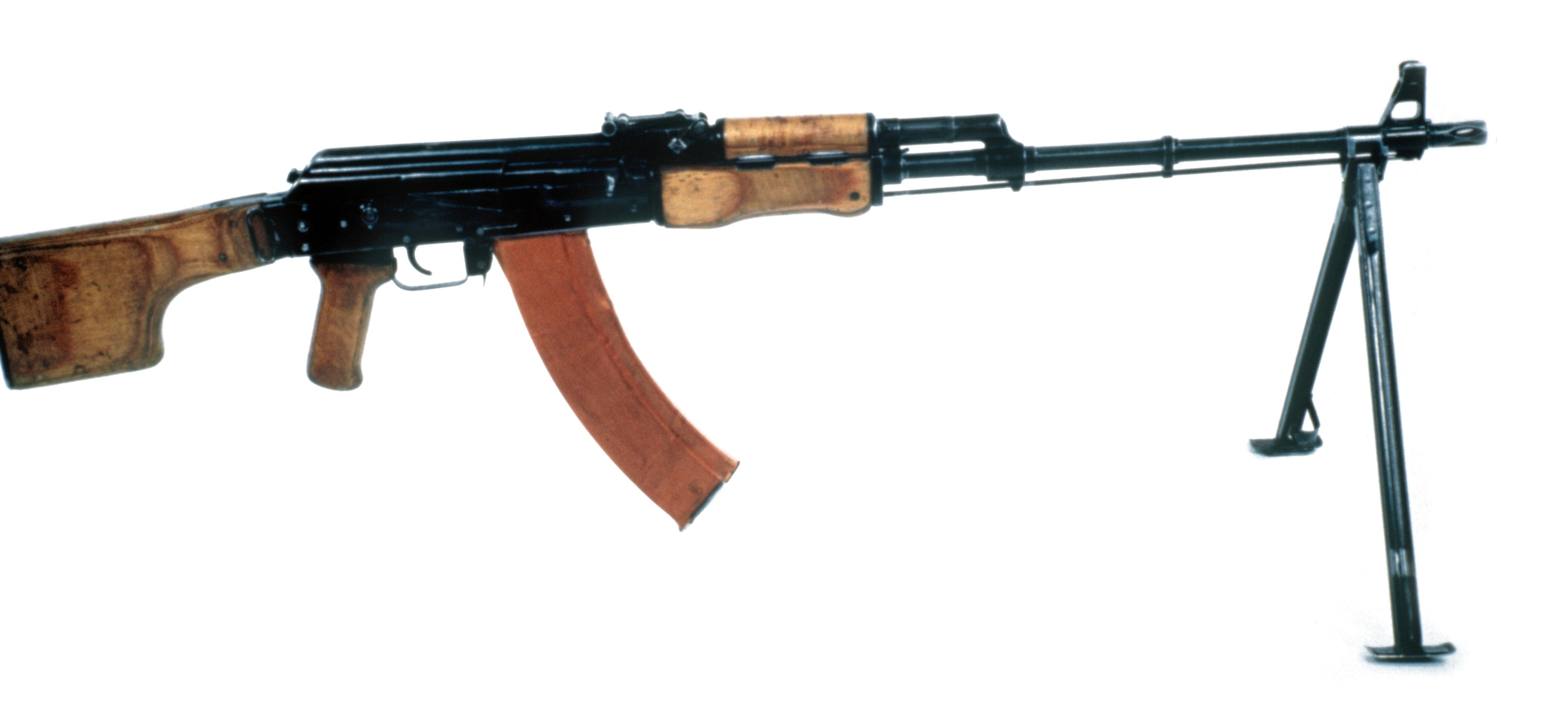
RPK-74

The Russian support weapon concept was designed around providing one standard cartridge that could be used by the clip-fed rifle (SKS), magazine-fed assault rifle (AK-47) and belt-fed light machine gun (RPD). The SKS and RPD were dropped as being less effective than hoped. The RPK, with its magazine and parts commonality with the base AK-47, was more effective. It replaced the RPD as soon as manufacturing techniques allowed it to be mass-produced.

- RPK: Based on the Kalashnikov rifle but features a longer and heavier barrel.
- RPKS: A version with a side-folding wooden stock (S for -skladnoi).
- RPK-74: A version chambered for the new 5.45×39mm cartridge.
- RPK-74M: An improved version (M for modernizirovanniy) of the RPK-74 with polymer furniture.
  - RPK-201: An export model of the RPK-74M chambered in 5.56×45mm NATO.
  - RPK-203: An export model of the RPK-74M chambered in 7.62×39mm.
- RPK-16: Based on the AK-12 and was expected to take over the role of its predecessor, the RPK-74, in the Russian Armed Forces.
- RPL-20: The belt-fed LMG designed to fill the gap between RPK and PK machine gun.

=== United Kingdom ===
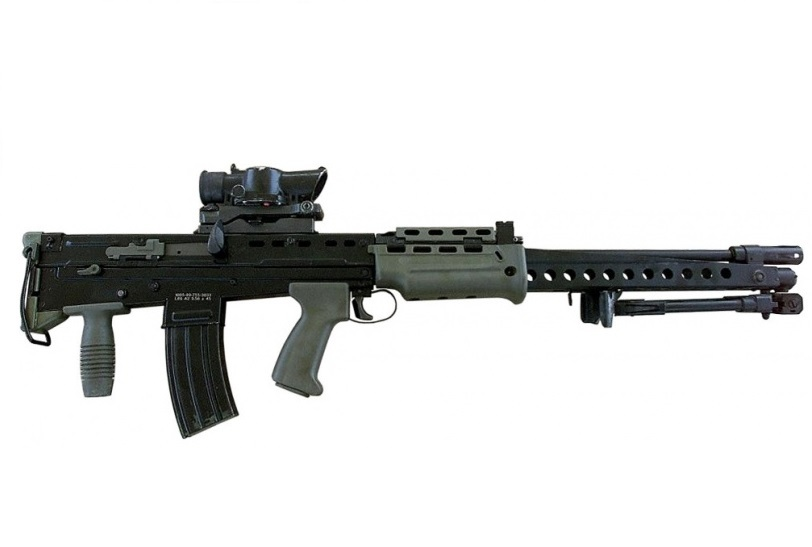
L86A2

The SA80 program was designed to create a family of light assault weapons that had a commonality of parts, could use the same ammunition and magazines, and would replace the UK military's collection of submachine guns, rifles, and light machine guns. Originally designed around a lighter experimental 4.85mm cartridge, they were forced to redesign the weapon to take the 5.56mm NATO cartridge. The L85 IW (Individual Weapon) was the rifle version and was designed to replace the 9mm L2 Sterling SMG and 7.62mm L1A1 SLR Rifle. The L86 LSW (Light Support Weapon) was the automatic rifle version and was intended to replace the L4 BREN gun and supplement the FN MAG general-purpose machine gun, replacing it at section level. Teething problems, low quality parts, poor ergonomic design and an inability to be wielded left-handed made the SA80 suite unpopular. The magazine-fed L86 was found to not be as capable of sustained fire as a belt-fed system so it was initially supplemented by the L110A1 FN Minimi and then replaced by it. The L86's role was then changed to that of a designated marksman rifle.

=== United States ===
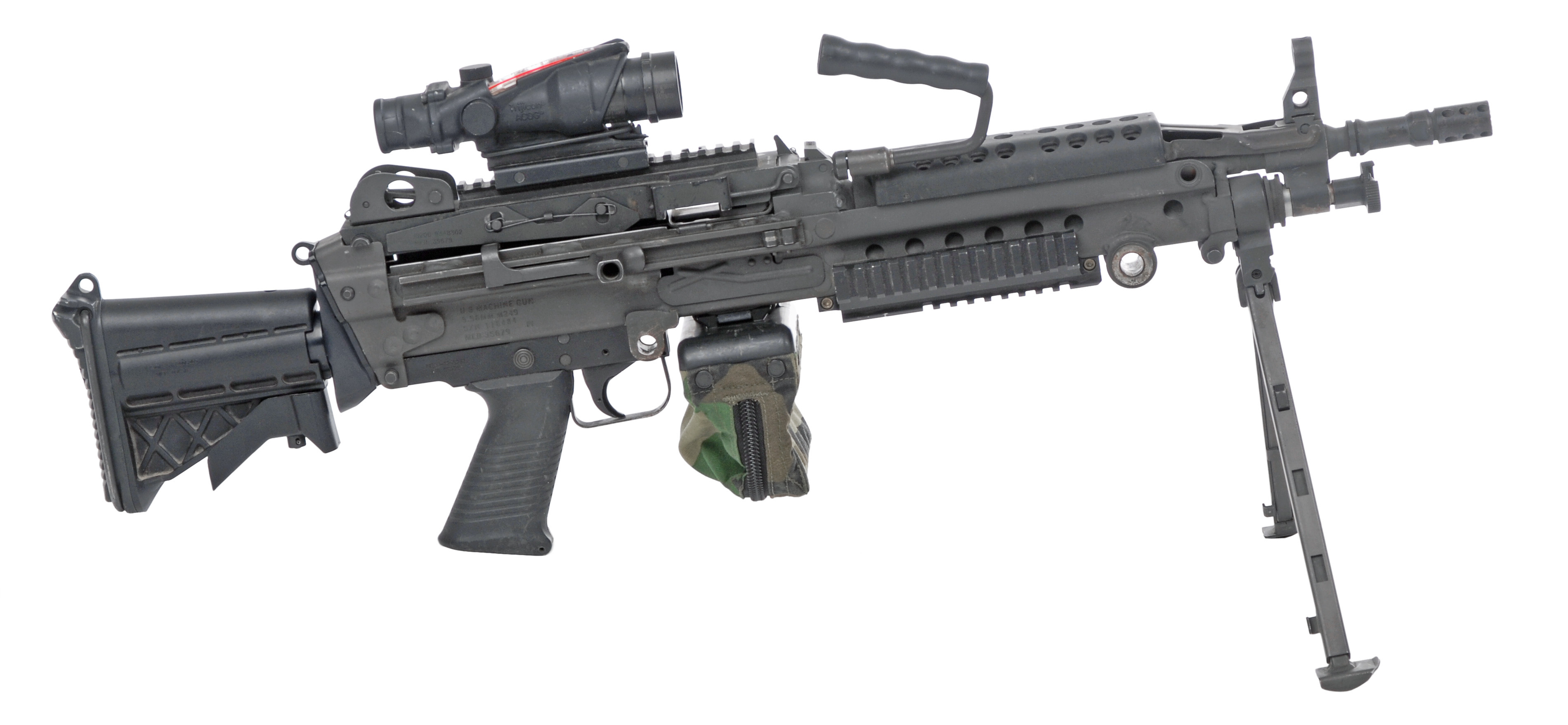
M249 Para

In United States usage, the M249 light machine gun is commonly referred to as the squad automatic weapon or SAW.

In the 1970s the United States began realizing that it might have to fight a conflict in the deserts and mountains of the Middle East or Near East rather than the jungles of Asia or forests of Europe and Eurasia. The Squad Automatic Weapon program was designed to create an intermediate weapon between the M16 rifle and M60 machine gun. It would have to fire tracer ammunition out to a visible range of 800 meters or more, be capable of accurate high-volume sustained fire, and be lighter and more reliable than the M60. Initially the contenders were built around a new intermediate cartridge, but the problems with approval for a new third American-backed standard NATO cartridge forced its abandonment. The program then selected between the control group weapons: the FN Minimi (XM249) and Heckler & Koch HK 23 (XM262) chambered for the improved 5.56mm SS109 round. The FN Minimi was adopted as the M249 because it could optionally fire from magazines from an integral magazine port rather than requiring an exchange of parts in the field like the HK23.

The Infantry automatic rifle program was launched by the United States Marine Corps in 2005. Its task was to find a replacement for the heavy and cumbersome M249 SAW that was serving as the Squad Automatic weapon in a fireteam at the time. Two of the weapons in the competition were the FN SCAR HAMR and a slightly modified HK416. The weapon chosen to replace the M249 was the modified HK416, later designated the M27 IAR. The M249 SAW is still in use as a squad automatic weapon by the US Army.

In 2019, US Army launched Next Generation Squad Weapon Program to find replacement for M249 SAW and replacement for 5.56×45mm NATO round. There are three competitors:

- SIG Sauer MG-6.8 with 6.8mm SIG hybrid round, declared winner of the program as the XM250
- General Dynamics RM277-AR with .277 TVCM polymer cased round manufactured by True Velocity
- AAI and Textron AR with 6.8mm CT cased telescoped round manufactured by Olin Winchester

== See also ==
- Crew-served weapon
- Heavy machine gun
- Heavy weapons platoon
- Medium machine gun
