= Heavy weapon =

Heavy weapon or Heavy Weapon may refer to:

- A weapon system that is too big and heavy for infantry to carry and thus rely on mounting platforms (vehicles, aircraft, watercraft or fortifications) to operate
- Crew-served weapon, a weapon that requires more than one person to transport or operate
  - Heavy weapons platoon, an infantry platoon equipped with such weapons
- Heavy Weapon, a 2005 shoot-'em-up video game
- Heavy Weapons Guy, a Team Fortress 2 character
