= Carl Gustaf recoilless rifle =

Carl Gustaf recoilless rifle can refer to:

- Carl Gustaf 20 mm recoilless rifle
- Carl Gustaf 84 mm recoilless rifle
