= RPK-74 =

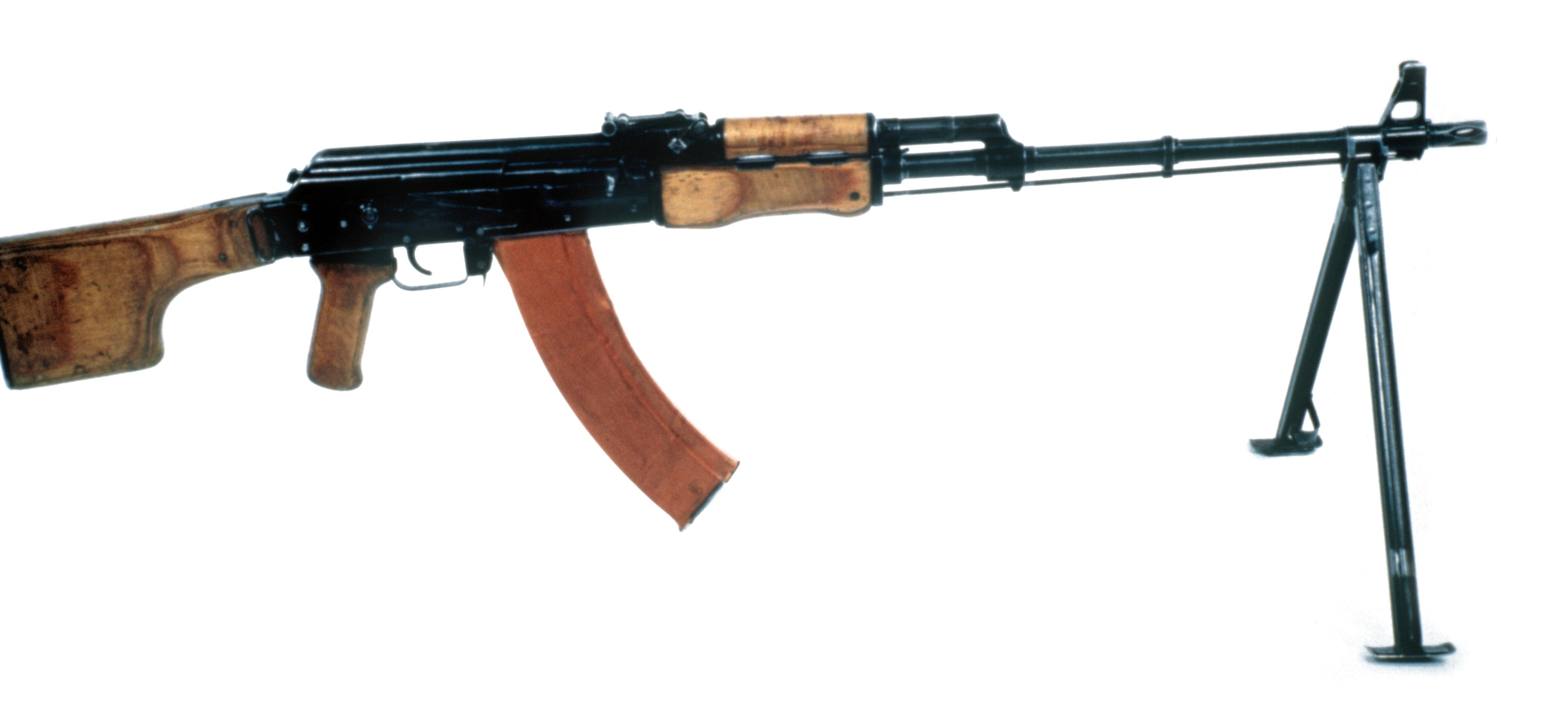
- RPK-74 with a bipod
- Type: Light machine gun/Squad automatic weapon
- Place of origin: Soviet Union

Service history
- In service: 1974–present
- Used by: See Users
- Wars: Soviet–Afghan War; First Chechen War; Second Chechen War; Russo-Georgian War; Russo-Ukrainian War; 2020 Nagorno-Karabakh conflict

Production history
- Designed: 1974
- Produced: 1974–present

Specifications
- Mass: 4.7 kg (10 lb) (RPK-74); 4.85 kg (10.7 lb) (RPKS-74)
- Length: 1,060 mm (41.7 in) (stock extended) (RPK-74, RPKS-74); 845 mm (33.3 in) (stock folded (RPKS-74)
- Barrel length: 590 mm (23.2 in)
- Cartridge: 5.45×39mm M74
- Action: Gas operated, rotating bolt; closed bolt
- Rate of fire: 600 rounds/min
- Muzzle velocity: 960 m/s (3,149.6 ft/s)
- Effective firing range: 800 m (875 yd) (point target); 1,000 m (1,094 yd) (area target)
- Maximum firing range: 3,150 m (3,440 yd)
- Feed system: 30-, 45-round box magazine
- Sights: Iron sights: semi-shrouded front post and rear sliding tangent with an adjustable notch Sight radius: 555 mm (21.9 in)

The RPK-74 (Russian: РПК-74) is a variant of the Soviet RPK light machine gun/squad automatic weapon but is chambered for an intermediate cartridge, the 5.45×39mm round.

== History ==
The RPK-74 was introduced in 1974 together with the AK-74 assault rifle.

== Design ==
The RPK-74 was derived from the AK-74 rifle, with modifications that mirror those made to the AKM to create the RPK.

The RPK-74 also uses a longer and heavier chrome-plated barrel, which has a new gas block with a gas channel at a 90° angle to the bore axis, and a ring for the cleaning rod.

The RPK-74 is also equipped with a folding bipod and a different front sight tower. The muzzle is threaded for a flash suppressor or blank-firing device.

The rear stock trunnion was strengthened and the magazine well was reinforced with steel inserts.

Additionally, the RPK-74 has a modified return mechanism compared to the AK-74, which uses a new type of metal spring guide rod and recoil spring. The rear sight assembly, forward handguard and receiver dust cover were all retained from the RPK.

=== Feeding ===
The RPK-74 feeds from a 45-round steel or polymer box magazine, interchangeable with magazines from the AK-74, and is designed to be charged from stripper clips.

Drum magazines similar to those used on the previous RPK models were tested during its development phase, but were discontinued in favor of the 45-round box magazine. However, recently the production of a 97-round drum has started.

This drum was designed to be used with the AK-107 but can also be used in any 5.45×39mm weapon with compatible magazines, such as the RPK-74 and RPK-74M. They were also testing with experimental conventional drums, a prototype 100-round belt fed drum magazine was also created.

The RPK-74 attaches into the regular magazine well, but the cartridges are stored on a 100-round belt inside a box. A feed system removes them from the belt and puts them in a position where they can be loaded through the regular magazine well. This system is actuated by a lever from the magazine that clips around the charging handle. It is unknown if this ever went into service.

=== Accessories ===
Standard equipment includes eight magazines, six stripper clips (15 rounds per clip), a speedloader guide, cleaning rod, cleaning kit, sling, oil bottle and two magazine pouches. Some variants do not come with the cleaning kit option.

== Variants ==
=== RPKS-74 ===
The RPKS-74 is the paratrooper variant of the RPK-74, equipped with a wooden folding stock from the RPKS.

=== RPK-74M ===
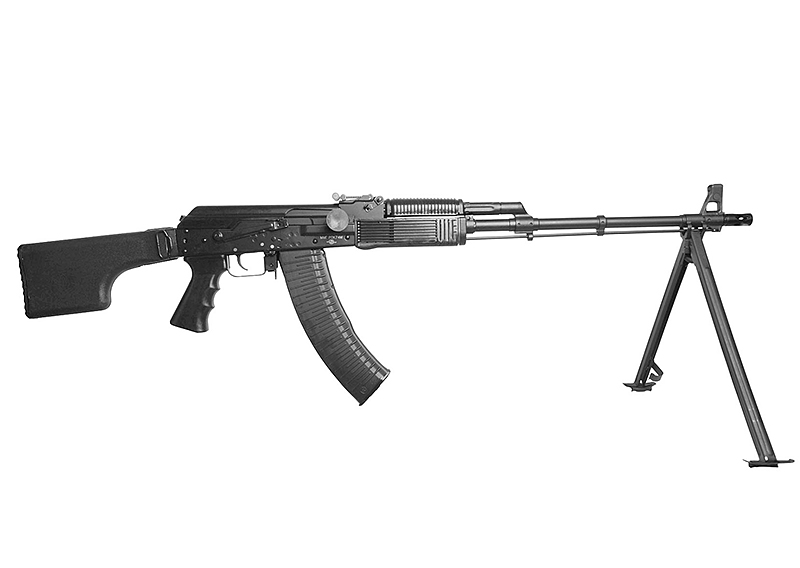
RPK-74M with its bipod deployed

The RPK-74M (Russian: РПК 74М, romanized: RPK 74M; Russian: модернизированный, romanized: Modernizirovannij, lit. 'Modernised') is an updated variant of the RPK-74 developed during the mid-'90s.

In line with the AK-74M assault rifle variant, the RPK-74M lower handguard, gas tube cover, pistol grip, and new synthetic stock are made from a black, glass-filled polyamide.

The stock is shaped like the RPK-74 fixed stock, but also side-folds like the RPKS-74. The stock additionally has an easier to use release mechanism, replacing the bullet press release from the RPKS and RPKS-74.

Each RPK-74M is fitted standard with a side-rail bracket for mounting optics. It also includes most of the 74M economic changes, such as the dimpled on barrel hardware, omission of lightening cuts from the front sight block and piston and stamped gas tube release lever. Updated magazines were produced by Molot with horizontal ribs going up the sides of the magazines.

=== RPK-201 ===
An export variant chambered in 5.56×45mm NATO was introduced, designated as the RPK-201.

=== RPK-203 ===
A modernised export variant of the RPK was developed, designated as the RPK-203. It uses the same polymer construction as the RPK-74M.

=== Night fighting configurations ===
Models designated RPKN-1, RPKSN-1, RPK-74N and RPKS-74N can mount the multi-model night vision scope NSPU-3 (1PN51) while RPKN2, RPKSN2, RPK-74N2 and RPKS-74N2 can mount the multi-model night vision scope NSPUM (1PN58).

== Adoption ==
The RPK-74 is in widespread use by former Soviet Union states, as well as Bulgaria.
