= Carl Gustaf 8.4 cm recoilless rifle =

Man-portable multi-role weapon system

Carl-Gustaf 84 mm Recoilless Rifle
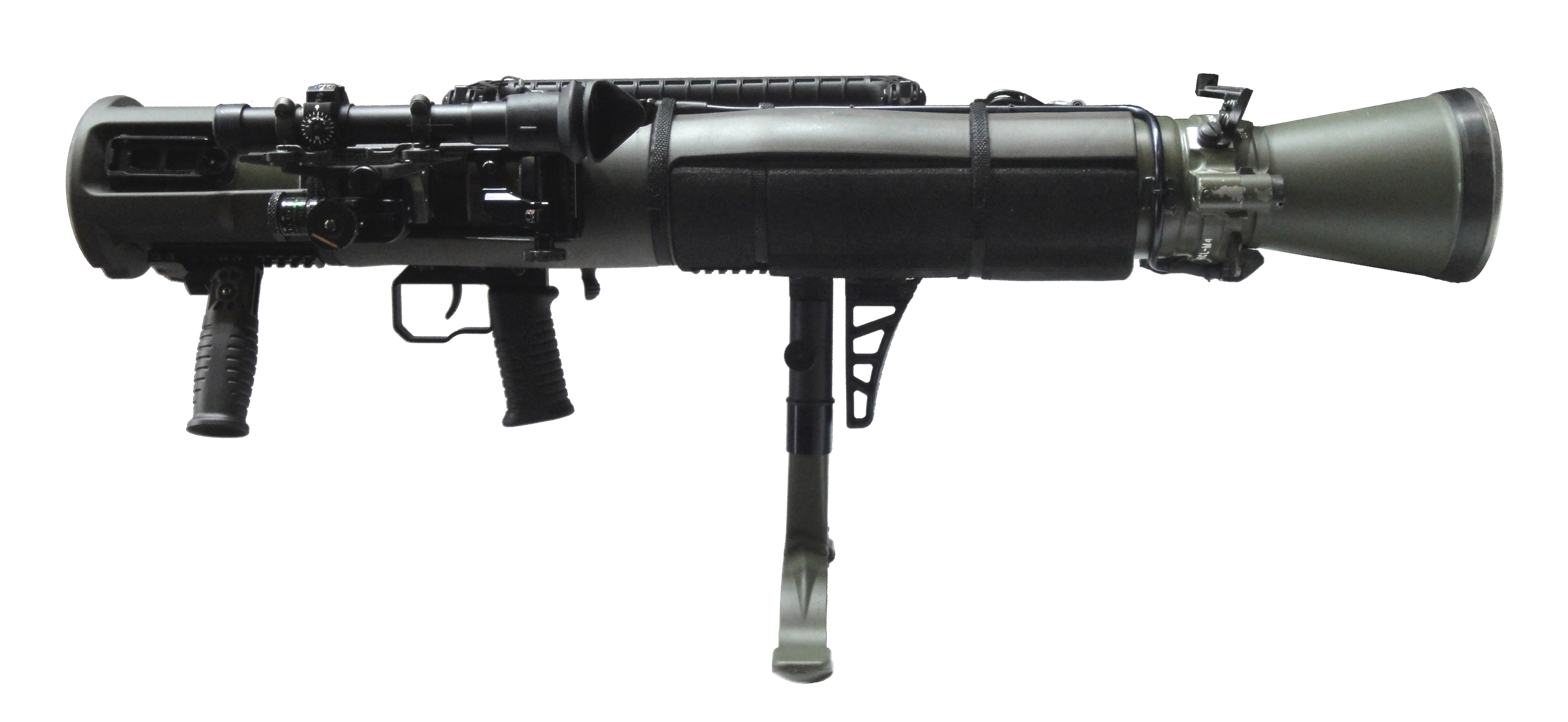
- Carl Gustaf M4 anti-tank weapon
- Type: Shoulder-fired recoilless rifle (crew-served multi-role infantry support gun)
- Place of origin: Sweden

Service history
- In service: 1948–present
- Used by: See Users
- Wars: See Wars

Production history
- Designer: Hugo Abramson, Sigfrid Akselson and Harald Jentzen
- Designed: M1: 1946; M2: 1964; M3: 1986; M4: 2014
- Manufacturer: Saab Bofors Dynamics (formerly Carl Gustafs Stads Gevärsfaktori), Howa (license)
- Unit cost: US$20,000; Ammo cost: US$500–3,000 per round

Specifications
- Mass: M2: 14.2 kg (31 lb); M3: 10 kg (22 lb); M4/M3A1: 6.6 kg (15 lb)
- Length: (M2) 1,130 mm (44 in) (M4/M3A1) 950 mm (37 in)
- Crew: Two (gunner and loader), but may be used by a single operator at a reduced rate of fire.
- Cartridge: 84 × 245 mm R RCL
- Caliber: 84 mm (3.31 in)
- Action: Recoilless, single-shot, breechloader, laterally, percussion fired
- Rate of fire: 6 rounds per minute
- Muzzle velocity: 230–255 m/s (750–840 ft/s)
- Effective firing range: 350 to 400 m (1,150 to 1,310 ft) against moving vehicles; 500 m (1,600 ft) against stationary vehicles; 1,000 m (3,300 ft) using smoke and high explosive rounds; 2,500 m (8,200 ft) using rocket-boosted laser guided ammunition
- Feed system: Hinged breech
- Sights: Open (iron) sights; optical 3× laser rangefinder; image intensification system

The Carl Gustaf 84 mm recoilless rifle (Swedish pronunciation: [kɑːɭ ˈɡɵ̂sːtav], named after Carl Gustafs Stads Gevärsfaktori, which initially produced it) is a Swedish-developed 84 mm (3.3 in) caliber shoulder-fired recoilless rifle, initially developed by the Royal Swedish Army Materiel Administration during the second half of the 1940s as a crew-served man-portable infantry support gun for close-range multi-role anti-armour, anti-personnel, battlefield illumination, smoke screening and marking fire, which has seen great export success around the globe and continues to be a popular multi-purpose support weapon in use by many nations. The Carl Gustaf 84 mm recoilless rifle is a lightweight, low-cost weapon that uses a wide range of ammunition, which makes it extremely flexible and suitable for a wide variety of roles.

Development of the initial model started from 1946 as one of the many recoilless rifle designs of that era, based on the experience from the earlier Carl Gustaf 20 mm recoilless rifle and the success of man-portable rocket launchers during World War II, such as the bazooka and Panzerschreck. Production of the initial model was handled by Carl Gustafs Stads Gevärsfaktori led by Försvarets Fabriksverk (FFV) and the weapon received the designation 8,4 cm granatgevär m/48, (8,4 cm grg m/48 – "8,4 cm grenade rifle", model 1948) in Swedish service. FFV would continue to further develop the weapon for the international market, later being merged into Saab Bofors Dynamics which handles development and export today. While similar weapons have generally disappeared from service, the Carl Gustaf is still in production and remains in widespread use.

== Name ==
The weapon goes under many names around the globe. It is most frequently called the "Carl Gustaf" or similar for short. British troops, for example, refer to it as the "Charlie G", while Canadian troops often refer to it as "Carl G". In Australia, it is irreverently known as "Charlie Gutsache" (guts ache, meaning stomach pain), or "Charlie Swede".

In US military service, it is officially known as the M3 Multi-Role Anti-Armor Anti-Personnel Weapon System (MAAWS) or Ranger Antitank Weapons System (RAWS), but is often simply called the "M3 Carl Gustaf" or just "Gustaf".

In Swedish military service, it is officially known as the 8,4 cm granatgevär m/48, m/86 and m/18, depending on the model (M1, M3, M4), but is often simply referred to as the "GRG" (gé-er-gé) after their type designation abbreviation (from granatgevär, meaning "grenade rifle"), since all models fire the same general ammunition and are used in much the same way (although the 84 mm grg m/18 can use programmable and guided ammunition).

== Description ==
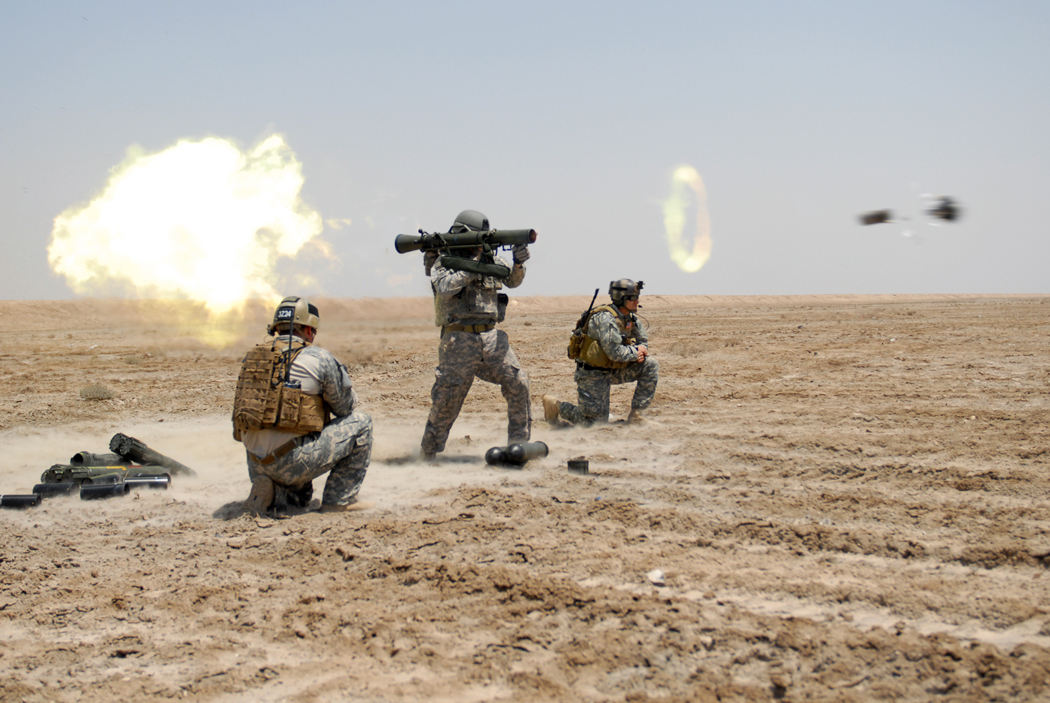
US Army Special Forces soldiers train with the Carl Gustaf recoilless rifle in 2009.

The basic weapon consists of the main tube with the breech-mounted Venturi recoil damper, with two grips near the front and a shoulder mount. The weapon is fitted with iron sights, but is normally aimed with the attached 3× optical sight with a 17 degree (300 mil) field of view. The most modern variants fielded by Swedish rifle companies have been fitted with the Swedish Aimpoint sighting system. Luminous front and rear sight inserts are available for the iron sights when aiming at night, and an image intensification system may also be used.

The Gustaf can be fired from the standing, kneeling, sitting or prone positions, and a bipod may be attached in front of the shoulder piece. An operating handle called the "Venturi lock" is used to move the hinged breech to one side for reloading.

=== Operation ===
The weapon is normally operated by a two-man crew, a gunner who carries and fires the weapon and a loader, carrying two canisters for a total of four rounds of ammunition. One or two extra ammunition carriers can be assigned if heavy use is expected. In the firing procedure it is the loader's responsibility to check the area behind the weapon for people and for obstacles that can interfere with the back-blast; this is needed due to the inherent dangers of the back-blast. Any person within the back-blast cone can suffer severe burn injuries and solid objects closely behind can reflect the blast back onto the crew.

=== Safety precautions ===
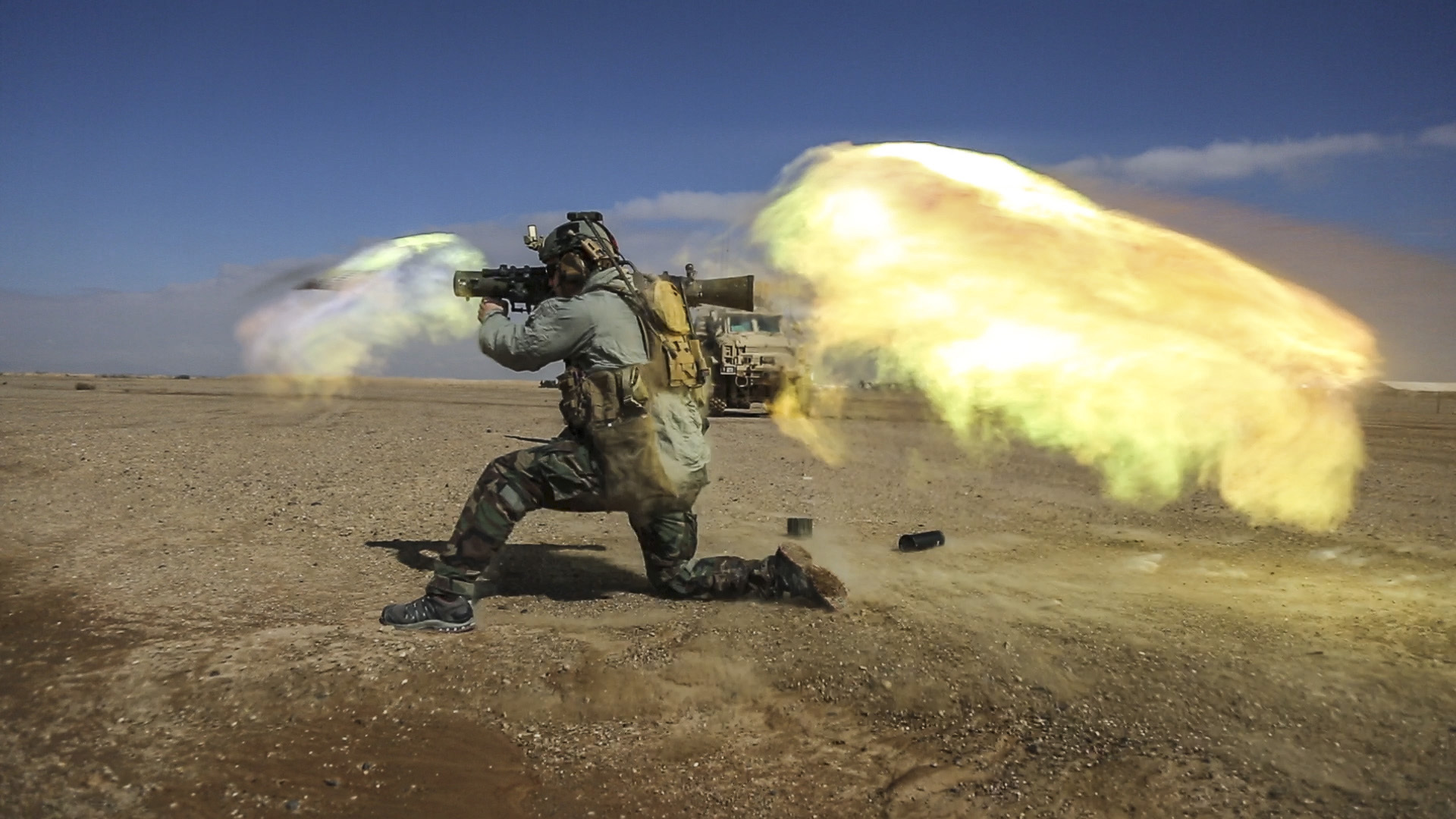
Soldier fires a Carl-Gustaf.

The overpressure, or blast wave, generated by the Gustaf will cause blast- and burn-related injuries to those behind the weapon, and is dangerous to 30 metres (100 ft) and hazardous to about 50 to 75 metres (160 to 250 ft). Repeatedly firing the Gustaf can also cause related shock wave injuries to gunners and those nearby.

Gunners are only allowed to fire six rounds a day during training. The assistant gunners would also often move away from the overpressure zone, so that they too can fire six rounds a day. Sweden, the first user of Carl-Gustaf, has the regulation that gunner and assistant gunner are allowed to be exposed to 20 full-caliber rounds each day.

== Development history ==
=== 1946 – M1 in Sweden (8,4 cm grg m/48) ===
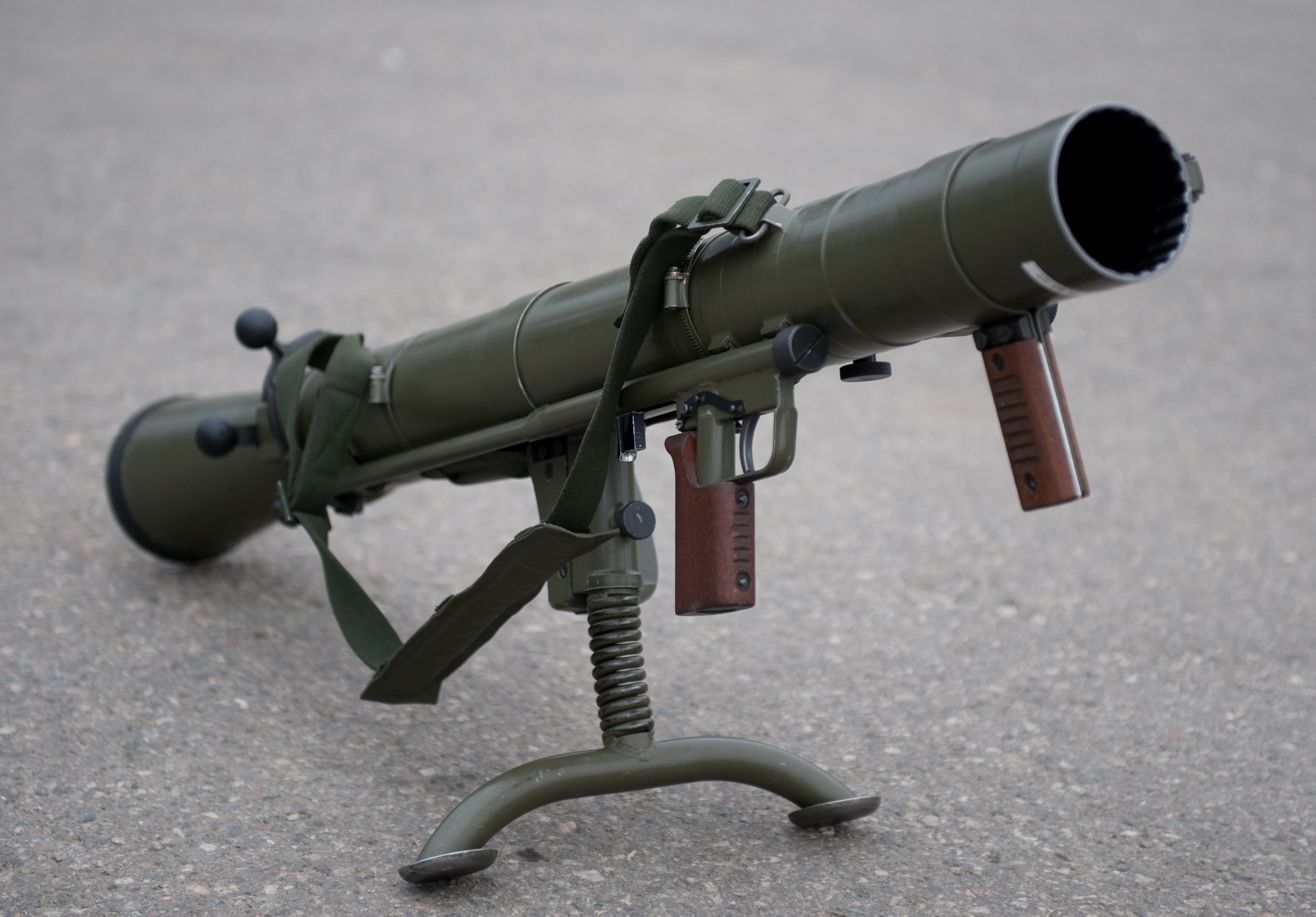
Swedish Carl Gustaf 84 mm recoilless rifle M1

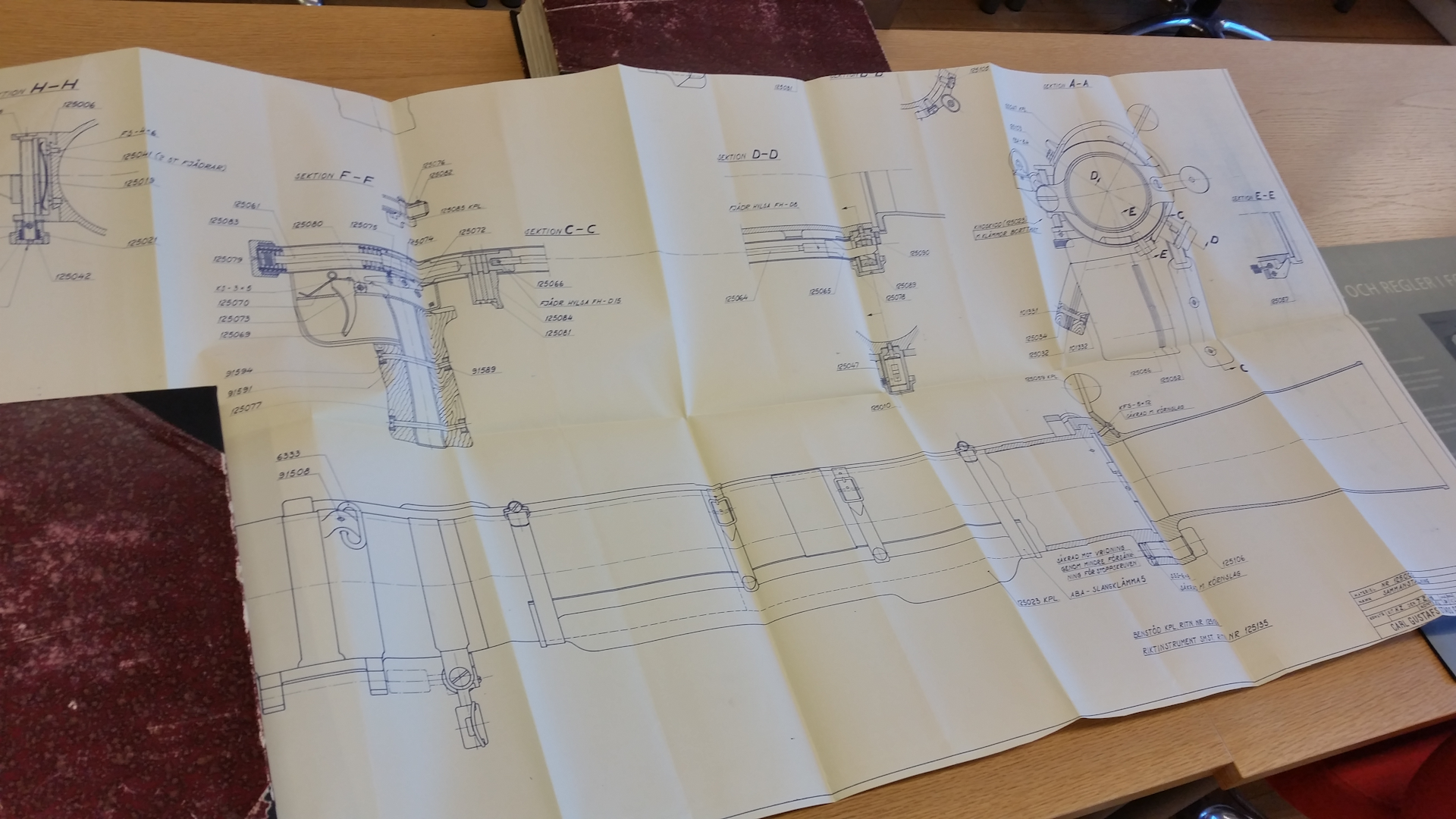
Carl Gustaf 84 mm recoilless rifle M1 blueprint, dated 7 February 1948.

The Carl Gustaf M1 was developed around 1946 by Hugo Abramson and Harald Jentzen at the Royal Swedish Army Materiel Administration (Kungliga Arméförvaltningens Tygavdelning) and produced at Carl Gustafs Stads Gevärsfaktori from where it derives its name. Development of the weapons system was preceded by a line of other recoilless developments between 1940 and 1946, featuring relatively small-bore ammunition:

- Carl Gustaf 20 mm recoilless rifle – 1942 (Swedish designation: 20 mm pansarvärnsgevär m/42)
- Carl Gustaf 37 mm recoilless rifle – 1943 (Swedish designation: 37 mm granatgevär fm/43)
- Carl Gustaf 47 mm recoilless rifle – 1945 (Swedish designation: 47 mm granatgevär fm/45)
- Carl Gustaf 84 mm recoilless rifle – 1948 (Swedish designation: 84 mm granatgevär m/48)

Despite advances in recoilless rifle technology introduced by the development family, it was quickly discovered that small-bore solid steel penetrators were obsolete for shoulder-fired antitank weapons, thus caliber was gradually increased to focus on multirole shell-type ammunition and the recent advances in shaped charge projectiles. By 1946 a caliber of 84 mm was decided upon (although larger calibers were proposed and tested).

The 84 mm weapon was first introduced into Swedish service in 1948 as the 8,4 cm granatgevär m/48, filling a similar role as the US Army's bazooka, British PIAT and German Panzerschreck, albeit with a higher focus on multirole and fire support than pure anti-tank warfare. Unlike the aforementioned weapons, however, the 84 mm Carl Gustaf used a rifled barrel for spin-stabilising its rounds, as opposed to fins used by the other systems. Sweden did, however, also adopt a true man-portable anti-tank system around the same time, the 8 cm raketgevär m/49 (fixed) and 8 cm raketgevär m/51 (foldable) rocket launchers, only featuring anti-tank ammunition.

The use of the recoilless firing system allowed the Gustaf to use ammunition containing considerably more propellant, firing its rounds at 290 m/s (950 ft/s), as opposed to about 105 m/s (340 ft/s) for the Panzerschreck and bazooka and about 75 m/s (250 ft/s) for the PIAT. The result was superior accuracy at longer ranges. The Gustaf can be used to attack larger stationary targets at up to 700 m (2,300 ft), but the relatively low speed of the projectile restricts attacks on moving targets to a range of 400 m (1,300 ft) or less.

The Gustaf was soon sold around the world and became one of the primary squad-level anti-tank weapons for many West European armies.

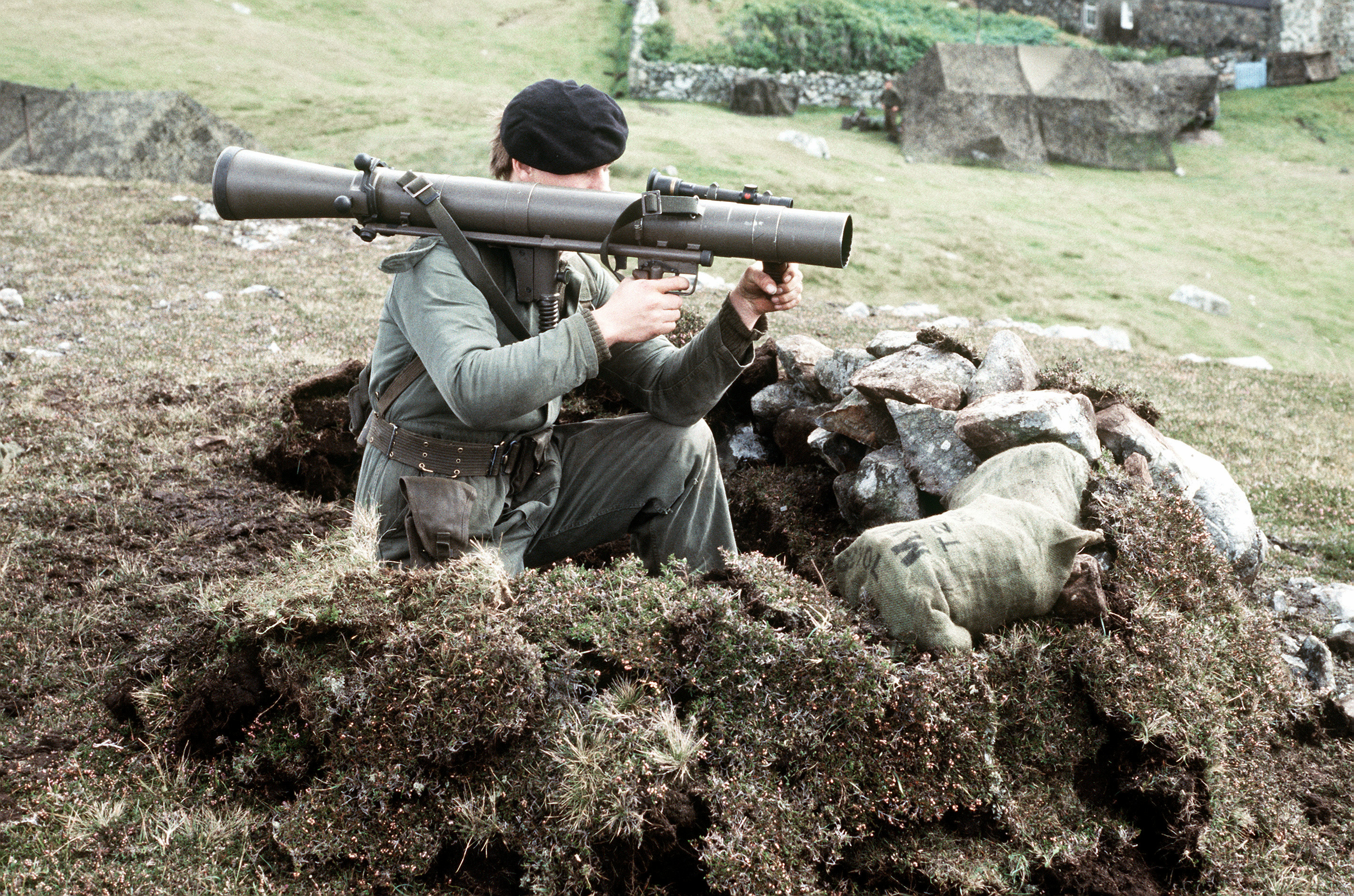
A Dutch Marine with an M2 during the NATO exercise Northern Wedding, 1978.

=== 1964 – M2 export ===
The Carl Gustaf M2 was introduced in 1964 as an improved, lighter and slightly shorter version of the original M1 for the export market. It quickly replaced the original version.

=== 1986 – M3 in Sweden (8,4 cm grg m/86) ===
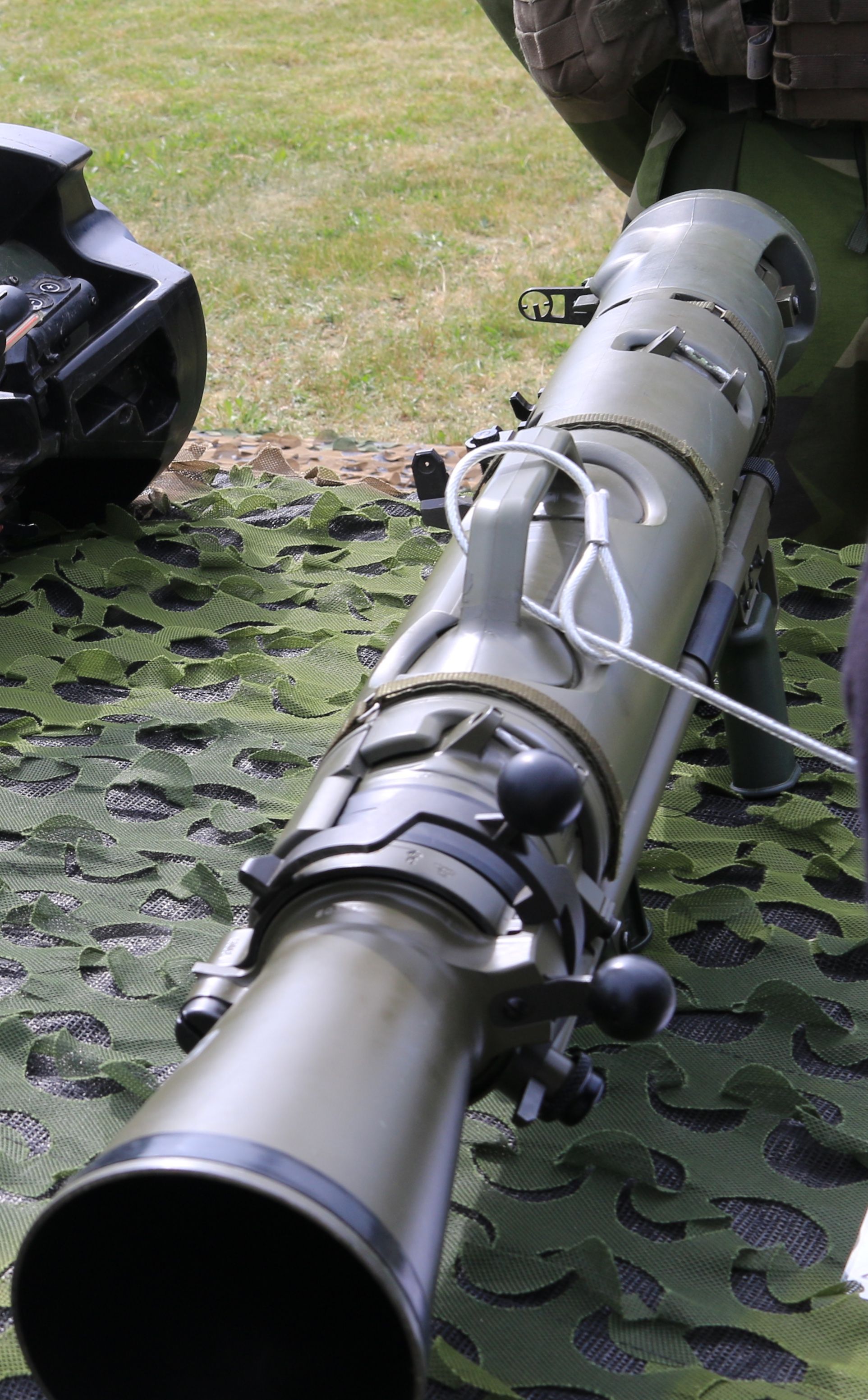
Swedish Carl Gustaf 84 mm recoilless rifle M3 (8,4 cm grg m/86).

The Carl Gustaf M3 started development in the 1980s and initially entered service with the Swedish Armed Forces as the 8,4 cm granatgevär m/86 ("8,4 cm grenade rifle", model 1986). While similar to the export M3, it shares some spare parts with the original 1948 M1 model. It reduced the weight even further by replacing the forged steel tube with a thin steel liner containing the rifling, strengthened by a carbon fibre outer sleeve. The external steel parts were also replaced with plastics and aluminium alloys.

=== 1991 – M3 export ===
The current export Carl-Gustaf M3 version was introduced in 1991. In recent years, the M3 has found new life in a variety of roles. The British Special Air Service, United States Army Special Forces and United States Army Rangers use M3s in bunker-busting and anti-vehicle roles. Many armies continue to use it as a viable anti-armour weapon, especially against 1950s- and 1960s-era tanks and other armoured vehicles still in use worldwide.

=== 2011 – M3 in US (M3 MAAWS) ===
In the late 1980s, the US Army sought to replace the M67 recoilless rifle in use by the 75th Ranger Regiment. Testing by the army's Benét Laboratories in 1993 determined that the Carl Gustaf M3 had a service lifetime more than four times the contractor's claims, which drew interest from the US Navy, and a joint services team moved forward with a purchase order under the US military designation MAAWS (Multi-Role Anti-Armor Anti-Personnel Weapon System) M3.

The MAAWS M3 is primarily used by United States Special Operations Command such as the Army Rangers, Army Special Forces, Marine Raiders, Navy SEALs, and JSOC operators. When used by the Rangers, the M3 may be referred to as the Ranger Anti-Armor Anti-Personnel Weapon System (RAAWS). Army Rangers found the M3 was best employed using a two-man team. One person would carry the launcher and be armed with a pistol for personal protection, and the other would carry 5–6 rounds of ammunition and act as a spotter for the gunner. Although the single-shot AT4 is lighter and can be carried by one person, a Gustaf team with the heavier recoilless rifle can reload and fire more rounds.

U.S. Army light infantry units began using the M3 MAAWS in Afghanistan in 2011, but only when commanders submitted operational needs statements for the weapon. The M3 became an official program of record in the conventional Army in 2014. Then in 2015, U.S. Army officials completed a conditional material release authorization, making the M3 Multi-Role Anti-Armor Anti-Personnel Weapon System an organic weapon system within each infantry platoon.

The standard optic for the M3 MAAWS is a telescopic sight featuring 3x magnification and a 12-degree field of view. To enhance the M3's targeting capabilities, the U.S. Army developed the Integrated Thermal Weapons Sight (ITWS) as an advanced system for the M3 MAAWS. The ITWS integrates the AN/PAS-13E Thermal Weapons Sight (TWS) and the AN/PSQ-23A Small Tactical Optical Rifle Mounted (STORM) Laser Range Finder. The thermal imaging capability of the AN/PAS-13E allows soldiers to detect and identify targets obscured by environmental factors such as darkness, fog, or dense vegetation, significantly improving situational awareness. While the AN/PSQ-23A STORM laser range finder ensures precise targeting by accurately calculating the distance to the target, thereby increasing hit probability. Despite these improvements, beginning in 2019, the U.S. Army opted to upgrade to the M3A1 MAAWS, which also has an advanced sight with an integrated laser range finder and a modular ballistic computer; however, the M3A1 offered further improvements over the ITWS, such as reduced weight and the ability to fire programmable ammunition.

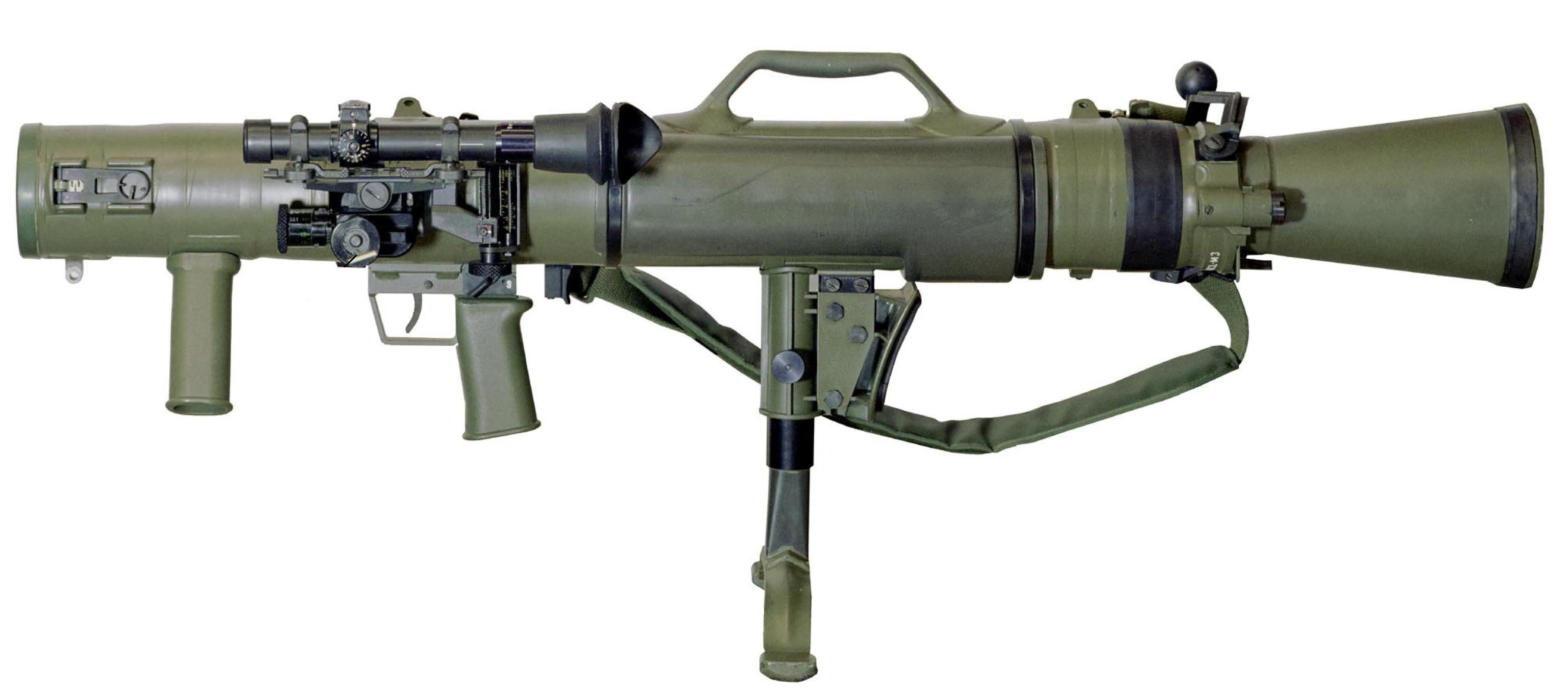
M3 MAAWS with telescopic sight (3x)

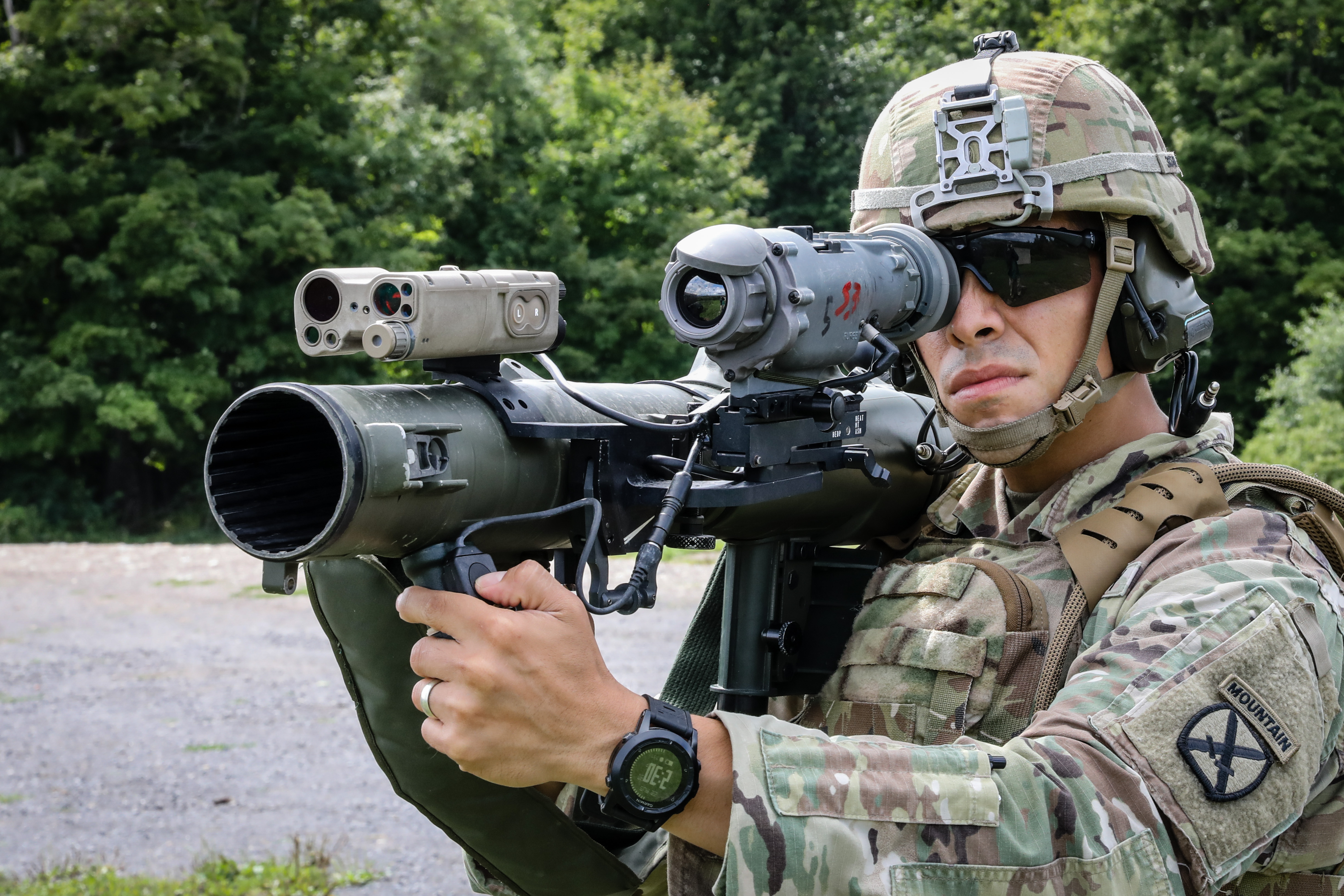
M3 MAAWS with ITWS

The M3 MAAWS fires the following ammunition:

- HE 441D RS: High explosive round with air burst capability, 800 6 mm steel pellets, and reduced sensitivity (RS) explosives
- HE 441E: High explosive with programmable air burst and 4000 3 mm tungsten pellets
- HEDP 502 RS: High-explosive dual-purpose round that has impact and delay modes, with reduced sensitivity (RS) explosives
- HEAT 551: High-explosive anti-tank – rocket-assisted projectile
- HEAT 551C RS: High-explosive anti-tank – rocket-assisted projectile, with reduced sensitivity (RS) explosives
- TP 552: Target practice – rocket-assisted projectile
- HEAT 751: High-explosive anti-tank – rocket-assisted projectile, with tandem warhead to defeat ERA
- ADM 401: Area defense munition – ADM 401 has 1100 flechettes and ADM 401B has ball bearings
- ASM 509: Anti-structure munition (Thermobaric), with impact and delay modes
- MT 756: Multi-target – rocket-assisted projectile, with a tandem warhead to defeat buildings, bunkers, and light armor
- SMOKE 469B: Smoke round
- ILLUM 545C: Illumination round
- TPT 141: Target practice, tracer round
- SCA 553B: Adapter to fire 7.62 mm tracer ammunition for training

=== 2014 – M4 export ===
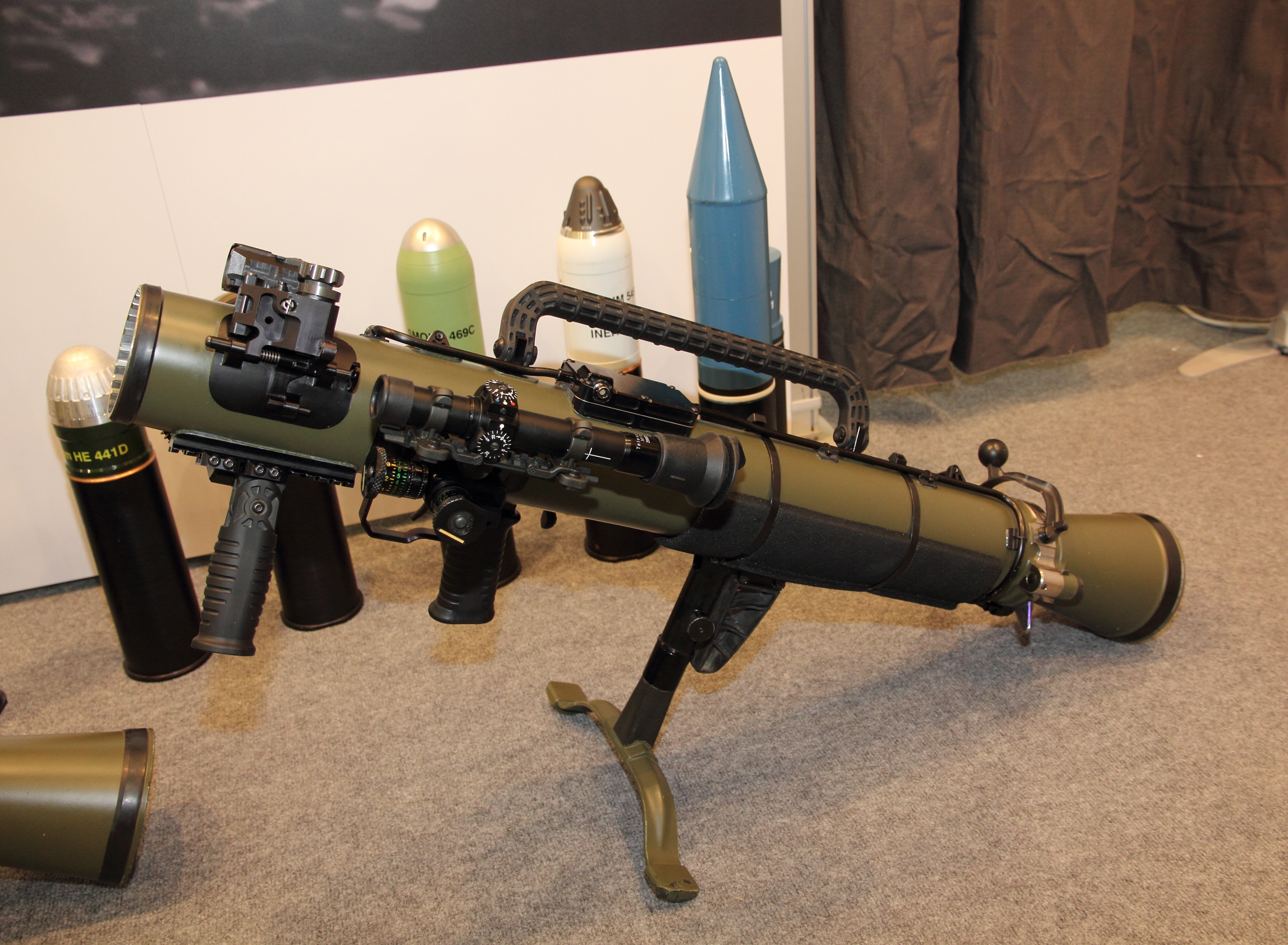
M4 variant

While the M3 MAAWS provided enhanced effectiveness over other launchers, its 9.5 kg (21 lb) weight burdened troops. On 28 March 2013, USSOCOM announced a call for sources to develop a kit to lighten the weapon and reduce overall length without affecting handling or ruggedness. Saab was already developing a weight-reduced version that demonstrated no decrease in performance, no increase in recoil, and nearly equivalent barrel life that could be ready for testing in 2014. Saab also developed a high-explosive round that has a direct fire range of 1,500 metres (4,900 ft) when using a fire control system.

Compared to the M3 MAAWS, the M4 is 3.4 kg (7.5 lb) lighter at 6.6 kg (15 lb), and shorter with a 950 mm (37 in) overall length. The shorter length was in response to the need to wield the weapon in urban terrain, and weight savings were achieved through using lighter components whenever possible including a carbon fibre tube with titanium liner, and a new venturi design. Other new features include a red-dot sight, a travel safety catch to allow the M4 to be carried while loaded, an adjustable shoulder rest and forward grip for improved ergonomics, a shot counter to keep track of how many rounds have been fired to manage the weapon's 1,000-round barrel life, double that of the M3, picatinny rails for grips and sight mounts, and a remote round management function so intelligent sights can communicate with programmable rounds.

In April 2019, a contract of SEK 168 million (US$18.1 million) was approved to supply the Australian Army with ammunition for the Carl-Gustaf M4 84 mm multipurpose weapon systems ordered by the service in September 2018.

=== 2017 – M4 in US (M3A1 MAAWS) ===
Following its reveal in 2014, the US Defense Department evaluated the M4 and in 2017 it was qualified for purchase by all US military services.

The US version of the M4 became known domestically as the M3A1 MAAWS. By using titanium, it is more than 2.7 kilograms (6 lb) lighter than the 2014 M4 and is also 64 millimetres (2.5 in) shorter. It has an improved carrying handle, shoulder padding and a sighting system that can be adjusted for better comfort. The M3A1's main sight is the Aimpoint FCS13RE, an advanced fire control system with an integrated laser rangefinder and a modular ballistic computer capable of programming high-explosive air-bursting ammunition (up to 1400 meters) and engaging moving targets (up to 600 meters). And in case of a malfunction with the primary sight, the M3A1 also has a backup reflex sight. The wiring harness provides a foregrip controller and programmable fuze setter for an interchangeable fire control system. The M3A1 uses the same family of ammunition as the M3. Testing with soldiers and SOF operators during live-fire exercises has demonstrated a hit rate of 90% or higher on both moving targets at 300 meters and stationary targets out to 850 meters, leading to a 60% increase in operational effectiveness compared to the older M3 MAAWS.

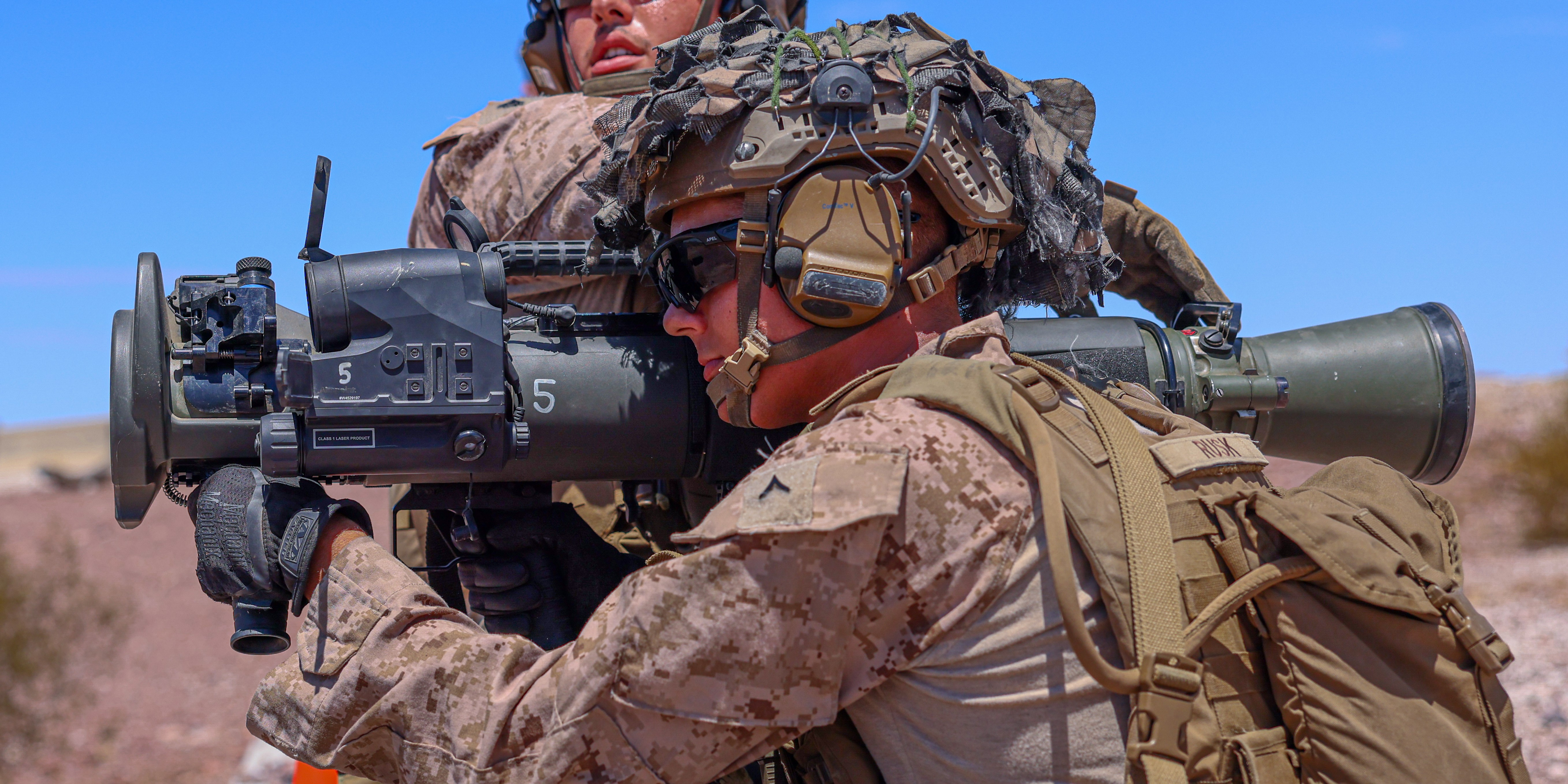
M3A1 MAAWS with the FCS13RE sight

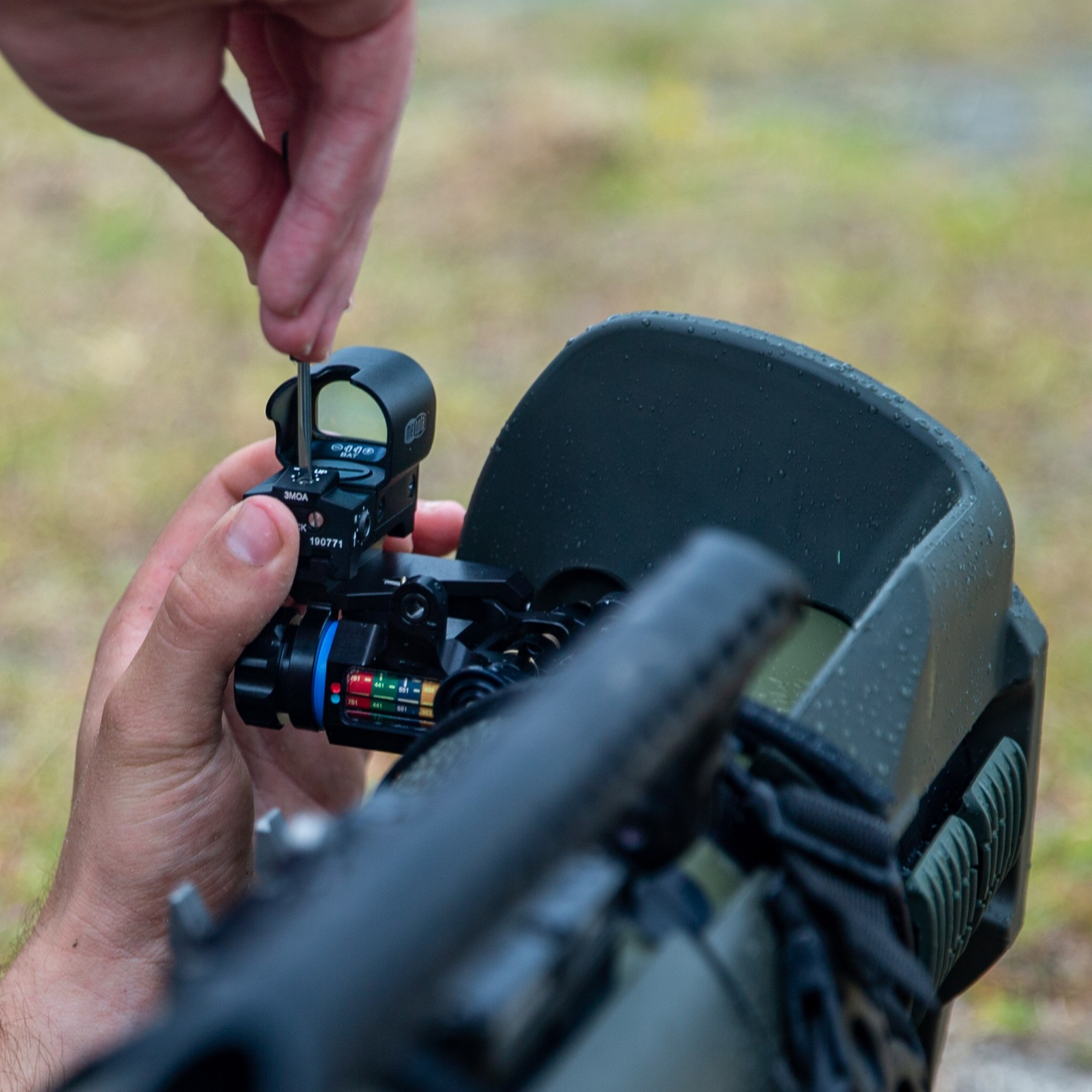
Backup reflex sight

M3A1 MAAWS firing

In 2017, the US Army ordered 1,111 units and the US Marine Corps planned to procure 1,200 to issue one to each infantry squad. The United States Marine Corps adopted the M3A1 to augment the Mk 153 SMAW in 2020 and it achieved Initial Operational Capability in 2021. In 2024, the US Army completed its fielding of the M3A1 Multi-Role Anti-Armor Anti-Personnel Weapon System (MAAWS).

In October 2024, Aimpoint secured a contract to provide its FCS 14 sight to the U.S. Marine Corps to be the primary fire control system on the M3A1 MAAWS. This advanced fire control system features a direct-view, Dynamic Universal Reflex Sight, which has an integrated laser rangefinder and ballistic computer, delivering precise aiming points adjusted for range, munition type, terrain, and environmental factors. Designed for versatility, it operates effectively in bright daylight, dawn, or dusk conditions and can integrate with helmet-mounted night vision devices like the AN/PVS-14 or AN/PVS-31. The system also includes the Dual Sensor Afocal (DSA) module—a removable thermal and day camera unit with variable magnification settings of 1×, 2×, 4×, and 8×, powered and controlled by the FCS—enhancing target detection and engagement capabilities.

=== 2018 – M4 in Sweden (8,4 cm grg m/18) ===
In 2018 the Swedish Defence Materiel Administration (Swedish: Försvarets materielverk, FMV) signed a contract with Saab to purchase the Carl Gustaf M4 as the 8,4 cm granatgevär m/18 ("8,4 cm grenade rifle", model 2018), often written without the "m/" to distinguish it from older m/18 (model 1918) systems (8,4 cm granatgevär 18, abbr. 8,4 cm grg 18). The M4 will replace the old M1 models (8,4 cm grg m/48) models still in service as some units are pushing 70+ years in service. The 8,4 cm grg 18 will feature an advanced laser rangefinder and will be acquired with new programmable ammunition (preliminary name HE 448), and a new, improved HEAT shell.

=== 2024 – M4 in India ===
Saab announced in September 2022 that it would establish a manufacturing facility to produce the Carl-Gustaf M4 weapons system in India. It will be the company's first facility producing the M4 system outside Sweden. The facility is expected to open in 2024 and will produce weapons for the Indian Armed Forces as well as export components to users worldwide. Saab received approval for 100% foreign direct investment and so will fully own the new manufacturing facility. The facility will also be India's first fully foreign-owned defence manufacturing facility. Construction of the facility started on 4 March 2024. Previous versions of the Carl Gustaf system have been in service with India since 1976.

In July 2026, the Indian Army issued a request for proposal (RFP) to procure 450 Carl Gustaf M4 variants manufactured in India. The deliveries are to be completed within 12 months of contract signing.

== Combat history ==
=== 1961–1964: Congo Crisis ===
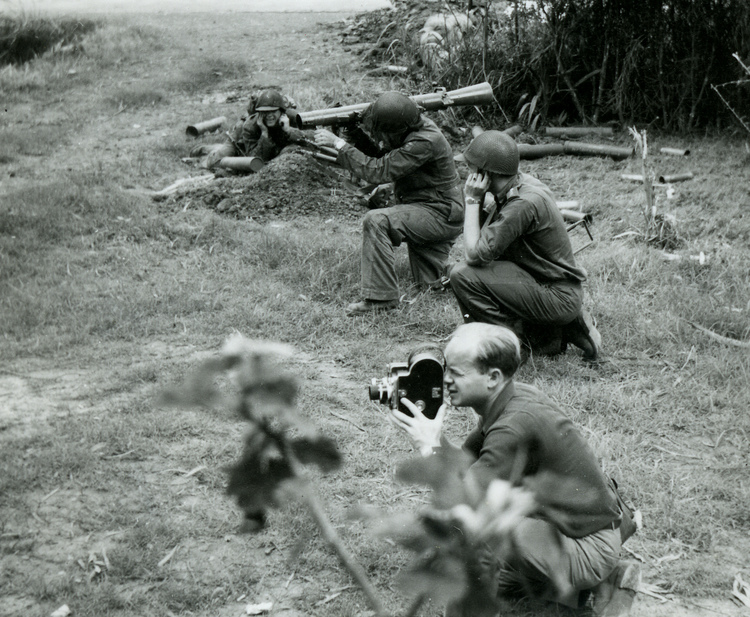
Swedish soldiers with the M1 variant, holding a roadblock during the Congo Crisis.

As part of the Congo Crisis 1960–1965, Swedish troops were sent to Congo as ONUC peacekeepers in mid- to late 1960. They initially lacked any heavy weaponry, but due to rising threat levels they received tgb m/42 KP infantry fighting vehicles and heavy weaponry such as the M1 Carl Gustaf in time for the violent fighting in Elisabethville in 1961.

The weapon proved its worth as a man-portable multi-purpose weapon and came to great use during the conflict. One famous incident happened on 14 September 1961, when Swedish soldier Torsten Stålnacke, then part of a M1 Carl-Gustaf squad, had his two squadmates shocked in connection with repelling a Gendarmerie armoured car attack on a refugee camp and their nearby depot, forcing him to operate the M1 on his own. Stålnacke advanced by himself against an enemy firing position, meanwhile managing to take out an enemy armoured car and a number of enemies before his jaw was shot to pieces. His chin hung down to his chest and he was suffocating. With his fingers he cleared the throat from bone fragments and pulled the tongue up, thereby able to breathe again. During the retreat, and with whistling bullets around him, Stålnacke kept his chin up with one hand and held the M1 with the other and managed with hand gestures and kicks get his two badly shocked comrades with him from the battlefield.

=== 1999: Sri Lanka and Kargill ===
India had been an enthusiastic adopter of the Carl Gustaf rifle, with the first M2 units entering service in 1974. The weapon first saw combat use with the Indian Army during peacekeeping operations in Sri Lanka and in counter-terrorist operations in Kashmir. Indian Army troops used the Carl Gustaf as an Infantry-held Bunker buster munition in the Kargill war of 1999. It was used significantly to engage stone bunkers, fortified positions and light armoured targets in the high-altitude mountains.

=== 2011–2021: War in Afghanistan ===
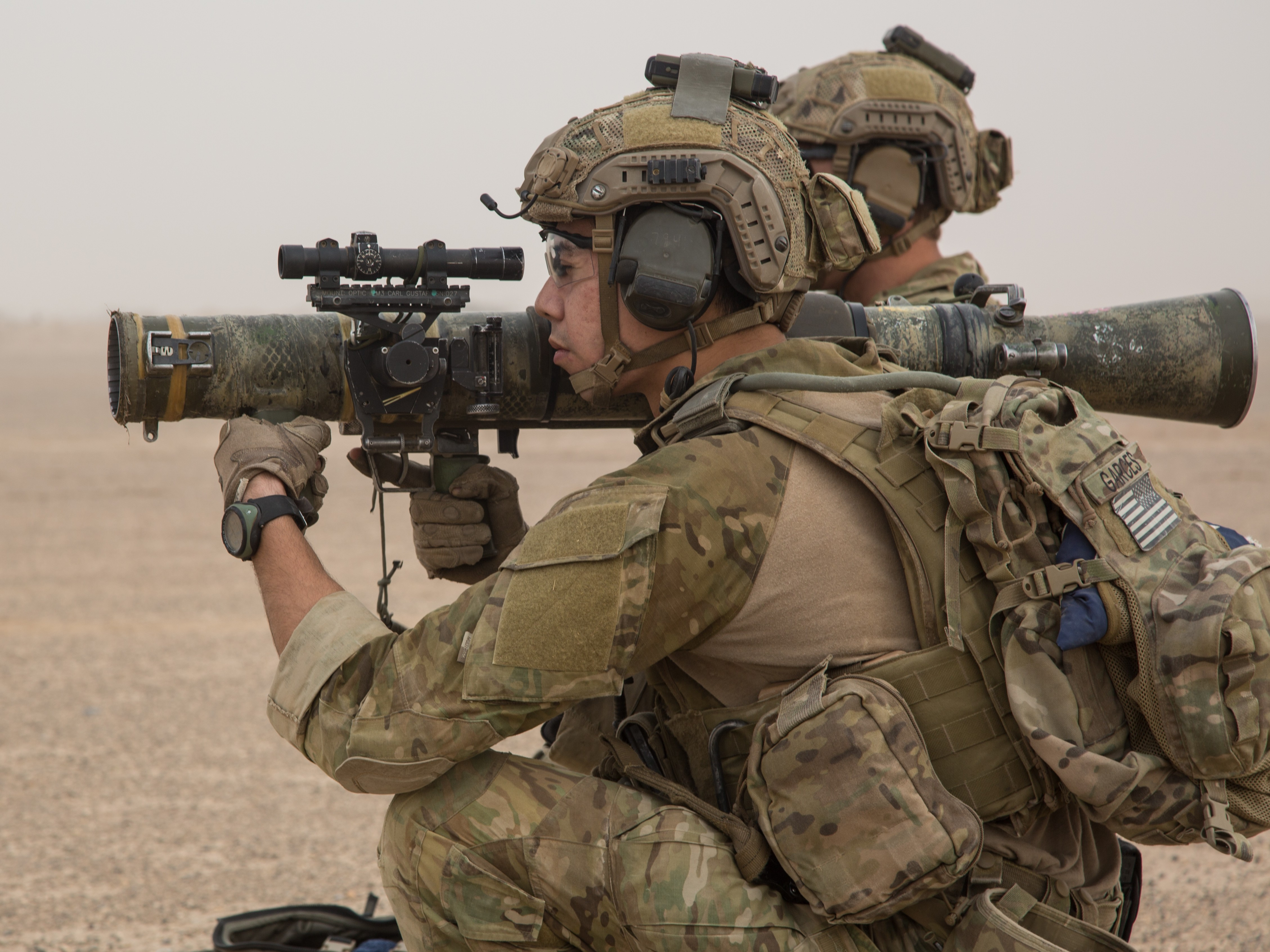
M3 MAAWS in Afghanistan

In November 2011, the US Army began ordering the M3 MAAWS for regular units deployed in Afghanistan. Soldiers were being engaged with RPGs at 900 meters, while their light weapons had effective ranges of 500–600 meters. The Gustaf allows airburst capability of troops in defilade out to 1,250 meters, and high-explosive use out to 1,300 meters.

In late 2012, the Army fielded 58 M3s and 1,500 rounds of ammunition to units deployed to Afghanistan to destroy enemy targets out to 1,000 meters. This was because RPG and machine gun teams could attack 900 meters away, while existing weaponry such as the M141 Bunker Defeat Munition, M72 LAW, M136 AT4, and MK153 SMAW have effective ranges of only 500 meters. The AT4 is lighter and cheaper but is made of reinforced fiberglass, while the M3's rifled metal/carbon fiber launch tube allows for reloading. Employing the 10 kg (22 lb) M3 is easier than the 24 kg (50 lb) FGM-148 Javelin with its launcher with missile and reusable command launch unit, is faster than waiting on mortars, and is cheaper than the Javelin and artillery shells for engaging targets in hard cover. Although Special Operations forces had been using the M3 since the early 1990s, light infantry unit commanders in Afghanistan had to submit operational needs statements to get the weapon. The M3 MAAWS saw service with units such as the 25th Infantry, 10th Mountain, and 82nd Airborne divisions in Afghanistan. Later, the M3 MAAWS saw service with many other units across the U.S. Army when it became an organic weapon system for each infantry platoon in 2015.

=== 2022–present: Russian invasion of Ukraine ===
Since 2022, the Carl Gustaf has been used in combat in the Russian invasion of Ukraine by Ukrainian forces, being used to target both tanks and infantry. According to Ukraine's Ministry of Defense, a Carl Gustaf was used to destroy the first Russian T-90M main battle tank of the war.

== Ammunition ==
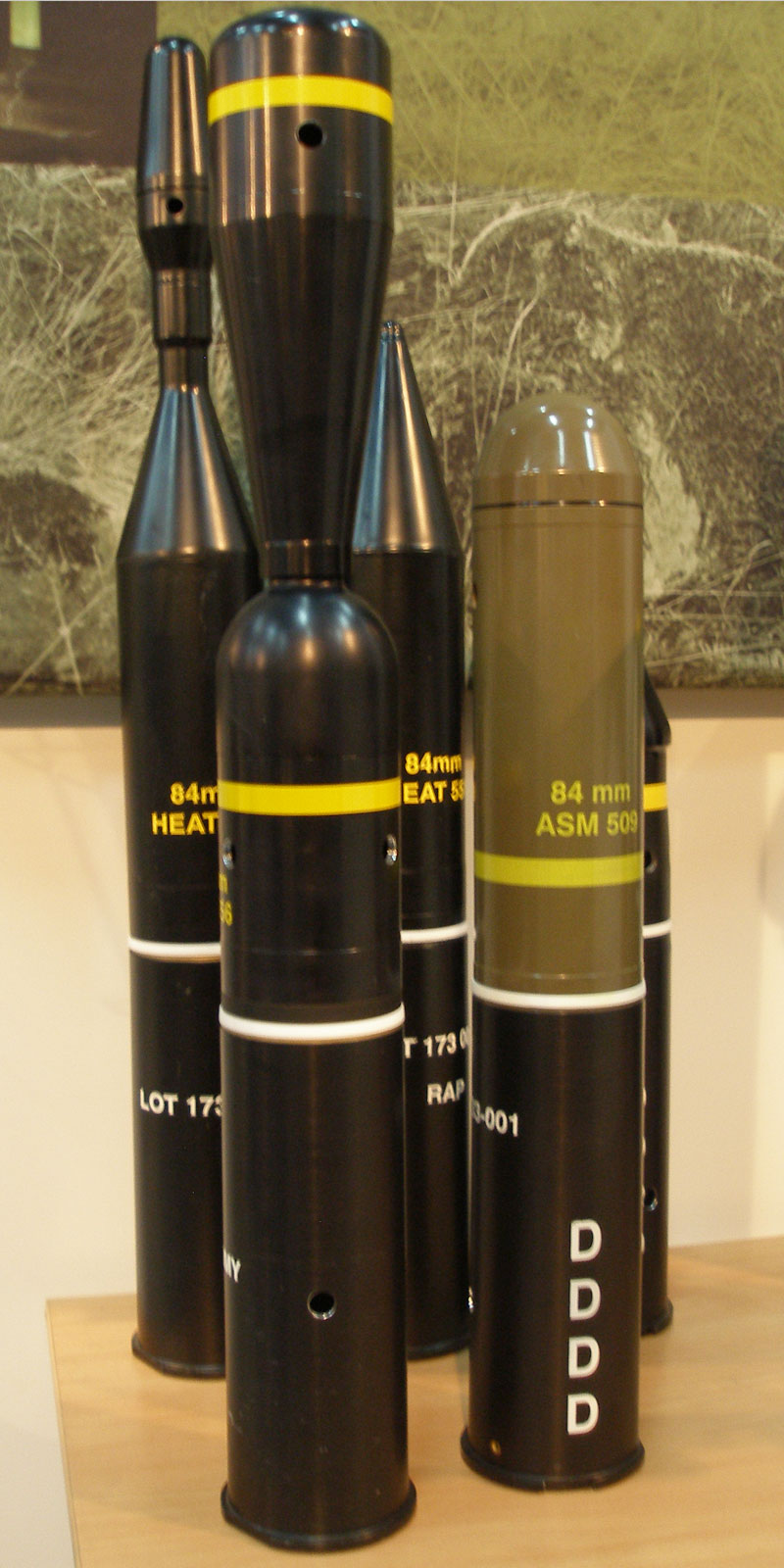
Carl Gustaf 8.4 cm recoilless rifle round ammunition on display

The Carl Gustaf 84 mm recoilless gun fires a 84 × 245 mm rimmed recoilless (84×245R RCL) cartridge with a blowout base for propellant gas ventilation. Ammunition initially consisted of high-explosive (HE), high-explosive anti-tank (HEAT), airburst (HE-TF) and smoke shells, not counting target-practice (TP) ammunition, but improvements to the ammunition family have been continual. While the older HEAT rounds are not particularly effective against modern tank armor, the weapon has found new life as a bunker-buster with a high-explosive dual-purpose (HEDP) round. Also, improved HEAT, high-explosive (HE), smoke and illumination (star shell or flare) ammunition is also available. For full effectiveness, illumination rounds must be fired at a very high angle, creating a danger for the gunner who can be burned from the backblast. For this reason, several armies have retired the illumination rounds, while the US Army requires that they be fired from a standing position. AEI Systems Ltd., a British defence products manufacturer, offers a variant of the platform dubbed the AE84-RCL designed to fire the M540/M550 line of 84×245 mm R ammunition manufactured in Belgium by Mecar.

The following are the Swedish manufacturer designations (other countries use similar terminology, replacing the FFV Försvarets Fabriksverk)

- FFV401 is an Area Defence Munition designed as a close-range anti-personnel round. It fires 1100 flechettes over a wide area.
- FFV441 is an HE round, useful in a "lobbed" trajectory to 1,000 m, which can be fused to either detonate on impact or as an airburst.
- FFV441B is an HE round with an effective range against personnel in the open of 1,100 m. The round arms after 20 to 70 m of flight, weighs 3.1 kg, and is fired at a muzzle velocity of 255 m/s.
- FFV448 is a programmable HE round with a Firebolt interface, 1500m effective range, and 2.7kg weight.
- FFV469 is a smoke round fired like the FFV441, with a range of about 1,300 m. The 3.1 kg round is also fired at 255 m/s.
- FFV502 is an HEDP round with the ability to be set to detonate on either impact or one-tenth second later. Effective range is 1,000 m against dispersed soft targets such as infantry in the open, 500 m against stationary targets and 300 m against moving targets. Minimum range is 15 to 40 m to arm the warhead. Penetration exceeds 150 mm of rolled homogeneous armour (RHA). Ammunition weight is 3.3 kg and muzzle velocity is 230 m/s.
- FFV509 is an ASM (Anti-Structure Munition), designed especially to destroy buildings and other types of urban constructions. The fuse has two modes: impact or a delayed function. The muzzle velocity is approximately 170 m/s and the maximum effective range is 300 meters.
- FFV545 is an illuminating star shell, fired up to 2,300 m maximum range, but with an effective envelope of 300 to 2,100 m. Suspended by parachute, the star shell burns for 30 seconds while producing 650,000 candela, providing a 400 to 500 m diameter area of illumination.
- FFV551 is the primary HEAT round and is a rocket-assisted projectile (RAP). Effective range is up to 700 m (400 m against moving targets) and penetration up to 400 mm of RHA. The ammunition weighs 3.2 kg and has a muzzle velocity of 255 m/s. After rocket ignition, the maximum velocity at 500 meters is 330 m/s.
- FFV551C RS is an evolution of FFV551, with improved Reduced Sensitivity (RS) munition properties and significant behind-armour effect. The ammunition weighs 3.5 kg and has a muzzle velocity of 245 m/s. After rocket ignition, the maximum velocity at 500 meters is 330 m/s. The maximum effective range is 700 meters and the armor penetration is about 400 mm.
- FFV552 is a practice round with the same ballistics as the 551.
- HEAT 655 CS (Confined Spaces) "high-explosive anti-tank (HEAT) round that can be fired by the 84 mm Carl Gustaf recoilless weapon from within small enclosures."
- FFV751 is a tandem-warhead HEAT round with an effective range of 500 m and ability to penetrate more than 500 mm of armour. The round weighs 3.8 kg and has a muzzle velocity of 210m/s, while maximum velocity after rocket ignition is 336m/s.
- FFV756 is an MT (Multi Target) ammunition, designed for combat in built-up areas and for incapacitating an enemy under cover inside a building or some type of fortification. The MT 756 uses a tandem charge.
- HEAT 758 is a new tandem warhead HEAT munition introduced in 2026, with penetration reaching up to 700 mm of armour. It is specifically designed against explosive reactive armour (ERA).
- Guided Multipurpose Munition (GMM) is a laser guided projectile developed between Saab and Raytheon, featuring a multipurpose warhead capable of defeating bunkers and moving light armored vehicles at a range of 2,500 m and can be fired from enclosed spaces.

== Comparison to similar weapons ==
Comparison
Origin	Weapon	Diameter (mm)	Muzzle velocity (m/s)	HEAT Warhead (kg)		Armor penetration (est.) (mm)	Effective range (m)	Sight
Sweden	M3-E1 Carl Gustaf	84	310	1	.70	400	450	2×
United States	M67 recoilless rifle	90	213	3	.06	350	400	3×
France	LRAC F1	89	300	2	.20	400	600	N/A
Soviet Union	RPG-7 with PG-7VS grenade	72	140	2	.0	400	500	2.7×
Israel	B-300	82	280	3	.0	400	400	N/A
China	PF-98	120	310	7	.91	800	800	4×
Sweden	Pansarvärnspjäs 1110	90	700	10		800	900	N/A

== Users ==
Map with Carl Gustaf operators in blue and former operators in red

The following is a list of countries and regions which use the Carl Gustaf in their armed forces, with the variant(s) included when confirmed in sources.

- Argentina
- Australia: Use of the M2 has been succeeded by the M3, with the M4 on order as of 2010.
- Austria
- Bangladesh
- Belgium
- Belize
- Botswana
- Brazil
- Burkina Faso
- Canada M4 variant ordered in May 2025.
- Colombia: M3 variant
- Chile
- Czech Republic
- Denmark: Variants are officially called M/65, M/79 and M/85 based on their year of introduction. The M4 was ordered for delivery in 2022. All variants have commonly been referred to as Dysekanon (lit. nozzle cannon) in the Danish army.
- Estonia: M3, M4 variants. Previously used M2s which were phased out with the purchase of 250 M4s in 2021.
- Germany The Bundeswehr maintains a small number of M2s for battlefield illumination.
- Ghana
- Greece
- Hungary: M4
- Honduras
- India: The country's Defence Research and Development Organisation (DRDO) developed a prototype of a lighter version using composites.
- Indonesia: Used by the Kopaska and Kopassus special forces.
- Ireland: Issued to specialist units such as the Army Ranger Wing (ARW).
- Israel
- Italy Planned 2,720 M-4 launchers and 122,000 projectiles for 426 M€, between 2022 and 2032
- Japan: M2 called "84 mm Recoilless Rifle", M3 called "multi-purpose gun" (多用途ガン)'
- Kenya
- Kurdistan: The standing military had 43 launchers and +1,000 projectiles as of 2015.
- Kuwait
- Latvia: M4 on order.
- Libya
- Lithuania: M2, M3 and M4.
- Malaysia: M2 and M3 in service. 110 units of M4 variant ordered in 2021.
- Myanmar: Used by divisional heavy weapon companies for counter-insurgency campaigns. Clones made as BA-84(MA-84) MK and MK-II.
- Nepal
- New Zealand M3 (M4 on order)
- Nigeria
- Norway: M2, M3, M4
- Pakistan: M2, M3
- Poland: Used by special forces. In 2024, over 6,000 M4 variants were ordered with large stocks of ammunition.
- Portugal: M2 and M3 variants used by Portuguese Army and Portuguese Marine Corps.
- Saudi Arabia
- Serbia
- Sierra Leone
- Slovakia: M3 and early adopter of M4 variant, which became operational in July 2017.
- Slovenia: M4 version in use since 2020.
- Sweden: M2 and M3, to be replaced with M4 between 2020 and 2023.
- Thailand
- Ukraine: 100 units with 2,000 rounds of ammunition donated by the Government of Canada due to the Russo-Ukrainian War.
- United Arab Emirates
- United Kingdom: M2 variant was used as the L14A1 Infantry Anti-Tank Gun or Medium Anti-Tank Weapon from the 1960s until the early 1990s, when it was replaced by LAW 80. Procurement of M4 variant was announced in 2023 to replenish munitions granted to Ukraine.
- United States: Used by USSOCOM, US Army Ranger battalions, and some regular US Army infantry units in the War in Afghanistan. In February 2014, the M3 MAAWS became standard-issue in army light infantry units.
- Venezuela
- Zambia

=== Former users ===
- Netherlands: The M2 was in service with the Royal Netherlands Army since 1964 and also with the Dutch Marine Corps, known as the Terugstootloze vuurmond (TLV, lit. recoilless gun) 84 mm, Carl Gustaf M-2. It was replaced by the Panzerfaust 3.
- Singapore: Replaced by MATADOR in 2013.

=== Non-state actors ===
- Tamil Eelam: Used by the Tamil Tigers during the Final Eelam War.

== Wars ==
- Congo Crisis
- Falklands War
- Lebanese Civil War
- Gulf War
- Kargil War
- Chiapas conflict
- War in Afghanistan (2001–2021)
- Iraq War
- Mexican drug war
- Eelam War IV
- First Libyan Civil War
- 2013 Lahad Datu standoff
- War in Iraq (2013-2017)
- Russian invasion of Ukraine
- 2025 Cambodia-Thailand conflict

== See also ==
- 55 S 55 (Finland, 1955, 55 mm, man-portable)
- M40 recoilless rifle (United States, 1955, 105 mm, tripod mounted)
- RPG-2 (USSR, 1954, man-portable)
- B-10 recoilless rifle (USSR, 1954, 82 mm, tripod mounted)
