= Carl Gustaf 20 mm recoilless rifle =

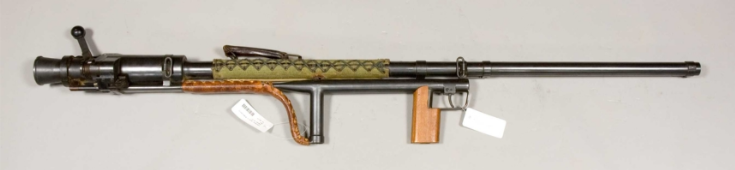
- 20 mm pansarvärnsgevär m/42
- Type: Man-portable anti-tank system/anti-tank rifle
- Place of origin: Sweden

Service history
- In service: 1942–???
- Used by: See Users
- Wars: The Troubles

Production history
- Designed: M1: 1940–1942
- Produced: 1942–1944
- No. built: 1000

Specifications
- Mass: 11 kg (24 lb)
- Length: 1,450 mm (57 in)
- Crew: Two (gunner and loader), could be used by a single operator
- Cartridge: 20×180mmR Bofors
- Caliber: 20 mm
- Action: recoilless, single-shot
- Muzzle velocity: 900–950 m/s (3,000–3,100 ft/s)
- Effective firing range: iron sights are calibrated to 300 meters
- Maximum firing range: Ammunition-dependent, usually 400 to 1,000 m (1,300 to 3,300 ft)
- Feed system: Hinged breech
- Sights: Open (iron) sights; Meopta ZF-4 optical sight

The Carl Gustaf 20 mm recoilless rifle, service name 20 mm pansarvärnsgevär m/42 (20 mm pvg m/42), meaning "20 mm antitank rifle model 1942", was the first recoilless rifle produced by Carl Gustafs Stads Gevärsfaktori. The weapon had a penetration of just over 4 cm RHA with its standard solid shot armour piercing projectile and quickly became obsolete against modern armour, leading to the development of higher caliber recoilless guns, eventually resulting in the Carl Gustaf 84 mm recoilless rifle in 1948.

== Design ==
The Carl Gustaf 20 mm pvg m/42 fired the 20×180mm rimmed cartridge which had two cutouts in the bottom of the casing. A seal covered these cutouts and when the cartridge was discharged, this seal was blown out to the back of the weapon, expelling some of the propellant gases rearward and counteracting the effects of recoil produced by the projectile accelerating down the barrel. The breech plate had to be replaced after firing twenty rounds of armor-piercing ammunition or after forty rounds of practice on high-explosive.

Unlike comparable anti-tank rifles of the era the 20 mm pvg m/42 was shipped with both high-explosive and armor-piercing projectiles. The AP round was tungsten-cored and had a tracer variant known as the slpprj m/42. The impact-fuzed HE projectile was known as the sgr m/43. The 20 mm pvg m/42 being a recoilless rifle was also much lighter and more portable than contemporary 20 mm anti-tank rifles. The 20 mm pvg m/42 was equipped with iron sights ranged to 300 metres and a detachable Meopta ZF-4 optical sight.

The 20 mm pvg m/42 was the world's first shoulder-fired recoil-less weapon, and laid the ground work for the development of the more well-known Carl Gustaf 8.4cm recoilless rifle, which continues to see widespread military service.

== Service history ==
By 1942 the armor penetration of the 20 mm pvg m/42 and anti-tank rifles was generally inadequate in the face of improvements in tank armor. Despite this, orders for 3,219 ATRs were placed, with deliveries between August 1942 and July 1944. The first 500 were faulty, and used only for training until they were repaired. By the end of World War II only 1,000 had been delivered.

The Provisional Irish Republican Army acquired at least one 20 mm pvg m/42 recoilless rifle and first used the weapon in the summer of 1983, carrying out a number of attacks on British Army and Royal Ulster Constabulary fortified observation posts and armored vehicles in Belfast.

== Users ==
- Sweden
- Provisional Irish Republican Army

== Carl Gustaf recoilless weapon family ==
- Carl Gustaf 20 mm recoilless rifle – 1942
- Carl Gustaf 37 mm recoilless rifle – 1943
- Carl Gustaf 47 mm recoilless rifle – 1945
- Carl Gustaf 84 mm recoilless rifle – 1948

== See also ==
- 120 mm BAT recoilless rifle
