= Heavy weapons platoon =

Type of military unit

Heavy weapons platoon (HWP) is a term from military science which refers to an infantry platoon equipped with machine guns, mortars, rocket-propelled grenades, flamethrowers, grenade launchers, anti-tank weapons, or any other weapons that are portable but heavier than a single infantryman can reasonably transport and operate by themselves for combat, generally a crew-served weapon. Heavy weapons platoons are grouped into a weapons company or maneuver support company, which focuses on moving and using heavy weapons to support light infantry rifle companies armed with standard-issue small arms.

== British Army ==
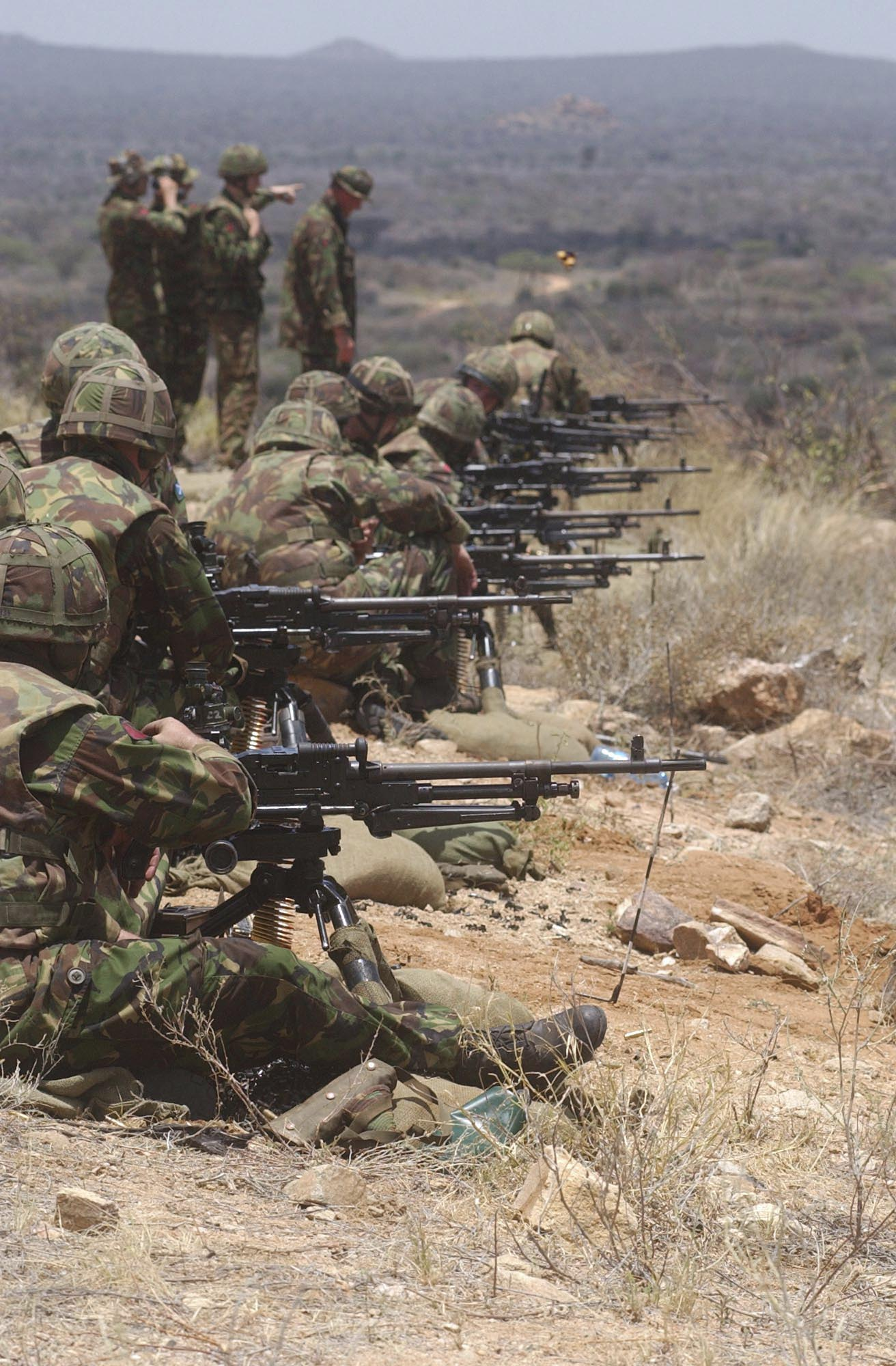
Machine Gun platoon of Support Company 1st Battalion Worcestershire and Sherwood Foresters Regiment during exercise 'Grand Prix' in Kenya

In the British Army, the manoeuvre support company possesses an Anti-Tank platoon armed with 8 Javelin missile launchers, a reconnaissance platoon, a mortar platoon (with eight 81 mm mortars), an assault pioneer platoon, and, in the case of Light Role battalions, a machine gun platoon (with nine FN MAG general purpose machine guns).

== U.S. Army regulations ==
According to U.S. Army regulations 320-5 (AR 320–5) "heavy weapons" are all "weapons such as mortars, howitzers, guns, heavy machineguns and recoilless rifles which are usually part of infantry equipment."

== Size ==
As with most support units in any army, the size of a weapons platoon is generally smaller than that of its light infantry equivalent. For example, a typical light infantry platoon consists of 30 to 40 men divided in three or four squads (or sections) of 9–13 men, whereas a weapons platoon substitutes the squads with smaller groups for mortar teams, machine gun crews, anti-tank teams etc. Some platoons also include the assault element of a company. A company's weapons platoon will carry portable support weapons by sections, but also include a fast-attack light-infantry specialist squad of soldiers trained for breaching, raiding, and close combat.

A heavy weapon platoon is generally used as a support group to a number of other platoons in the immediate command area/zone in question. A ratio of one heavy platoon to three basic infantry platoons is the accepted number, anything above or below this may result in a specialised "company" such as a rifle company, or a long-range support company. The addition of a HWP can greatly increase the chances of victory in a combat zone, due to the unique specialist abilities the soldiers in that group can offer to the company.

In more modern times, the application of heavy weapon support groups has increased. The ability to provide covering fire, and the suppression tactics of the heavy platoon mean that it is better equipped to give cover, and forms a vital component to the overall success, supporting the bulk of the company as they advance. The advancement in troop transportation has lessened the problems of re-locating heavy weaponry and large quantities of ammunition.

== Example: US Army Weapons Platoon in WW2 ==
A February 1944 Table of organization and equipment show the following details about a US Army WW2 weapons platoon:

- A Rifle Company was made up of 3 Rifle Platoons and 1 Weapons Platoon.
- A Weapons Platoon was made up of a six-man Headquarters, a Mortar Section and a Light Machine Gun Section.
- The Platoon Headquarters was armed with a single .50 caliber M2 Browning heavy machine gun
- The Mortar Section was made up of a two-man HQ and three five-man squads, each squad armed with a single 60mm M2 mortar - a total of 17 men and 3 Mortars.
- The Light Machine Gun Section was made up of a two-man HQ and two five-man squads, each squad armed with a single .30 caliber M1919 Browning machine gun - a total of 12 men and 2 machine guns.
- A full-strength Weapons platoon had 35 men in total with one officer. Apart from the special weapons, 16 of these men were issued with the light M1 carbine and 9 being issued the heavier M1 Garand rifle. 5 of those armed with the M1 rifle were also issued with the M7 grenade launcher. The remaining 10 men were armed with the M1911 pistol as their sidearm.
