= Crew-served weapon =

Type of weapons system

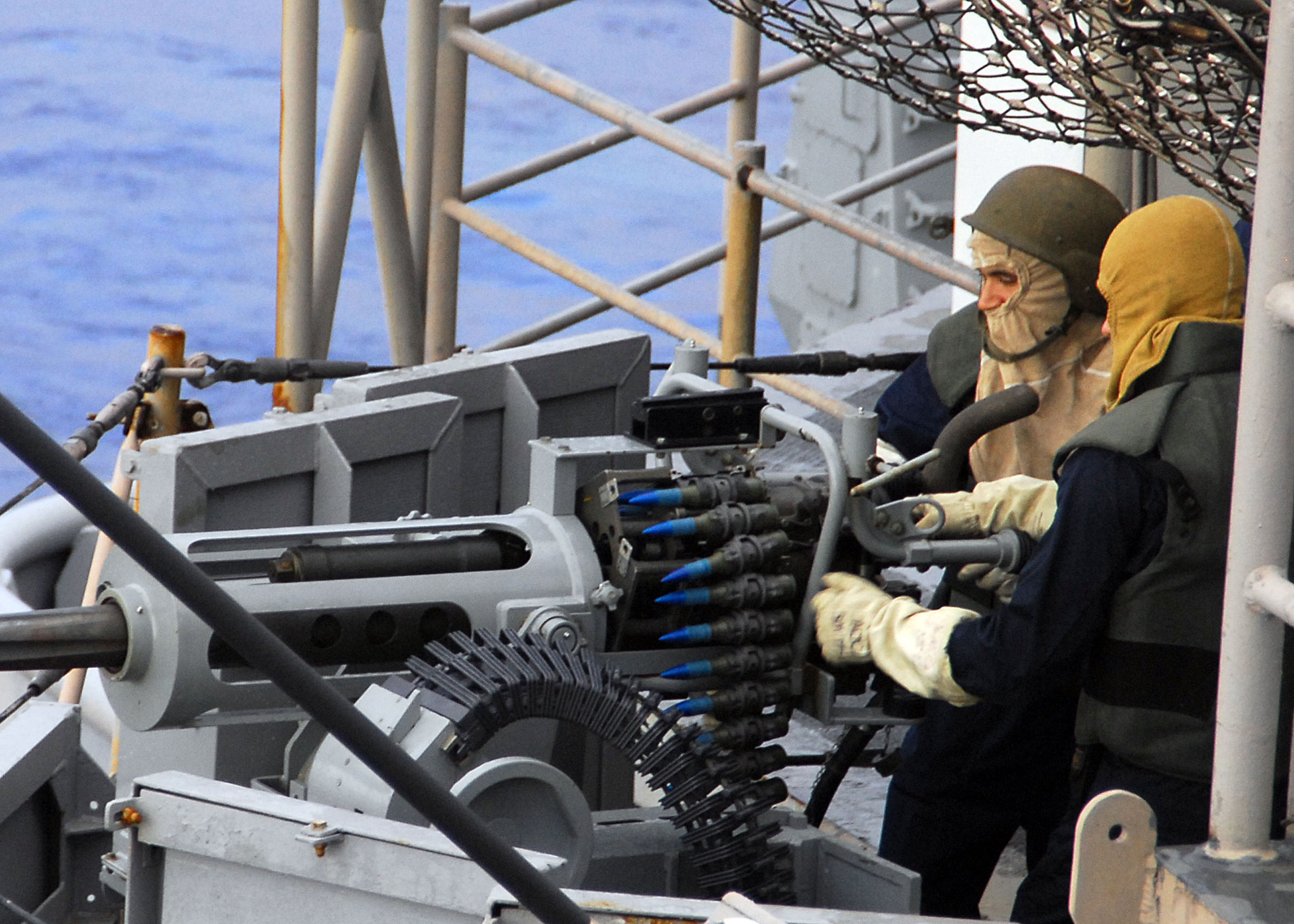
Sailors prepare a 25-mm crew-served weapon before a live-fire exercise aboard the amphibious assault ship USS Essex.

A crew-served weapon is any weapon system that is issued to a crew of two or more individuals performing the same or separate tasks to run at maximum operational efficiency, as opposed to an individual-service weapon, which only requires one person to run at maximum operational efficiency. The weight and bulk of the system often also requires multiple people for transportation.

Crew-served weapons operated by infantry include sniper rifles, anti-materiel rifles, machine guns, automatic grenade launchers, mortars, anti-tank guns, anti-aircraft guns, recoilless rifles, shoulder-launched missile weapons, and static anti-tank and anti-aircraft missiles.

== See also ==
- Heavy weapons platoon
- Small arms for weapons used by individuals
- List of crew-served weapons of the U.S. Armed Forces
