= AK-47 =

Soviet 7.62×39mm assault rifle

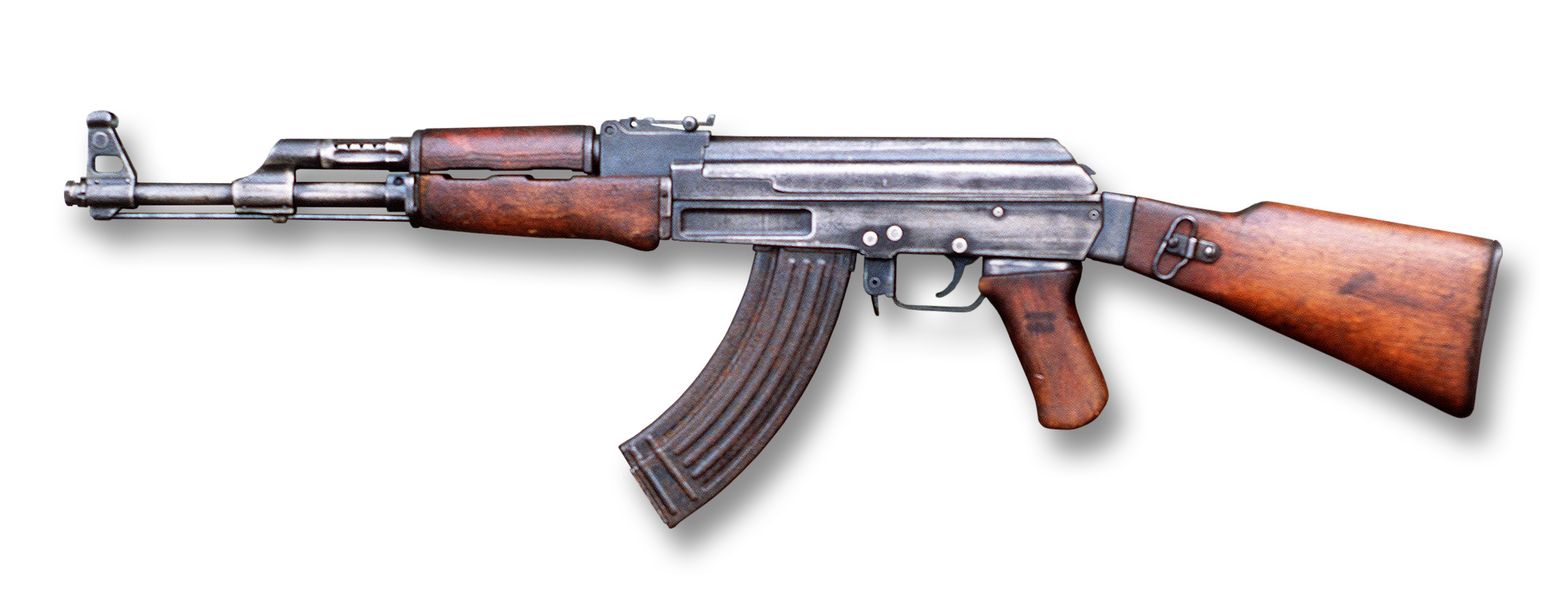
- AK-47 Type 2A
- Type: Assault rifle
- Place of origin: Soviet Union

Service history
- In service: 1949–1974 (Soviet Union); 1949–present (other countries)
- Used by: See Users
- Wars: See Conflicts

Production history
- Designer: Mikhail Kalashnikov
- Designed: 1947; 79 years ago
- Manufacturer: Fabryka Broni Radom, Kalashnikov Concern, Norinco, and Zastava Arms
- Produced: 1948–present
- No. built: ~75 million ~100 million Kalashnikov–style rifles
- Variants: See Variants

Specifications (AK-47 with Type 3 receiver)
- Mass: Without magazine: 3.47 kg (7.7 lb); Magazine, empty: 0.43 kg (0.95 lb) (early issue); 0.33 kg (0.73 lb) (steel); 0.25 kg (0.55 lb) (plastic); 0.17 kg (0.37 lb) (light alloy)
- Length: Fixed wooden stock: 880 mm (35 in); 875 mm (34.4 in) (folding stock extended); 645 mm (25.4 in) (stock folded)
- Barrel length: Overall length: 415 mm (16.3 in); Rifled bore length: 369 mm (14.5 in)
- Cartridge: 7.62×39mm
- Action: Gas-operated, long-stroke piston, closed rotating bolt
- Rate of fire: Cyclic rate: 600 rounds/min Practical rate: Semi-automatic: 40 rounds/min Bursts / fully automatic: 100 rounds/min
- Muzzle velocity: 715 m/s (2,350 ft/s)
- Effective firing range: 350 m (380 yd)
- Feed system: 20-round, 30-round, 50-round detachable box magazine, 40-round, 75-round drum magazines also available
- Sights: 100–800 m adjustable iron sights Sight radius: 378 mm (14.9 in)

The AK-47, full name Avtomat Kalashnikova 1947, officially known as the Avtomat Kalashnikova (Russian: Автомат Калашникова, lit. 'Kalashnikov's automatic'; also known as the Kalashnikov or just AK), is an assault rifle chambered for the 7.62×39mm cartridge. Developed in the Soviet Union by Russian small-arms designer Mikhail Kalashnikov, it is the originating firearm of the Kalashnikov (or "AK") family of rifles. After more than seven decades since its creation, the AK-47 model and its variants remain one of the most popular and widely used firearms in the world.

Design work on the AK-47 began in 1945. It was presented for official military trials in 1947, and, in 1948, the fixed-stock version was introduced into active service for selected units of the Soviet Army. In early 1949, the AK was officially accepted by the Soviet Armed Forces and used by the majority of the member states of the Warsaw Pact.

The model and its variants owe their global popularity to their reliability under harsh conditions, low production cost (compared to contemporary weapons), availability in virtually every geographic region, and ease of use. The AK has been manufactured in many countries and has seen service with armed forces as well as irregular forces and insurgencies throughout the world. As of 2004, "of the estimated 500 million firearms worldwide, approximately 100 million belong to the Kalashnikov family, three-quarters of which are AK-47s". The model is the basis for the development of many other types of individual, crew-served, and specialized firearms.

== History ==
=== Origins ===
During World War II, the Sturmgewehr 44 rifle used by German forces made a deep impression on their Soviet counterparts. The select-fire rifle was chambered for a new intermediate cartridge, the 7.92×33mm Kurz, and combined the firepower of a submachine gun with the range and accuracy of a rifle. On 15 July 1943, an earlier model of the Sturmgewehr was demonstrated before the People's Commissariat of Arms of the USSR. The Soviets were impressed with the weapon and immediately set about developing an intermediate caliber fully automatic rifle of their own, to replace the PPSh-41 submachine guns and outdated Mosin–Nagant bolt-action rifles that armed most of the Soviet Army.

The Soviets soon developed the 7.62×39mm M43 cartridge, used in the semi-automatic SKS carbine and the RPD light machine gun. Shortly after World War II, the Soviets developed the AK-47 rifle, which quickly replaced the SKS in Soviet service. Introduced in 1959, the AKM is a lighter stamped steel version and the most ubiquitous variant of the entire AK series of firearms. In the 1960s, the Soviets introduced the RPK light machine gun, an AK-type weapon with a stronger receiver, a longer heavy barrel, and a bipod, that eventually replaced the RPD light machine gun.

=== Concept ===
Mikhail Kalashnikov began his career as a weapon designer in 1941 while recuperating from a shoulder wound that he received during the Battle of Bryansk. Kalashnikov himself stated..."I was in the hospital, and a soldier in the bed beside me asked: 'Why do our soldiers have only one rifle for two or three of our men when the Germans have automatics?' So I designed one. I was a soldier, and I created a machine gun for a soldier. It was called an Avtomat Kalashnikova, the automatic weapon of Kalashnikov—AK—and it carried the year of its first manufacture, 1947."

The AK-47 is best described as a hybrid of previous rifle technology innovations. "Kalashnikov decided to design an automatic rifle combining the best features of the American M1 Garand and the German StG 44." Kalashnikov's team had access to these weapons and did not need to "reinvent the wheel". Kalashnikov himself observed: "A lot of Russian Army soldiers ask me how one can become a constructor, and how new weaponry is designed. These are very difficult questions. Each designer seems to have his own paths, his own successes and failures. But one thing is clear: before attempting to create something new, it is vital to have a good appreciation of everything that already exists in this field. I myself have had many experiences confirming this to be so."

Some claimed that Kalashnikov copied designs like Bulkin's TKB-415 or Simonov's AVS-31.

=== Early designs ===
Kalashnikov started work on a submachine gun design in 1942 and a light machine gun design in 1943. Early in 1944, Kalashnikov was given some 7.62×39mm M43 cartridges and informed that other designers were working on weapons for this new Soviet small-arms cartridge. It was suggested that a new weapon might well lead to greater things. He then undertook work on the new rifle. In 1944, he entered a design competition with this new 7.62×39mm, semi-automatic, gas-operated, long-stroke piston carbine, strongly influenced by the American M1 Garand. The new rifle was in the same class as the SKS-45 carbine, with a fixed magazine and gas tube above the barrel. However, the new Kalashnikov design lost out to a Simonov design.

In 1946, a new design competition was initiated to develop a new rifle. Kalashnikov submitted a gas-operated rifle with a short-stroke gas piston above the barrel, a breechblock mechanism similar to his 1944 carbine, and a curved 30-round magazine. Kalashnikov's rifles, the AK-1 (with a milled receiver) and AK-2 (with a stamped receiver) proved to be reliable weapons and were accepted to a second round of competition along with other designs.

These prototypes (also known as the AK-46) had a rotating bolt, a two-part receiver with separate trigger unit housing, dual controls (separate safety and fire selector switches), and a non-reciprocating charging handle located on the left side of the weapon. This design had many similarities to the StG 44(though StG 44 had closed tilting bolt). In late 1946, as the rifles were being tested, one of Kalashnikov's assistants, Aleksandr Zaitsev, suggested a major redesign to improve reliability. At first, Kalashnikov was reluctant, given that their rifle had already fared better than its competitors. Eventually, however, Zaitsev managed to persuade Kalashnikov.

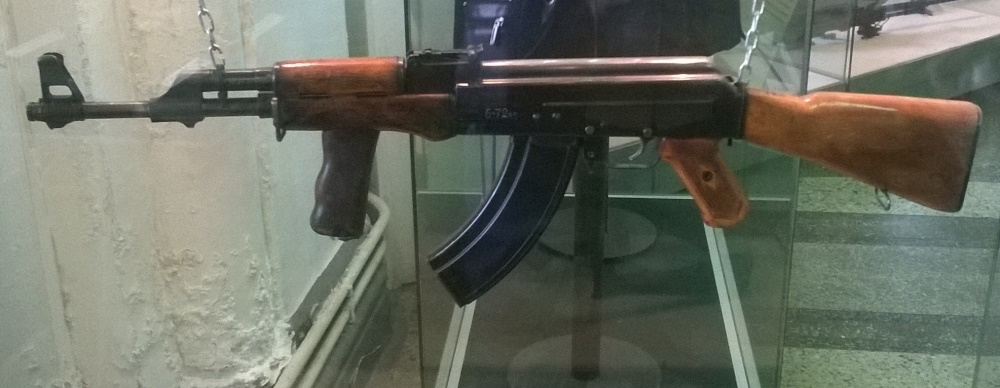
Trial prototype weapon with slab-sided steel magazine

In November 1947, the new prototypes (AK-47s) were completed. The rifle used a long-stroke gas piston above the barrel. The upper and lower receivers were combined into a single receiver. The selector and safety were combined into a single control lever/dust cover on the right side of the rifle and the bolt handle was attached to the bolt carrier. This simplified the design and production of the rifle. The first army trial series began in early 1948. The new rifle proved to be reliable under a wide range of conditions and possessed convenient handling characteristics. In 1949, it was adopted by the Soviet Army as the "7.62 mm Kalashnikov rifle (AK)".

=== Further development ===
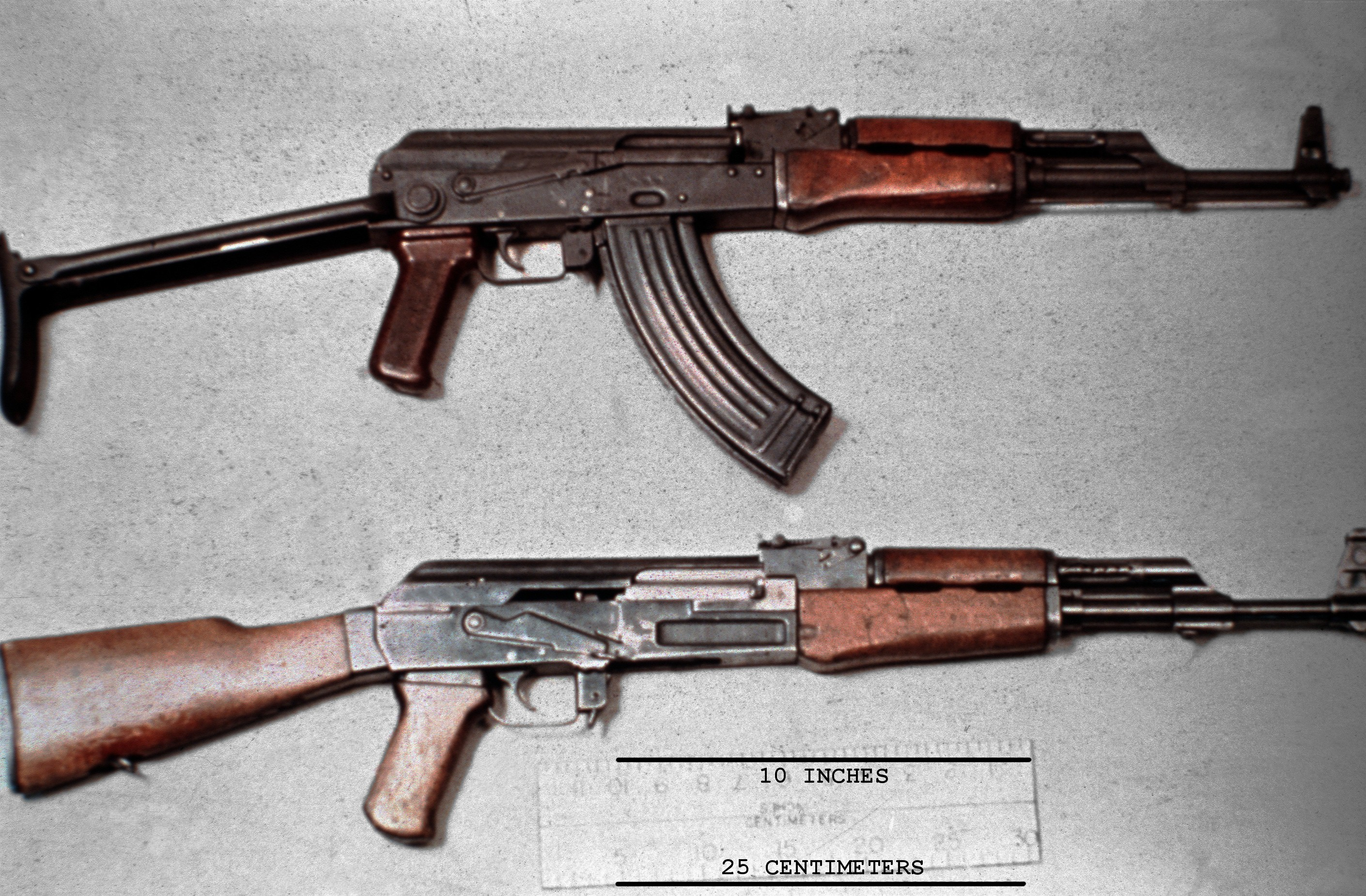
AKMS with a stamped Type 4B receiver (top) and an AK-47 with a milled Type 2A receiver

There were many difficulties during the initial phase of production. The first production models had stamped sheet metal receivers with a milled trunnion and butt stock insert and a stamped body. Difficulties were encountered in welding the guide and ejector rails, causing high rejection rates. Instead of halting production, a heavy (Note: 2.6 lb milled from 6 lb stock. This was about 2.2 lb heavier than the stamped receiver.) machined receiver was substituted for the sheet metal receiver. Even though production of these milled rifles started in 1951, they were officially referred to as AK-49, based on the date their development started, but they are widely known in the collectors' and current commercial market as "Type 2 AK-47". This was a more costly process, but the use of machined receivers accelerated production as tooling and labor for the earlier Mosin–Nagant rifle's machined receiver were easily adapted. Partly because of these problems, the Soviets were not able to distribute large numbers of the new rifles to soldiers until 1956. During this time, production of the interim SKS rifle continued.

Once the manufacturing difficulties of non-milled receivers had been overcome, a redesigned version designated the AKM (M for "modernized" or "upgraded"; in Russian: Автомат Калашникова Модернизированный [Avtomat Kalashnikova Modernizirovanniy]) was introduced in 1959. This new model used a stamped sheet metal receiver and featured a slanted muzzle brake on the end of the barrel to compensate for muzzle rise under recoil. In addition, a hammer retarder was added to prevent the weapon from firing out of battery (without the bolt being fully closed), during rapid or fully automatic fire. This is also sometimes referred to as a "cyclic rate reducer", or simply "rate reducer", as it also has the effect of reducing the number of rounds fired per minute during fully automatic fire. The rifle was also roughly one-third lighter than the previous model.

Receiver type	Description
Type 1A/B	The original stamped receiver for the AK-47 was first produced in 1948 and adopted in 1949. The 1B was modified for an underfolding stock with a large hole present on each side to accommodate the hardware for the under folding stock.
Type 2A/B	The first milled receiver was made from steel forging. It went into production in 1951 and production ended in 1957. The Type 2A has a distinctive socketed metal "boot" connecting the butt stock to the receiver and the milled lightning cut on the sides runs parallel to the barrel.
Type 3A/B	"Final" version of the AK milled receiver made from steel bar stock. It went into production from about 1953–1954 until the AKM was introduced. The most ubiquitous example of the AK milled receiver. The milled lightning cut on the sides is slanted to the barrel axis.
Type 4A/B	AKM receiver stamped from a smooth 1.0 mm (0.04 in) sheet of steel supported extensively by pins and rivets. It went into production in 1959. Overall, the most-used design in the construction of AK-series rifles.

Most licensed and unlicensed productions of the Kalashnikov assault rifle abroad were of the AKM variant, partially due to the much easier production of the stamped receiver. This model is the most commonly encountered, having been produced in much greater quantities. All rifles based on the Kalashnikov design are often colloquially referred to as "AK-47s" in the West and some parts of Asia, although this is only correct when applied to rifles based on the original three receiver types. In most former Eastern Bloc countries, the weapon is known simply as the "Kalashnikov" or "AK". The differences between the milled and stamped receivers includes the use of rivets rather than welds on the stamped receiver, as well as the placement of a small dimple above the magazine well for stabilization of the magazine.

=== Replacement ===
In 1974, the Soviets began replacing their AK-47 and AKM rifles with a newer design, the AK-74, which uses 5.45×39mm ammunition. This new rifle and cartridge had only started to be manufactured in Eastern European nations when the Soviet Union collapsed, drastically slowing the production of the AK-74 and other weapons of the former Soviet bloc.

== Design ==
The AK-47 was designed to be a simple, reliable fully automatic rifle that could be manufactured quickly and cheaply, using mass production methods that were state of the art in the Soviet Union during the late 1940s. The AK-47 uses a long-stroke gas system generally associated with high reliability in adverse conditions. The large gas piston, generous clearance between moving parts, and tapered cartridge case design allow the gun to endure large amounts of foreign matter and fouling without failing to cycle.

=== Cartridge ===
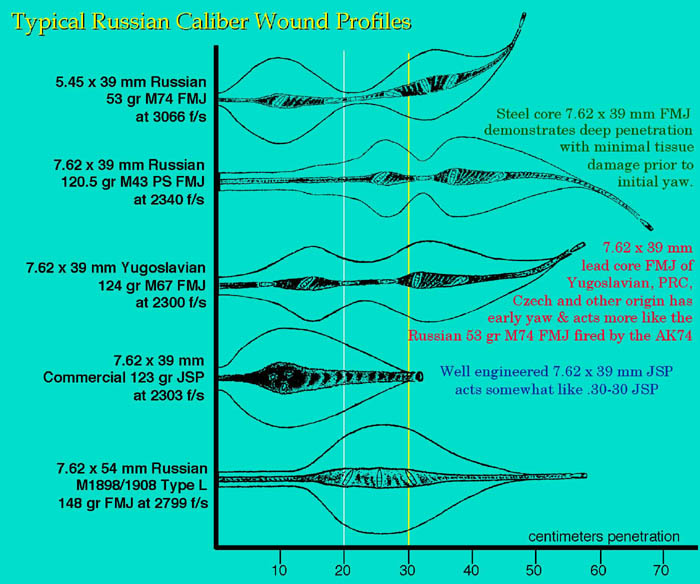
Wound Profiles of Russian small-arms ammunition compiled by Dr. Martin Fackler on behalf of the US military

The AK fires the 7.62×39mm cartridge with a muzzle velocity of 715 m/s (2,350 ft/s).

The cartridge weight is 16.3 g (0.6 oz), and the projectile weight is 7.9 g (122 gr). The original Soviet M43 bullets are 123-grain boat-tail bullets with a copper-plated steel jacket, a large steel core, and some lead between the core and the jacket. The AK has excellent penetration when shooting through heavy foliage, walls, or a common vehicle's metal body and into an opponent attempting to use these things as cover. The 7.62×39mm M43 projectile does not generally fragment when striking an opponent and has an unusual tendency to remain intact even after making contact with bone. The 7.62×39mm round produces significant wounding in cases where the bullet tumbles (yaws) in tissue, but produces relatively minor wounds in cases where the bullet exits before beginning to yaw. In the absence of yaw, the M43 round can pencil through tissue with relatively little injury.

Most, if not all, of the 7.62×39mm ammunition found today is of the upgraded M67 variety. This variety deleted the steel insert, shifting the center of gravity rearward, and allowing the projectile to destabilize (or yaw) at about 3.3 in (8.4 cm), nearly 6.7 in (17 cm) earlier in tissue than the M43 round. This change also reduces penetration in ballistic gelatin to ~25 in (64 cm) for the newer M67 round versus ~29 in (74 cm) for the older M43 round. However, the wounding potential of M67 is mostly limited to the small permanent wound channel the bullet itself makes, especially when the bullet yaws.

=== Operating mechanism ===
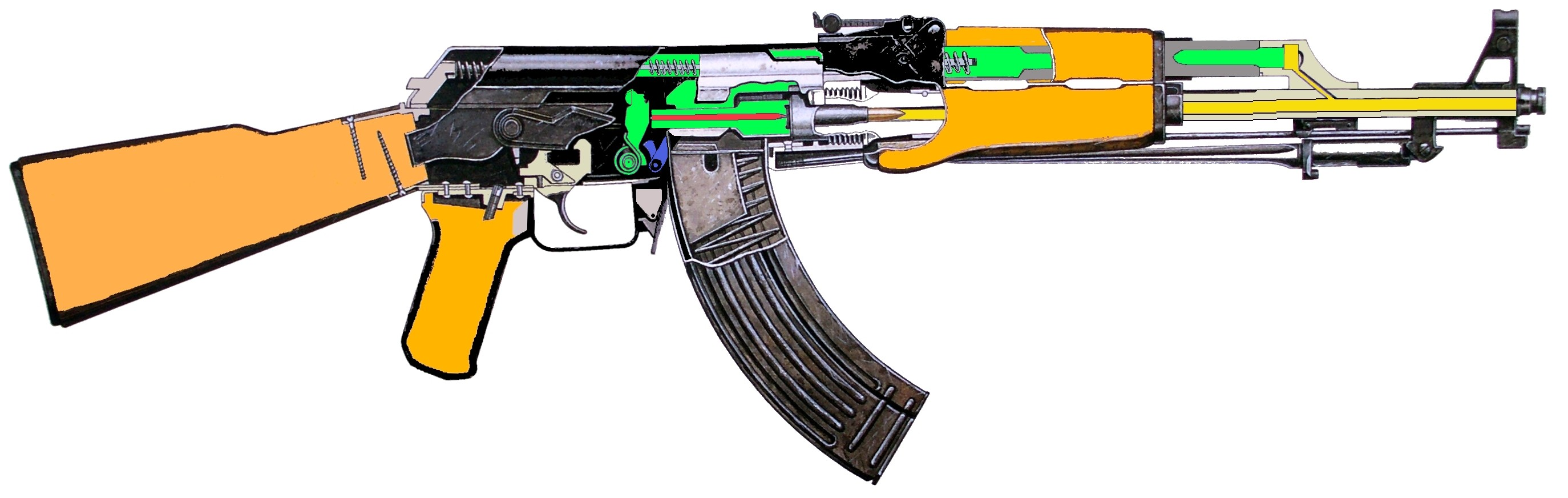
The gas-operated mechanism of a Chinese Norinco Type 56

To fire, the operator inserts a loaded magazine, pulls back and releases the charging handle, and then pulls the trigger. In semi-automatic, the firearm fires only once, requiring the trigger to be released and depressed again for the next shot. In fully automatic, the rifle continues to fire automatically cycling fresh rounds into the chamber until the magazine is exhausted or pressure is released from the trigger.

After ignition of the cartridge primer and propellant, rapidly expanding propellant gases are diverted into the gas cylinder above the barrel through a vent near the muzzle. The build-up of gases inside the gas cylinder drives the long-stroke piston and bolt carrier rearward and a cam guide machined into the underside of the bolt carrier, along with an ejector spur on the bolt carrier rail guide, rotates the bolt approximately 35° and unlocks it from the barrel extension via a camming pin on the bolt. The moving assembly has about 5.5 mm (0.2 in) of free travel, which creates a delay between the initial recoil impulse of the piston and the bolt unlocking sequence, allowing gas pressures to drop to a safe level before the seal between the chamber and the bolt is broken.

The AK-47 does not have a gas valve; excess gases are ventilated through a series of radial ports in the gas cylinder. Unlike many other rifle platforms, such as the AR-15 platform, the Kalashnikov platform bolt locking lugs are chamfered allowing for primary extraction upon bolt rotation which aids reliable feeding and extraction, albeit not with that much force due to the short distance the bolt carrier travels before acting on the locking lug. The Kalashnikov platform then uses an extractor claw along with a fin shaped ejector to eject the spent cartridge case.

=== Barrel ===
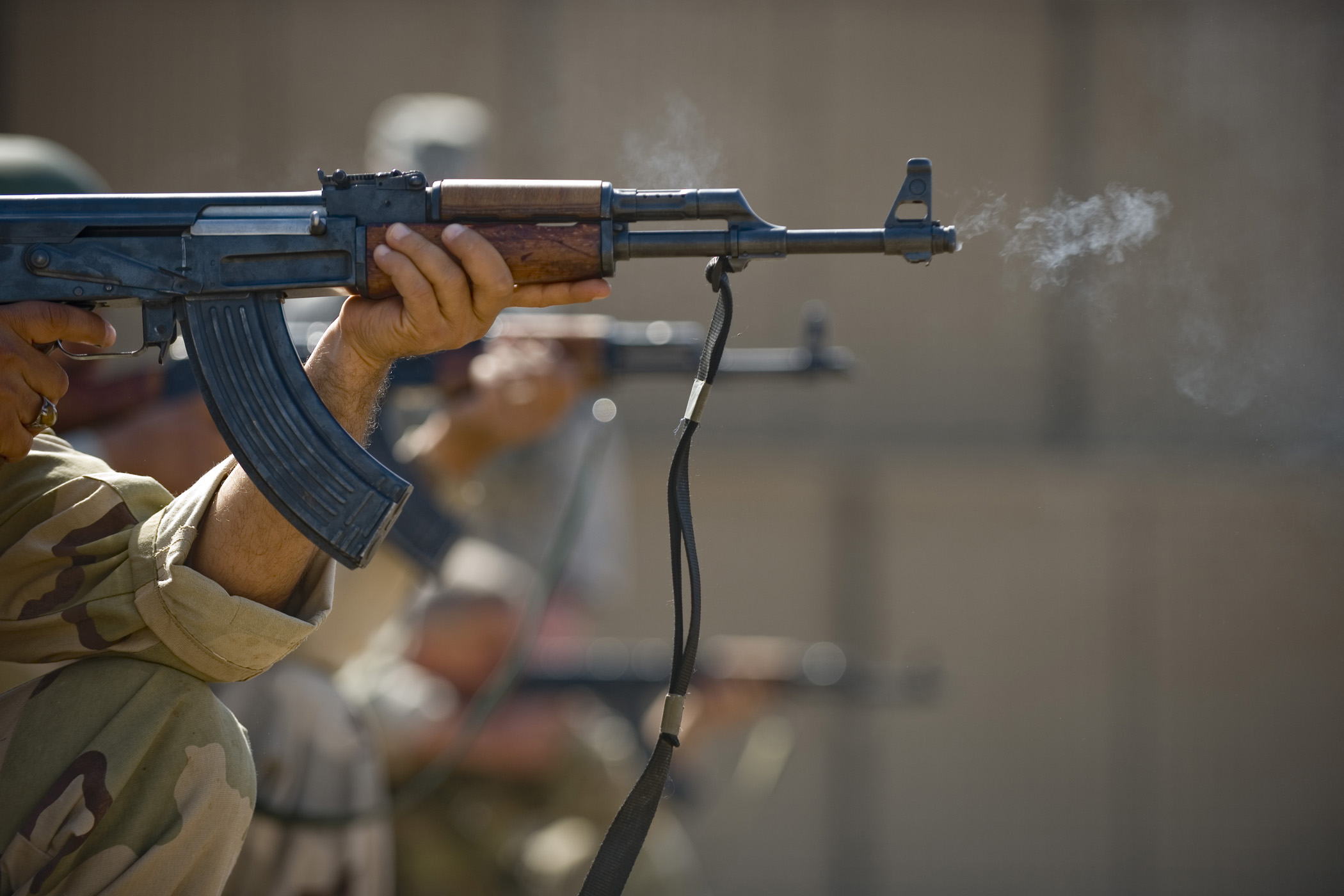
AK-47 barrel and its distinctive gas block with a horizontal row of gas relief ports

The rifle received a barrel with a chrome-lined bore and four right-hand grooves at a 240 mm (1 in 9.45 in) or 31.5 calibers rifling twist rate. The gas block contains a gas channel that is installed at a slanted angle with the bore axis. The muzzle is threaded for the installation of various muzzle devices such as a muzzle brake or a blank-firing adaptor.

=== Gas block ===
The gas block of the AK-47 features a cleaning rod capture or sling loop. Gas relief ports that alleviate gas pressure are placed horizontally in a row on the gas cylinder.

=== Fire selector ===
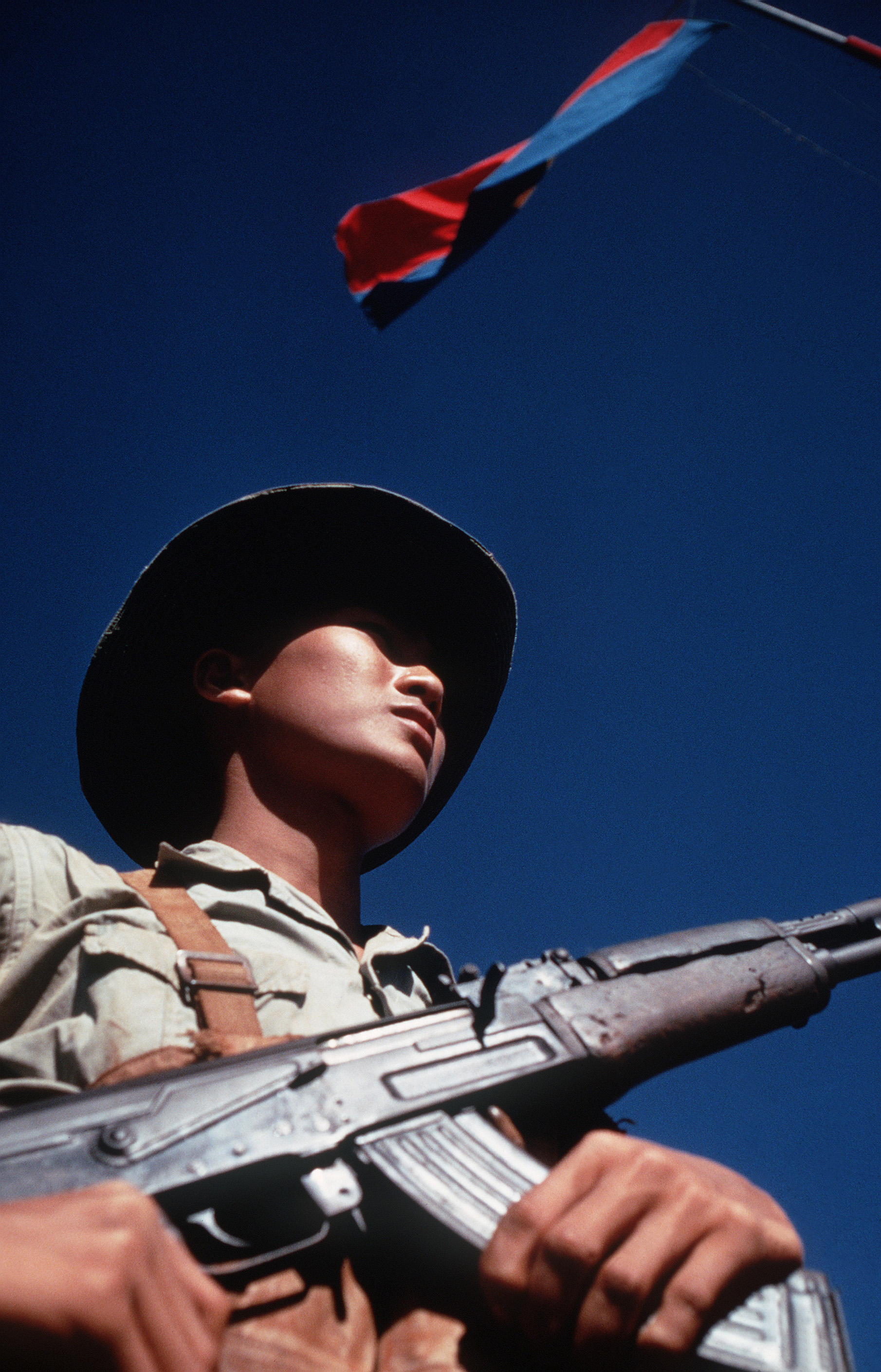
Việt Cộng soldier armed with an AK-47 with the fire selector in the safe setting

The fire selector is a large lever located on the right side of the rifle; it acts as a dust cover and prevents the charging handle from being pulled fully to the rear when it is on safe. It is operated by the shooter's right forefinger and has three settings: safe (up), full-auto (center), and semi-auto (down). The reason for this is that a soldier under stress will push the selector lever down with considerable force, bypassing the full-auto stage and setting the rifle to semi-auto. To set the AK-47 to full-auto requires the deliberate action of centering the selector lever.

To operate the fire selector lever, right-handed shooters have to briefly remove their right hand from the pistol grip, which is ergonomically sub-optimal. Some AK-type rifles also have a more traditional selector lever on the left side of the receiver, just above the pistol grip. This lever is operated by the shooter's right thumb and has three settings: safe (forward), full-auto (center), and semi-auto (backward).

=== Sights ===
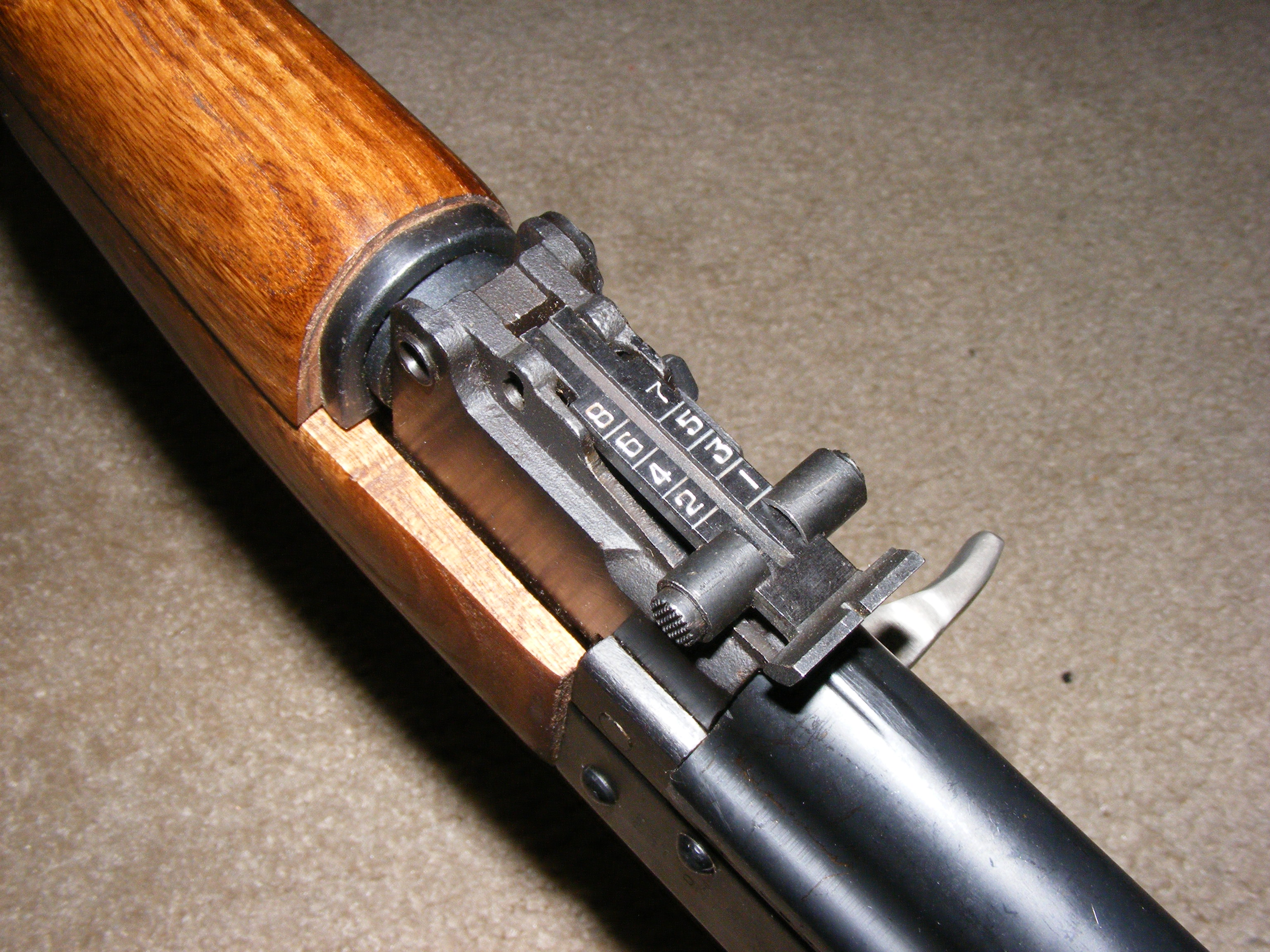
Rear sight of a Chinese Type 56, featuring 100 to 800 m (109 to 875 yd) settings and omission of a battle zero setting

The AK-47 uses a notched rear tangent iron sight calibrated in 100 m (109 yd) increments from 100 to 800 m (109 to 875 yd). The front sight is a post adjustable for elevation in the field. Horizontal adjustment requires a special drift tool and is done by the armory before the issue or if the need arises by an armorer after the issue.

The sight line elements are approximately 48.5 mm (1.9 in) over the bore axis. The "point-blank range" battle zero setting 'П', standing for постоянная (postoyannaya, 'constant') on the 7.62×39mm AK-47 rear tangent sight element corresponds to a 300 m (328 yd) zero. These settings mirror the Mosin–Nagant and SKS rifles, which the AK-47 replaced.

For the AK-47 combined with service cartridges, the 300 m battle zero setting limits the apparent "bullet rise" within approximately −5 to +31 cm (−2.0 to 12.2 in) relative to the line of sight. Soldiers are instructed to fire at any target within this range by simply placing the sights on the center of mass (the belt buckle, according to Russian and former Soviet doctrine) of the enemy target. Any errors in range estimation are tactically irrelevant, as a well-aimed shot will hit the torso of the enemy soldier. Some AK-type rifles have a front sight with a flip-up luminous dot that is calibrated at 50 m (55 yd), for improved night fighting.

=== Furniture ===
The AK-47 was originally equipped with a buttstock, handguard, and an upper heat guard made from solid wood. With the introduction of the Type 3 receiver the buttstock, lower handguard, and upper heat guard were manufactured from birch plywood laminates. Such engineered woods are stronger and resist warping better than the conventional one-piece patterns, do not require lengthy maturing, and are cheaper. The wooden furniture was finished with the Russian amber shellac finishing process. AKS and AKMS models featured a downward-folding metal butt-stock similar to that of the German MP40 submachine-gun, for use in the restricted space in the BMP infantry combat vehicle, as well as by paratroops. All 100 series AKs use plastic furniture with side-folding stocks.

=== Magazines ===
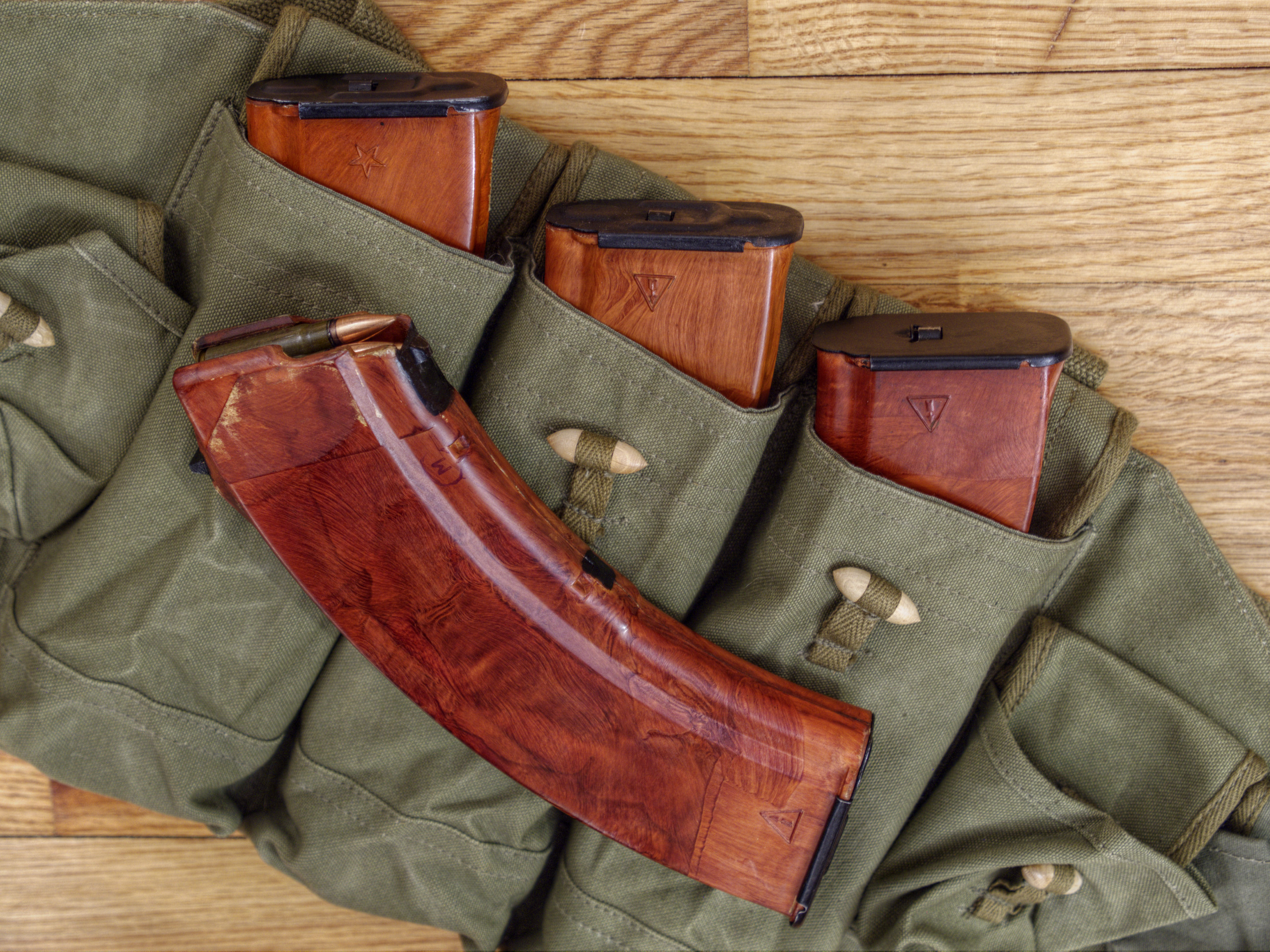
"Bakelite" rust-colored steel-reinforced 30-round plastic box 7.62×39mm AK magazines. Three magazines have an "arrow in triangle" Izhmash arsenal mark on the bottom right. The other magazine has a "star" Tula arsenal mark on the bottom right

The standard magazine capacity is 30 rounds. There are also 10-, 20-, and 40-round box magazines, as well as 75-round drum magazines.

The AK-47's standard 30-round magazines have a pronounced curve that allows them to smoothly feed ammunition into the chamber. Their heavy steel construction combined with "feed-lips" (the surfaces at the top of the magazine that control the angle at which the cartridge enters the chamber) machined from a single steel billet makes them highly resistant to damage. These magazines are so strong that "Soldiers have been known to use their mags as hammers, and even bottle openers". This contributes to the AK-47 magazine being more reliable but makes it heavier than US and NATO magazines.

The early slab-sided steel AK-47 30-round detachable box magazines had 1 mm (0.039 in) sheet-metal bodies and weighed 430 g (0.95 lb) empty. The later steel AKM 30-round magazines had lighter sheet-metal bodies with prominent reinforcing ribs weighing 0.33 kg (0.73 lb) empty. To further reduce weight, a lightweight magazine with an aluminum body with a prominent reinforcing waffle rib pattern weighing 0.19 kg (0.42 lb) empty was developed for the AKM that proved to be too fragile, and the small issued amount of these magazines were quickly withdrawn from service.

As a replacement, steel-reinforced 30-round plastic 7.62×39mm box magazines were introduced. These rust-colored magazines weigh 0.24 kg (0.53 lb) empty and are often mistakenly identified as being made of Bakelite (a phenolic resin), but were fabricated from two parts of AG-S4 molding compound (a glass-reinforced phenol-formaldehyde binder impregnated composite), assembled using an epoxy resin adhesive. Noted for their durability, these magazines did however compromise the rifle's camouflage and lacked the small horizontal reinforcing ribs running down both sides of the magazine body near the front that were added on all later plastic magazine generations.

A second-generation steel-reinforced dark-brown (color shades vary from maroon to plum to near black) 30-round 7.62×39mm magazine was introduced in the early 1980s, fabricated from ABS plastic. The third generation steel-reinforced 30-round 7.62×39mm magazine is similar to the second generation, but is darker colored and has a matte non-reflective surface finish. The current issue is a steel-reinforced matte true black non- reflective surface finished 7.62×39mm 30-round magazine, fabricated from ABS plastic weighing 0.25 kg (0.55 lb) empty.

Early steel AK-47 magazines are 9.75 in (248 mm) long; the later ribbed steel AKM and newer plastic 7.62×39mm magazines are about 1 in (25 mm) shorter.

The transition from steel to mainly plastic magazines yields a significant weight reduction and allows a soldier to carry more ammunition for the same weight.

Rifle	Cartridge	Weight of empty magazine	Weight of loaded magazine	Max. 10.12 kg (22.3 lb) ammunition load*
AK-47 (1949)	7.62×39mm	slab-sided steel 430 g (0.95 lb)	30-rounds 916 g (2.019 lb)	11 magazines for 330 rounds 10.08 kg (22.2 lb)
AKM (1959)	7.62×39mm	ribbed stamped-steel 330 g (0.73 lb)	30-rounds 819 g (1.806 lb)	12 magazines for 360 rounds 9.83 kg (21.7 lb)
AK-103 (1994)	7.62×39mm	steel-reinforced plastic 250 g (0.55 lb)	30-rounds 739 g (1.629 lb)	13 magazines for 390 rounds 9.61 kg (21.2 lb)

All 7.62×39mm AK magazines are backward compatible with older AK variants.

10.12 kg (22.3 lb) is the maximum amount of ammo that the average soldier can comfortably carry. It also allows for the best comparison of the three most common 7.62×39mm AK magazines.

Most Yugoslavian magazines were made with cartridge followers that hold the bolt open when empty.

=== Accessories ===
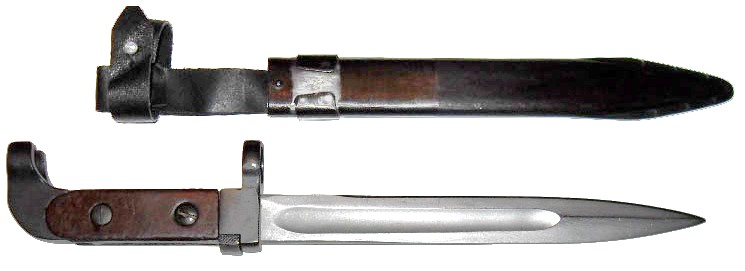
AK-47 6H2 bayonet and scabbard

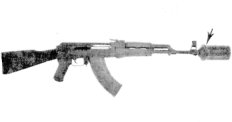
AK-47 with Kalashnikov grenade launcher mounted on the muzzle

Accessories supplied with the rifle include a 387 mm (15.2 in) long 6H3 bayonet featuring a 200 mm (7.9 in) long spear point blade. The AK-47 bayonet is installed by slipping the 17.7 mm (0.70 in) diameter muzzle ring around the muzzle and latching the handle down on the bayonet lug under the front sight base.

All current model AKM rifles can mount under-barrel 40 mm grenade launchers such as the GP-25 and its variants, which can fire up to 20 rounds per minute and have an effective range of up to 400 meters. The main grenade is the VOG-25 (VOG-25M) fragmentation grenade which has a 6 m (9 m) (20 ft (30 ft)) lethality radius. The VOG-25P/VOG-25PM ("jumping") variant explodes 0.5–1 metre (1.6–3.3 ft) above the ground.

The AK-47 can also mount a (rarely used) cup-type grenade launcher, the Kalashnikov grenade launcher that fires standard RGD-5 Soviet hand grenades. The maximum effective range is approximately 150 meters. This launcher can also be used to launch tear gas and riot control grenades.

All current AKs (100 series) and some older models have side rails for mounting a variety of scopes and sighting devices, such as the PSO-1 Optical Sniper Sight. The side rails allow for the removal and remounting of optical accessories without interfering with the zeroing of the optic. However, the 100 series side folding stocks cannot be folded with the optics mounted.

== Characteristics ==
=== Service life ===
The AK-47 and its variants have been and are made in dozens of countries, with "quality ranging from finely engineered weapons to pieces of questionable workmanship." As a result, the AK-47 has a service/system life of approximately 6,000 to 15,000 rounds. The AK-47 was designed to be a cheap, simple, easy-to-manufacture rifle, perfectly matching Soviet military doctrine that treats equipment and weapons as disposable items. As units are often deployed without adequate logistical support and dependent on "battlefield cannibalization" for resupply, it is more cost-effective to replace rather than repair weapons.

The AK-47 has small parts and springs that need to be replaced every few thousand rounds. However, "Every time it is disassembled beyond the field stripping stage, it will take some time for some parts to regain their fit, and some parts may tend to shake loose and fall out when firing the weapon. Some parts of the AK-47 line are riveted together. Repairing these can be quite a hassle since the end of the rivet has to be ground off and a new one set after the part is replaced."

== Variants ==
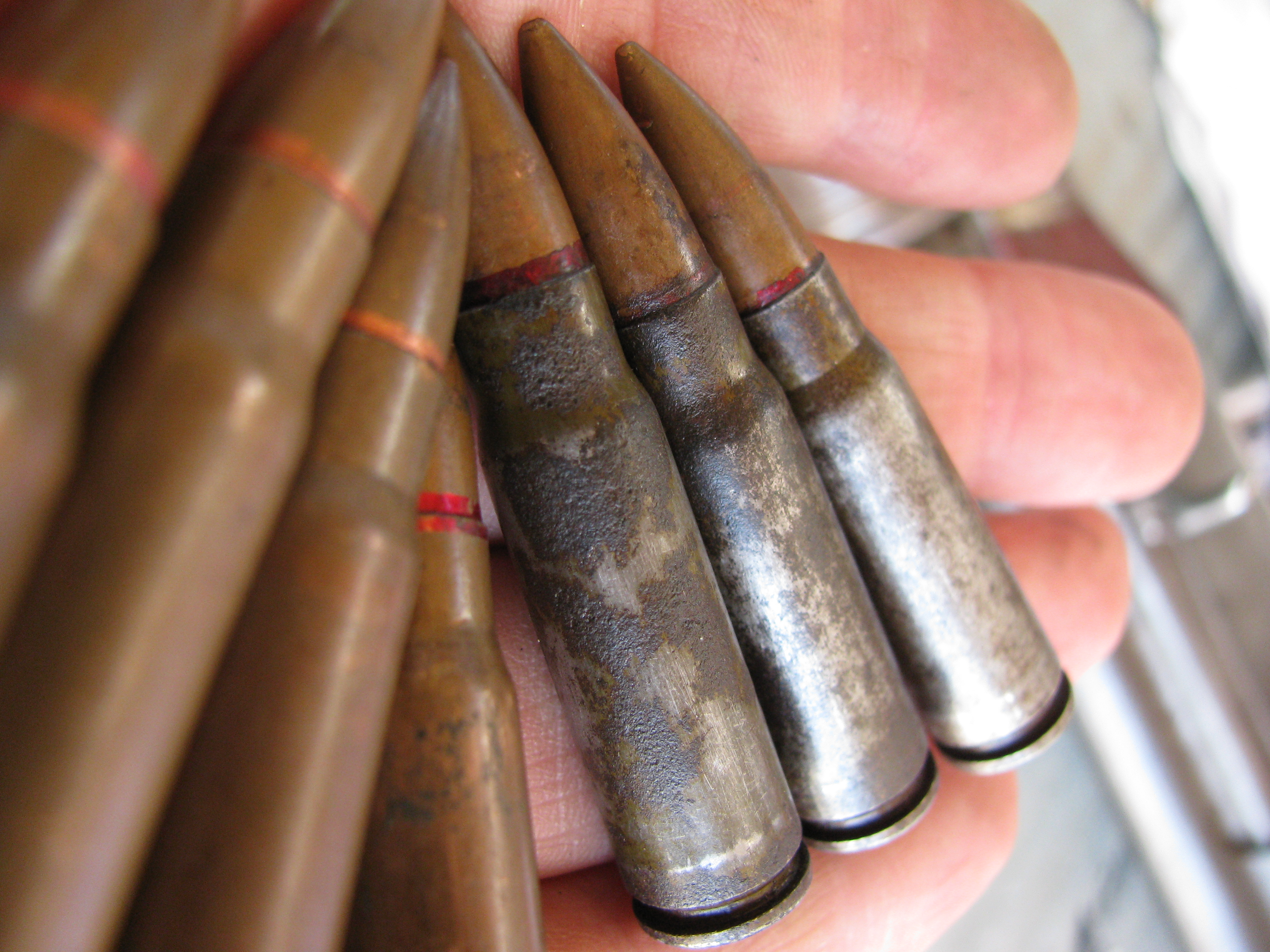
7.62×39mm cartridges from Russia, China and Pakistan

=== Early (7.62×39mm) ===
- Issue of 1948/49: Type 1: The very earliest models, stamped sheet metal receivers, are now very rare.
- Issue of 1951: Type 2: Has a milled receiver. The barrel and chamber are chrome-plated to resist corrosion.
- Issue of 1954/55: Type 3: Lightened, milled receiver variant. Rifle weight is 3.47 kg (7.7 lb).
- AKS (AKS-47): Type 1, 2, or 3 receivers: Featured a downward under folding metal stock similar to that of the MP 40, for use in the restricted space of the BMP infantry combat vehicle, as well as for airborne troops.
- AKN (AKSN): Night sight rail.

=== Modernised (7.62×39mm) ===
- AKM: A simplified, lighter version of the AK-47; the Type 4 receiver is made from stamped and riveted sheet metal. A slanted muzzle device was added to reduce muzzle rise in automatic fire. The rifle weight is 3.1 kg (6.8 lb) due to the lighter receiver. This is the most ubiquitous variant of the AK-47.
  - AKMS: Under-folding stock version of the AKM intended for airborne troops.
  - AKMN (AKMSN): Night scope rail.
  - AKML (AKMSL): Slotted flash suppressor and night scope rail.
- RPK: Hand-held machine gun version with longer barrel and bipod. The variants—RPKS, RPKN (RPKSN), RPKL (RPKSL)—mirror AKM variants. The "S" variants have a side-folding wooden stock.

=== Foreign (7.62×39mm) ===
Country	Military variant(s)
Albania	Automatiku Shqiptar 1978 model 56 (ASH-78 Tip-1) made at Poliçan Arsenal (copy of Type 56 based on AKM rifle); model 56 Tip-2, copy of RPK; model 56 Tip-3 hybrid for multi-purpose roles with secondary rifle and grenade launcher capability; 1982 model (ASH-82) copy of AKMS. Several other versions of the AKMS have been produced mainly with short barrels similar to Soviet AKS-74U for special forces, tank & armoured crew and for helicopter pilots and police. There have also been modified ASh-82 (AKMS) with SOPMOD accessories, mainly for Albania's special forces RENEA & exports.
Algeria	PM-89 and PM-89-1.
Armenia	K-3 (bullpup, 5.45×39mm)
Azerbaijan	Khazri (AK-74M)
Bangladesh	Chinese Type 56
Bulgaria	AKK/AKKS (Type 3 AK-47/w. side-folding buttstock); AKKMS (AKMS), AKKN-47 (fittings for NPSU night sights); AK-47M1 (Type 3 with black polymer furniture); AK-47MA1/AR-M1 (same as -M1, but in 5.56mm NATO); AKS-47M1 (AKMS in 5.56×45mm NATO); AKS-47S (AK-47M1, short version, with East German folding stock, laser aiming device); AKS-47UF (short version of -M1, Russian folding stock), AR-SF (same as −47UF, but 5.56mm NATO); AKS-93SM6 (similar to −47M1, cannot use grenade launcher); and RKKS (RPK), AKT-47 (.22 rimfire training rifle)
Cambodia	Chinese Type 56, Soviet AK-47, and AKM
China	Type 56
Colombia	Galil ACE, Galil Córdova
Croatia	APS-95
Cuba	AKM
East Germany	MPi-K/MPi-KS (AK-47/AKS); MPi-KM (AKM; wooden and plastic stock), MPi-KMS-72 (side-folding stock), MPi-KMS-K (carbine); MPi-AK-74N (AK-74), MPi-AKS-74N (side-folding stock), MPi-AKS-74NK (carbine); KK-MPi Mod.69 (.22 LR select-fire trainer)
Egypt	AK-47, Misr assault rifle (AKMS), Maadi ARM (AKM)
Ethiopia	AK-47, AK-103 (manufactured locally at the State-run Gafat Armament Engineering Complex as the Et-97/1)
Finland	Rk 62, Valmet M76 (other names Rk 62 76, M62/76), Valmet M78 (light machine gun), Rk 95 Tp
Hungary	AK-55 (domestic manufacture of the 2nd Model AK-47); AKM-63 (also known as AMD-63 in the US; modernized AK-55), AMD-65M (modernized AKM-63, shorter barrel and side-folding stock), AMP-69 (rifle grenade launcher); AK-63F/D (other name AMM/AMMSz), AK-63MF (modernized); NGM-81 (5.56×45mm NATO; fixed and under-folding stock)
India	INSAS (fixed and side-folding stock), KALANTAK (carbine), INSAS light machine gun (fixed and side-folding stock), a local unlicensed version with carbon fibre furniture designated as AK-7; and Trichy assault rifle
Iran	KLS/KLF (AK-47/AKS), KLT (AKMS)
Iraq	Tabuk Sniper Rifle, Tabuk Rifle (with fixed or underfolding stock, outright clones of Yugoslavian M70 rifles series), Tabuk Short Rifle (carbine)
Israel	IMI Galil: AR (battle rifle), ARM (rifle/light machine gun), SAR (carbine), MAR (compact carbine), Sniper (sniper rifle), SR-99 (sniper rifle); and Galil ACE
Italy	Bernardelli VB-STD/VB-SR (Galil AR/SAR)
Nigeria	Produced by DICON as OBJ-006
North Korea	Type 58A/B (Type 3 AK-47/w. stamped steel folding stock), Type 68 assault rifle (AKM/AKMS), Type 88 assault rifle (AK-74/AKS-74/w. top folding stock)
Pakistan	Reverse engineered by hand and machine in Pakistan's highland areas (see Khyber Pass Copy) near the border of Afghanistan; more recently the Pakistan Ordnance Factories started the manufacture of an AK-47/AKM clone called PK-10
Poland	PmK (kbk AK) / PmKS (kbk AKS), Kalashnikov SMG name change to Kbk AK, Kalashnikov Carbine in 1960s, (AK-47/AKS); kbkg wz. 1960 (rifle grenade launcher), kbkg wz. 1960/72 (modernized); kbk AKM / kbk AKMS (AKM/AKMS); kbk wz. 1988 Tantal (5.45×39mm), skbk wz. 1989 Onyks (compact carbine); kbs wz. 1996 Beryl (5.56×45mm), kbk wz. 1996 Mini-Beryl (compact carbine)
Romania	PM md. 63/65 (AKM/AKMS), PM md. 80, PM md. 90, collectively exported under the umbrella name AIM or AIMS; PA md. 86 (AK-74) exported as the AIMS-74; PM md. 90 short barrel, PA md. 86 short barrel exported as the AIMR; PSL (designated marksman rifle; other names PSL-54C, Romak III, FPK and SSG-97)
South Africa	R4 rifle, Truvelo Raptor, Vektor CR-21 (bullpup)
Sudan	MAZ (based on the Type 56)
Syria	Type 68 rifles produced under license by the Établissement Industriel de la Défense (EID)/Defense Laboratories Corporation (DLC).
Turkey	SAR 15T, SAR 308 Dağlıoğlu AK-47
Ukraine	Vepr (bullpup, 5.45×39mm), Malyuk (bullpup)
United States	Century Arms: C39 (AK-47 var.), RAS47 (AKM var.), and C39v2 (AK-47 var.), InterOrdnance: AKM247 (AKM var.) M214 (pistol), Palmetto State Armory: PSAK-47 (AKM var.), Arsenal Inc: SA M-7 (AK-47 var.), Destructive Devices Industries: DDI 47S (AKM var.) DDI 47M (AK-47 var), Rifle Dynamics: RD700 and other custom build AK / AKM guns
Vietnam	AKM-1 (AKM), TUL-1 (RPK), Galil Ace 31/32, STV rifle
Venezuela	License granted, factory under construction
Yugoslavia/Serbia	M64, M70, M72, M76, M77, M80, M82, M85, M90, M91, M92, M99, M21

According to the Kalashnikov Concern company (formerly Izhmash), most foreign-made AK-type rifles are unlicensed.

== Accuracy potential ==
=== US military method ===
The AK-47's accuracy is generally sufficient to hit an adult male torso out to about 300 m (328 yd), though even experts firing from prone or bench rest positions at this range were observed to have difficulty placing ten consecutive rounds on target. Later designs did not significantly improve the rifle's accuracy. An AK can fire a 10-shot group of 5.9 in (15 cm) at 100 m (109 yd), and 17.5 in (44 cm) at 300 m (328 yd) The newer stamped-steel receiver AKM models, while more rugged and less prone to metal fatigue, are less accurate than the forged/milled receivers of their predecessors: the milled AK-47s are capable of shooting 3 to 5 in (8 to 13 cm) groups at 100 yd (91 m), whereas the stamped AKMs are capable of shooting 4 to 6 in (10 to 15 cm) groups at 100 yd (91 m).

The best shooters can hit a man-sized target at 800 m (875 yd) within five shots (firing from a prone or bench rest position) or ten shots (standing).

The single-shot hit-probability on the NATO E-type Silhouette Target (a human upper body half and head silhouette) of the AK-47 and the later developed AK-74, M16A1, and M16A2 rifles were measured by the US military under ideal proving ground conditions in the 1980s as follows:

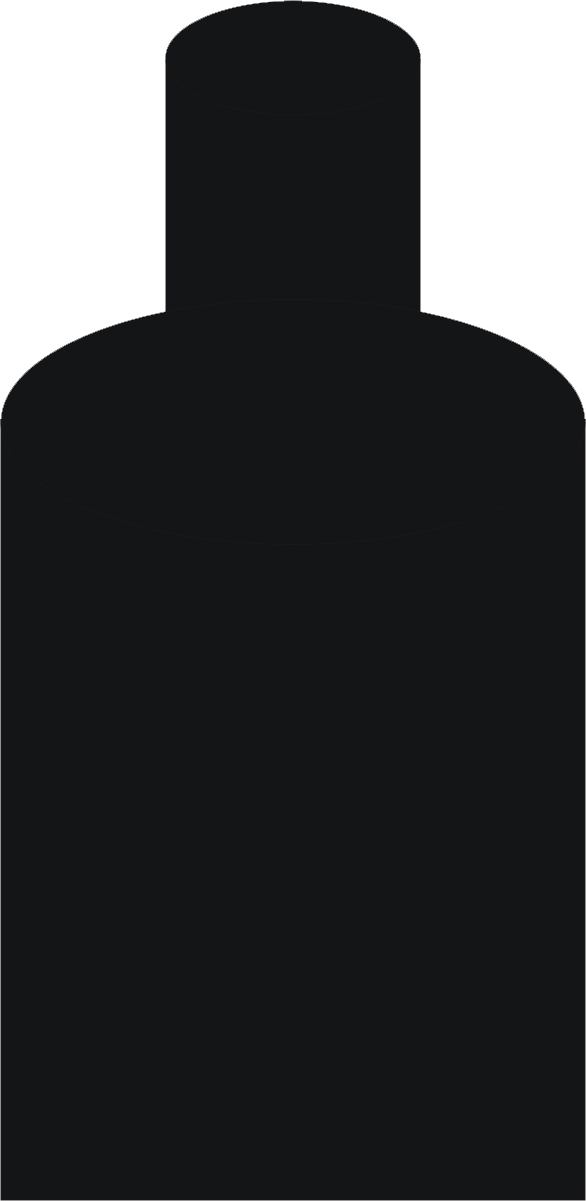
NATO E-type Silhouette Target

Single-shot hit-probability on Crouching Man (NATO E-type Silhouette) Target
Rifle	Chambering	Hit-probability (With no range estimation or aiming errors)								
Rifle	Chambering	50 m	100 m	200 m	300 m	400 m	500 m	600 m	700 m	800 m
AK-47 (1949)	7.62×39mm	100%	100%	99%	94%	82%	67%	54%	42%	31%
AK-74 (1974)	5.45×39mm	100%	100%	100%	99%	93%	81%	66%	51%	34%
M16A1 (1967)	5.56×45mm NATO M193	100%	100%	100%	100%	96%	87%	73%	56%	39%
M16A2 (1982)	5.56×45mm NATO SS109/M855	100%	100%	100%	100%	98%	90%	79%	63%	43%

Under worst field exercise circumstances, the hit probabilities for all the tested rifles were drastically reduced, from 34% at 50m down to 3–4% at 600m with no significant differences between weapons at each range.

=== Russian method ===
The following table represents the Russian circular error probable method for determining accuracy, which involves drawing two circles on the target, one for the maximum vertical dispersion of hits and one for the maximum horizontal dispersion of hits. They then disregard the hits on the outer part of the target and only count half of the hits (50% or R_{50}) on the inner part of the circles. This significantly reduces the overall diameter of the groups. They then use both the vertical and horizontal measurements of the reduced groups to measure accuracy. When the R_{50} results are doubled, the hit probability increases to 93.7%.

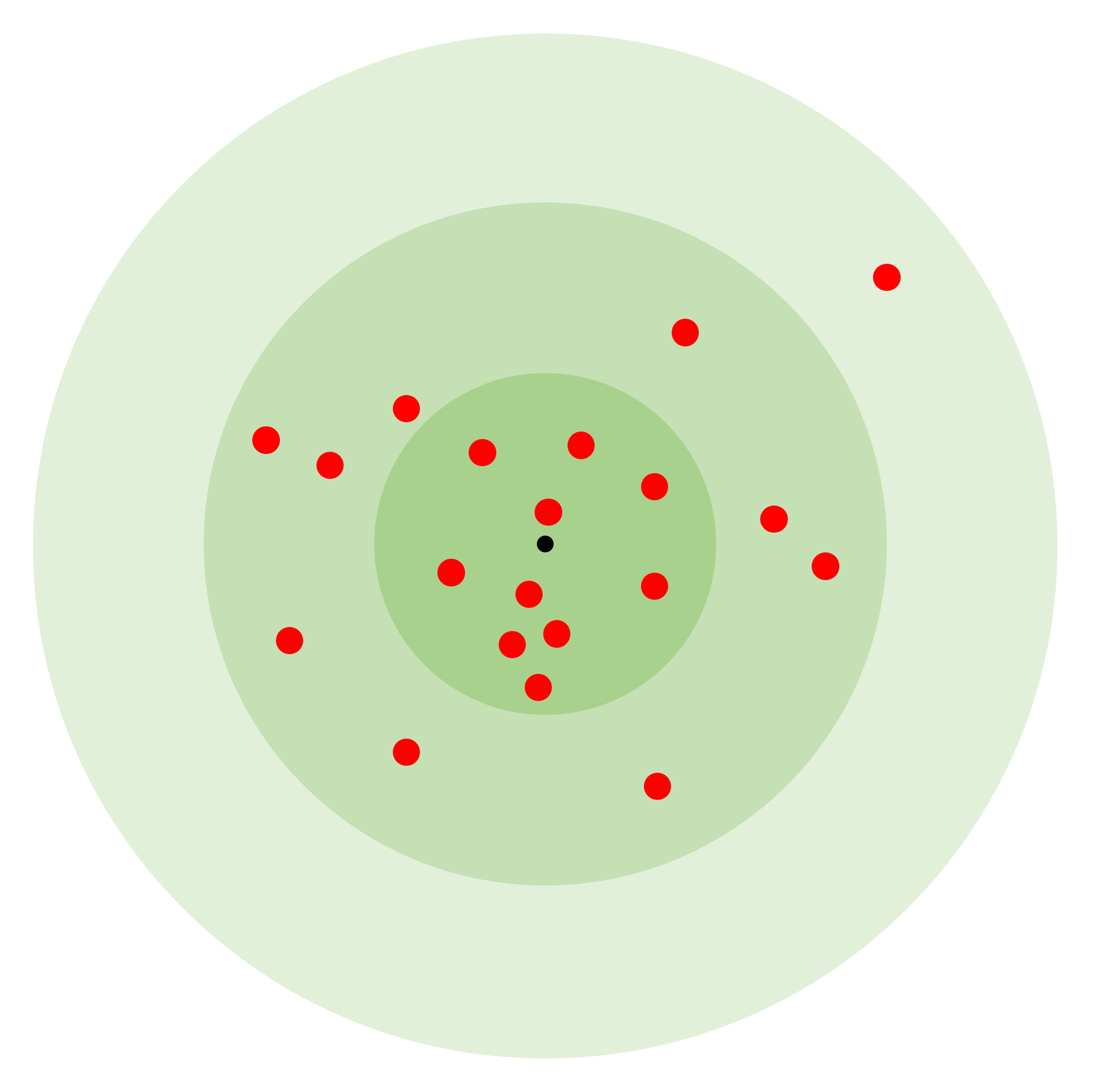
Circular error probable 20 hits distribution example

AK-47 semi-automatic and short burst dispersion with 57-N-231 steel core service ammunition
Range	Vertical accuracy of fire (R_{50}) semi-automatic	Horizontal accuracy of fire (R_{50}) semi-automatic	Vertical accuracy of fire (R_{50}) short burst	Horizontal accuracy of fire (R_{50}) short burst	Remaining bullet energy	Remaining bullet velocity
0 m (0 yd)	0 cm (0.0 in)	0 cm (0.0 in)	0 cm (0.0 in)	0 cm (0.0 in)	2,036 J (1,502 ft⋅lbf)	718 m/s (2,356 ft/s)
100 m (110 yd)	8 cm (3.1 in)	4 cm (1.6 in)	9 cm (3.5 in)	11 cm (4.3 in)	1,540 J (1,140 ft⋅lbf)	624 m/s (2,047 ft/s)
200 m (219 yd)	11 cm (4.3 in)	8 cm (3.1 in)	18 cm (7.1 in)	22 cm (8.7 in)	1,147 J (846 ft⋅lbf)	539 m/s (1,768 ft/s)
300 m (330 yd)	17 cm (6.7 in)	12 cm (4.7 in)	27 cm (10.6 in)	33 cm (13.0 in)	843 J (622 ft⋅lbf)	462 m/s (1,516 ft/s)
400 m (440 yd)	23 cm (9.1 in)	16 cm (6.3 in)	31 cm (12.2 in)	44 cm (17.3 in)	618 J (456 ft⋅lbf)	395 m/s (1,296 ft/s)
500 m (550 yd)	29 cm (11.4 in)	20 cm (7.9 in)	46 cm (18.1 in)	56 cm (22.0 in)	461 J (340 ft⋅lbf)	342 m/s (1,122 ft/s)
600 m (656 yd)	35 cm (13.8 in)	24 cm (9.4 in)	56 cm (22.0 in)	67 cm (26.4 in)	363 J (268 ft⋅lbf)	303 m/s (994 ft/s)
700 m (770 yd)	42 cm (16.5 in)	29 cm (11.4 in)	66 cm (26.0 in)	78 cm (30.7 in)	314 J (232 ft⋅lbf)	282 m/s (925 ft/s)
800 m (870 yd)	49 cm (19.3 in)	34 cm (13.4 in)	76 cm (29.9 in)	89 cm (35.0 in)	284 J (209 ft⋅lbf)	268 m/s (879 ft/s)

- R_{50} means the closest 50 percent of the shot group will all be within a circle of the mentioned diameter.

The vertical and horizontal mean (R_{50}) deviations with service ammunition at 800 m (875 yd) for AK platforms are.

SKS, AK-47, AKM, and AK-74 dispersion at 800 m (875 yd)
Rifle	Firing mode	Vertical accuracy of fire (R_{50})	Horizontal accuracy of fire (R_{50})
SKS (1945)	semi-automatic	38 cm (15.0 in)	29 cm (11.4 in)
AK-47 (1949)	semi-automatic	49 cm (19.3 in)	34 cm (13.4 in)
AK-47 (1949)	short burst	76 cm (29.9 in)	89 cm (35.0 in)
AKM (1959)	short burst	64 cm (25.2 in)	90 cm (35.4 in)
AK-74 (1974)	short burst	48 cm (18.9 in)	64 cm (25.2 in)

== Users ==
=== Current ===
- Afghanistan
- Albania
- Algeria
- Angola
- Armenia
- Azerbaijan
- Bangladesh
- Belarus
- Benin
- Bosnia and Herzegovina
- Botswana
- Bulgaria
- Burkina Faso
- Burundi
- Cambodia
- Cape Verde
- Central African Republic
- Chad
- Chile
- China − Type 56 variant.
- Comoros
- Congo
- Cuba
- DR Congo
- Djibouti
- Egypt
- Equatorial Guinea
- Eritrea
- Ethiopia
- Finland
- Gabon
- Georgia
- Greece − EKAM: The counter-terrorist unit of the Hellenic Police
- Guinea
- Guinea-Bissau
- Guyana
- Hungary
- India
- Indonesia
- Iran
- Iraq
- Israel
- Kazakhstan
- Kyrgyzstan
- Laos
- Lesotho
- Liberia
- Libya
- Madagascar
- Mali
- Malta
- Moldova
- Mongolia
- Morocco
- Mozambique
- Namibia
- Nicaragua
- North Korea − Type 58 variant
- North Macedonia
- Pakistan – Locally made as well as being in service with the Army
- Palestine
- Peru
- Qatar
- Romania
- São Tomé and Príncipe
- Serbia
- Seychelles
- Sierra Leone
- Somalia
- Sudan
- Suriname
- Syria
- Tajikistan
- Tanzania
- Thailand − Used by Thahan Phran
- Togo
- Turkey
- Turkmenistan
- Ukraine
- United Arab Emirates
- United States
- Uzbekistan
- Vietnam
- Yemen
- Zambia
- Zimbabwe

=== Non-state current ===
- Al-Shabaab
- Boko Haram
- ELN
- FARC dissidents
- Hamas
- Hezbollah
- Islamic State − Captured from the Syrian Army
- Karen National Defence Organisation
- Karen National Liberation Army
- Kurdistan Workers Party
- National Movement for the Liberation of Azawad
- New People's Army
- People's Defence Force
- Palestine Liberation Organization
- Ta'ang National Liberation Army

=== Former ===
- East Germany − MPi-K (AK-47) and MPi-KM (AKM)
- Grenada
- North Vietnam − Passed on to the unified Vietnamese state
- Panama − Used by the Panama Defense Forces
- Portugal − Limited use of captured rifles (Note: "A fairly common misconception is that many Portuguese soldiers used captured AK-47 type weapons, but this only held for a few elite units for special missions".)
- Rhodesia
- Soviet Union − Replaced by the AKM and AK-74
- South Vietnam − Captured rifles were issued to ARVN irregular units

=== Non-state former ===
- Afghan mujahideen − CIA supplied Egyptian and Chinese variants
- Chechen Republic of Ichkeria
- Contras
- Donetsk People's Republic
- Farabundo Martí National Liberation Front
- (Iraq) Iraqi insurgents
- (Democratic Kampuchea) Khmer Rouge
- Liberation Tigers of Tamil Eelam
- Luhansk People's Republic
- Malayan National Liberation Army
- Moro National Liberation Front
- (Afghanistan) Northern Alliance
- Provisional Irish Republican Army − Supplied by Libya
- RENAMO
- Revolutionary Armed Forces of Colombia
- (Khalistan movement) Sikh insurgents
- Syrian opposition
- Viet Cong
- Vigorous Burmese Student Warriors

=== Illicit trade ===
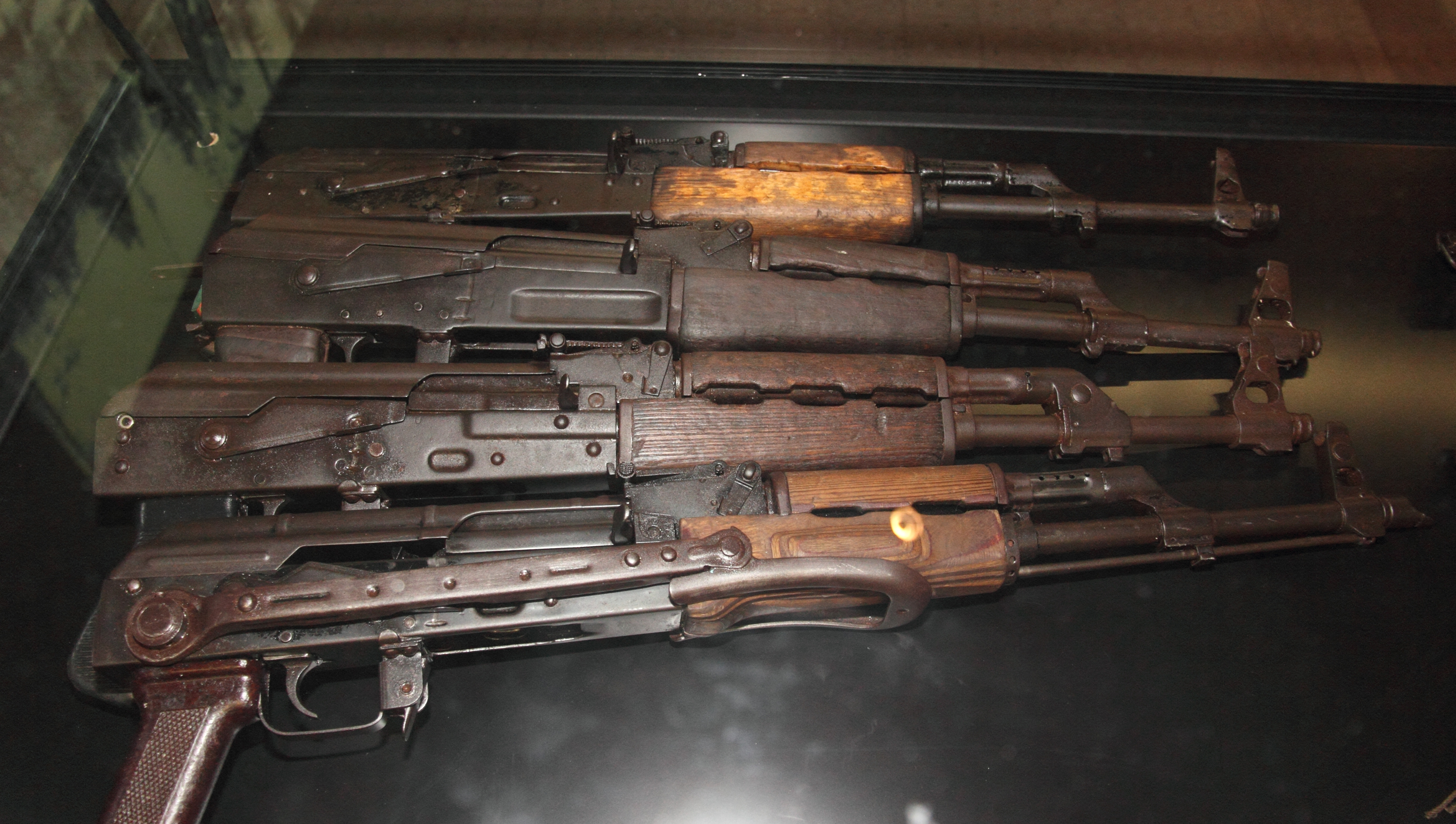
AK-47 copies confiscated from Somali pirates by Finnish mine-layer Pohjanmaa during Operation Atalanta, photographed in Manege Military Museum. The stocks are missing on the top three AKs.

Throughout the world, the AK and its variants are commonly used by governments, revolutionaries, terrorists, criminals, and civilians alike. In some countries, such as Somalia, Rwanda, Mozambique, Congo, and Tanzania, black market prices for AKs are between $30 and $125 per weapon and prices have fallen in the last few decades due to mass counterfeiting. In Kenya, "an AK-47 fetches five head of cattle (about 10,000 Kenya shillings or 100 US dollars) when offered for barter, but costs almost half that price when cash is paid". There are places around the world where AK-type weapons can be purchased on the black market "for as little as $6, or traded for a chicken or a sack of grain".

The AK-47 has also spawned a cottage industry of sorts and has been copied and manufactured (one gun at a time) in small shops around the world (see Khyber Pass Copy). The estimated numbers of AK-type weapons vary greatly. The Small Arms Survey suggests that "between 70 and 100 million of these weapons have been produced since 1947". The World Bank estimates that out of the 500 million total firearms available worldwide, 100 million are of the Kalashnikov family, and 75 million are AK-47s. Because AK-type weapons have been made in many countries, often illicitly, it is impossible to know how many exist.

== Conflicts ==
The AK-47 has been used in the following conflicts:

1940s

- Malayan Emergency (1948−1960)

1950s

- Hungarian Revolution (1956)
- Vietnam War (1955–1975)
- Laotian Civil War (1959–1975)

1960s

- Congo Crisis (1960–1965)
- Portuguese Colonial War (1961–1974)
- Rhodesian Bush War (1964–1979)
- The Troubles (late 1960s–1998)
- Communist insurgency in Thailand (1965–1983)
- South African Border War (1966–1990)
- India-China clashes (1967)
- Cambodian Civil War (1968–1975)
- Communist insurgency in Malaysia (1968–1989)
- Moro conflict (1968−2019)

1970s

- Yom Kippur War (1973)
- Ethiopian Civil War (1974–1991)
- Western Sahara War (1975–1991)
- Cambodian–Vietnamese War (1978–1989)
- Chadian–Libyan War (1978–1987)
- Soviet–Afghan War (1979–1989)

1980s

- 1979 Kurdish rebellion in Iran
- Iran–Iraq War (1980–1988)
- Insurgency in Jammu and Kashmir (1988–present)
- Sri Lankan Civil War (1983–2009)
- United States invasion of Grenada (1983)
- South Lebanon conflict (1985–2000)
- Lord's Resistance Army insurgency (1987–present)
- United States invasion of Panama (1989)
- Insurgency in Punjab (1978-1995)

1990s

- KDPI insurgency (1989–1996)
- Tuareg rebellion (1990–1995)
- Gulf War (1990–1991)
- Somali Civil War (1991–present)
- Yugoslav Wars (1991–2001)
- Burundian Civil War (1993–2005)
- First Chechen War (1994−1996)
- Republic of the Congo Civil War (1997–1999)
- Kargil War (1999)

2000s

- War in Afghanistan (2001–2021)
- Iraq War (2003–2011)
- South Thailand insurgency (2004–present)
- Mexican drug war (2006–present)

2010s

- Libyan Civil War (2011)
- Syrian civil war (2011–2024)
- Iraqi insurgency (2011–2013)
- Central African Republic Civil War (2012–present)
- Mali War (2012–present)
- Russo-Ukrainian War (2014–present)
- Western Iran clashes (2016–2023)

2020s

- Second Nagorno-Karabakh War (2020)
- Tigray War (2020–2022)
- Myanmar civil war (2021–present)
- Russo-Ukrainian war (2022–present)
- September–October 2022 attacks on Iraqi Kurdistan
- Gaza war (2023–present)

== Cultural influence and impact ==
The AK-47 on the flag of Mozambique

The AK-47 on the former coat of arms of Burkina Faso

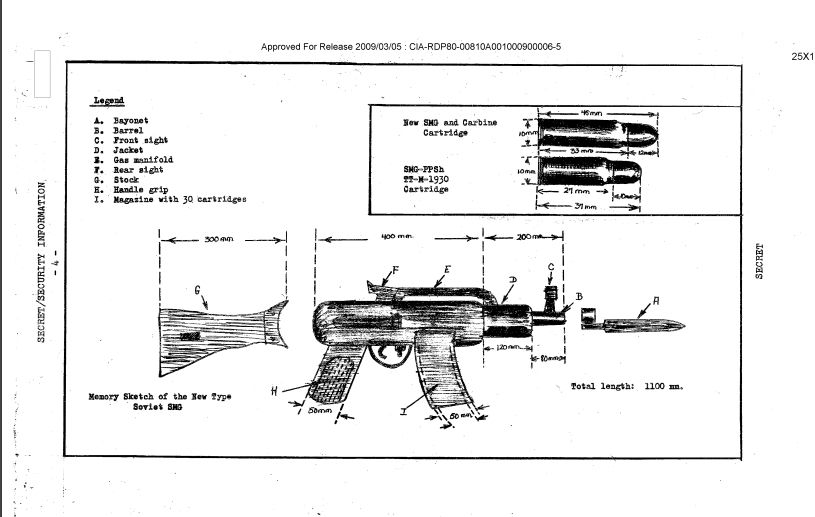
CIA Agent drawing of the alleged first westerner sighting of the AK-47 in 1953

"Basically, it's the anti-Western cachet of it ... And you know, one man's terrorist is another man's freedom fighter, so we all sort of think, oh boy, we've got a little bit of Che Guevara in us. And this accounts for the popularity of the (AK 47) weapon. Plus I think that in the United States it's considered counterculture, which is always something that citizens in this country kind of like ... It's kind of sticking a finger in the eye of the man, if you will."

— Larry Kahaner, author of AK-47: The Weapon That Changed the Face of War

During the Cold War, the Soviet Union and the People's Republic of China, as well as United States and other NATO nations supplied arms and technical knowledge to numerous countries and rebel forces around the world. During this time the Western countries used relatively expensive automatic rifles, such as the FN FAL, the HK G3, the M14, and the M16. In contrast, the Russians and Chinese used the AK-47; its low production cost and ease of manufacture allow them to make AKs in vast numbers.

In the pro-communist states, the AK-47 became a symbol of the Third World revolution. They were utilized in the Cambodian Civil War and the Cambodian–Vietnamese War. During the 1980s, the Soviet Union became the principal arms dealer to countries embargoed by Western nations, including Middle Eastern nations such as Libya and Syria, which welcomed Soviet Union backing against Israel. After the fall of the Soviet Union, AK-47s were sold both openly and on the black market to any group with cash, including drug cartels and dictatorial states, and more recently they have been seen in the hands of Islamist groups such as Al-Qaeda, the Islamic State, and the Taliban in Afghanistan and Iraq, and communist and socialist groups such as the Sandinistas in Nicaragua and FARC and Ejército de Liberación Nacional guerrillas in Colombia.

In Russia, the Kalashnikov is a tremendous source of national pride. "The family of the inventor of the world's most famous rifle, Mikhail Kalashnikov, has authorized German engineering company MMI to use the well-known Kalashnikov name on a variety of not-so-deadly goods." In recent years, Kalashnikov Vodka has been marketed with souvenir bottles in the shape of the AK-47 Kalashnikov. There are also Kalashnikov watches, umbrellas, and knives.

The Kalashnikov Museum (also called the AK-47 museum) opened on 4 November 2004 in Izhevsk, Udmurt Republic. This city is in the Ural Region of Russia. The museum chronicles the biography of General Kalashnikov and documents the invention of the AK-47. The museum complex of Kalashnikov's small arms, a series of halls, and multimedia exhibitions are devoted to the evolution of the AK-47 rifle and attracts 10,000 monthly visitors. Nadezhda Vechtomova, the museum director, stated in an interview that the purpose of the museum is to honor the ingenuity of the inventor and the hard work of the employees and to "separate the weapon as a weapon of murder from the people who are producing it and to tell its history in our country".

On 19 September 2017 a 9 metres (30 ft) monument of Kalashnikov was unveiled in central Moscow. A protester, later detained by police, attempted to unfurl a banner reading "a creator of weapons is a creator of death".

The proliferation of this weapon is reflected by more than just numbers. The AK-47 is included on the flag of Mozambique and its emblem, an acknowledgment that the country gained its independence in large part through the effective use of their AK-47s. It is also found in the coats of arms of East Timor, Zimbabwe and the revolution era Burkina Faso, as well as in the flags of Hezbollah, Syrian Resistance, FARC-EP, the New People's Army, TKP/TIKKO and the International Revolutionary People's Guerrilla Forces.

US and Western Europe countries frequently associate the AK-47 with their enemies, both Cold War era and present-day. For example, Western works of fiction (movies, television, novels, video games) often portray criminals, gang members, insurgents, and terrorists using AK-47s as the weapon of choice. Conversely, throughout the developing world, the AK-47 can be positively attributed with revolutionaries against foreign occupation, imperialism, or colonialism.

In Ireland the AK-47 is associated with The Troubles due to its extensive use by republican paramilitaries during this period. In 2013, a decommissioned AK-47 was included in the A History of Ireland in 100 Objects collection.

The AK-47 made an appearance in US popular culture as a recurring focus in the Nicolas Cage film Lord of War (2005). Numerous monologues in the movie focus on the weapon, and its effects on global conflict and the gun running market.

In Iraq and Afghanistan, private military company contractors from the UK and other countries used the AK-47 and its variants along with Western firearms such as the AR-15.

In 2006, the Colombian musician and peace activist César López devised the escopetarra, an AK converted into a guitar. One sold for US$17,000 in a fundraiser held to benefit the victims of anti-personnel mines, while another was exhibited at the United Nations' Conference on Disarmament.

In Mexico, the AK-47 is known as "Cuerno de Chivo" (literally "Goat's Horn") because of its curved magazine design. It is one of the weapons of choice of Mexican drug cartels. It is sometimes mentioned in Mexican folk music lyrics.

== Gallery ==
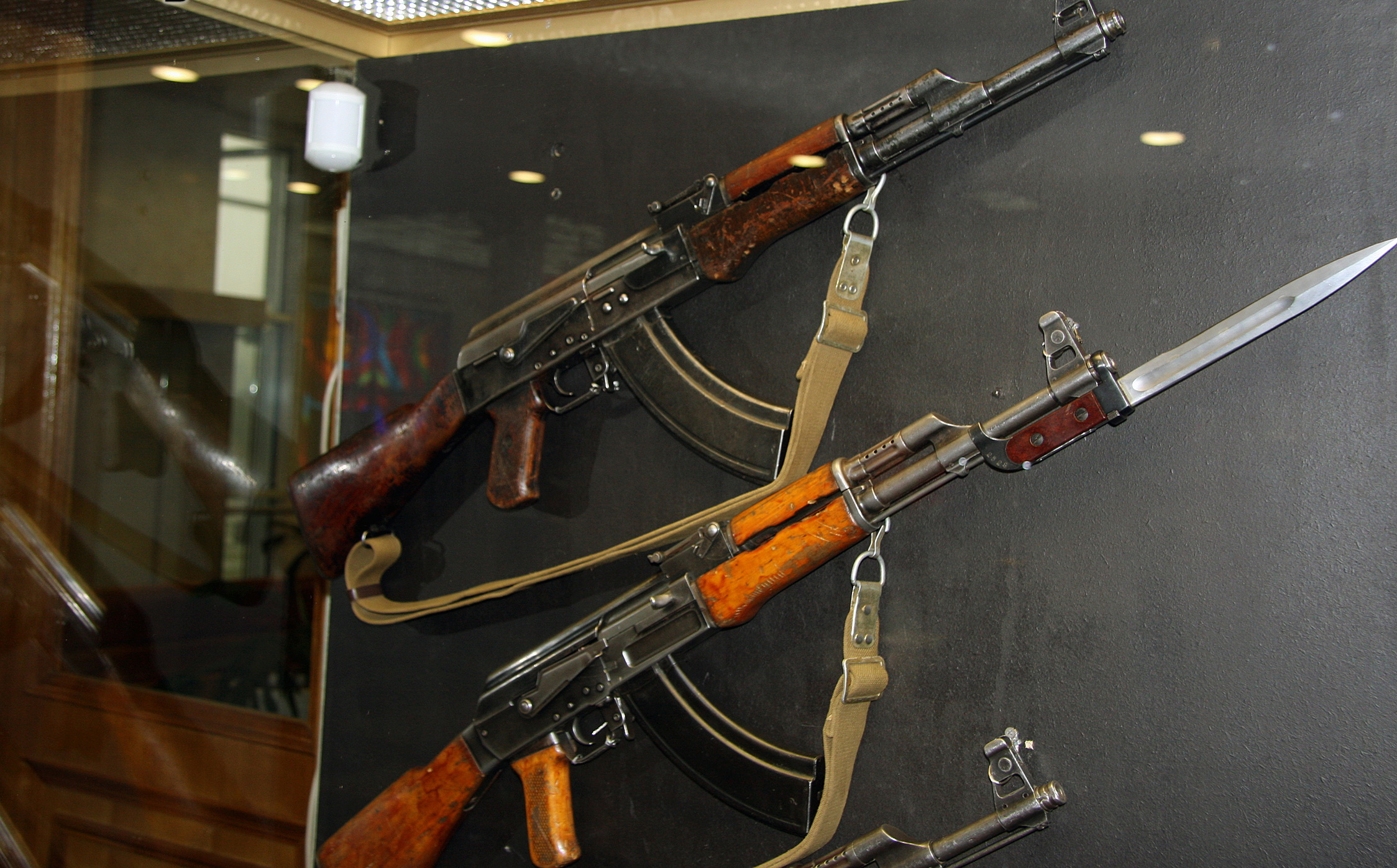
An AK-47 Type 1 (top) and 2 (bottom) on display. The Type 1 features a stamped receiver while the Type 2 receiver is milled.

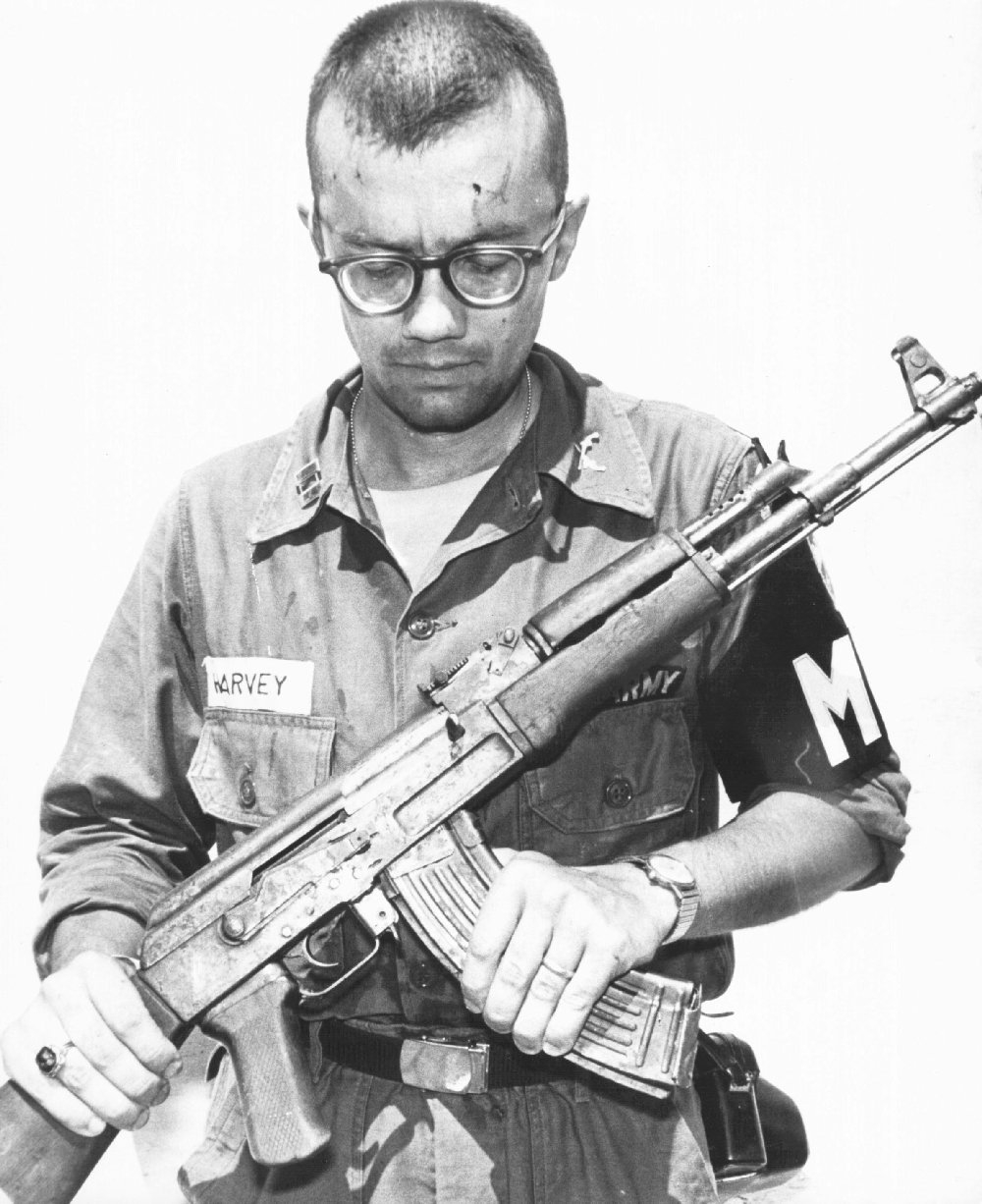
A US Army MP inspects a Chinese Type 56 (an AK-47 derivative) recovered in Vietnam, 1968

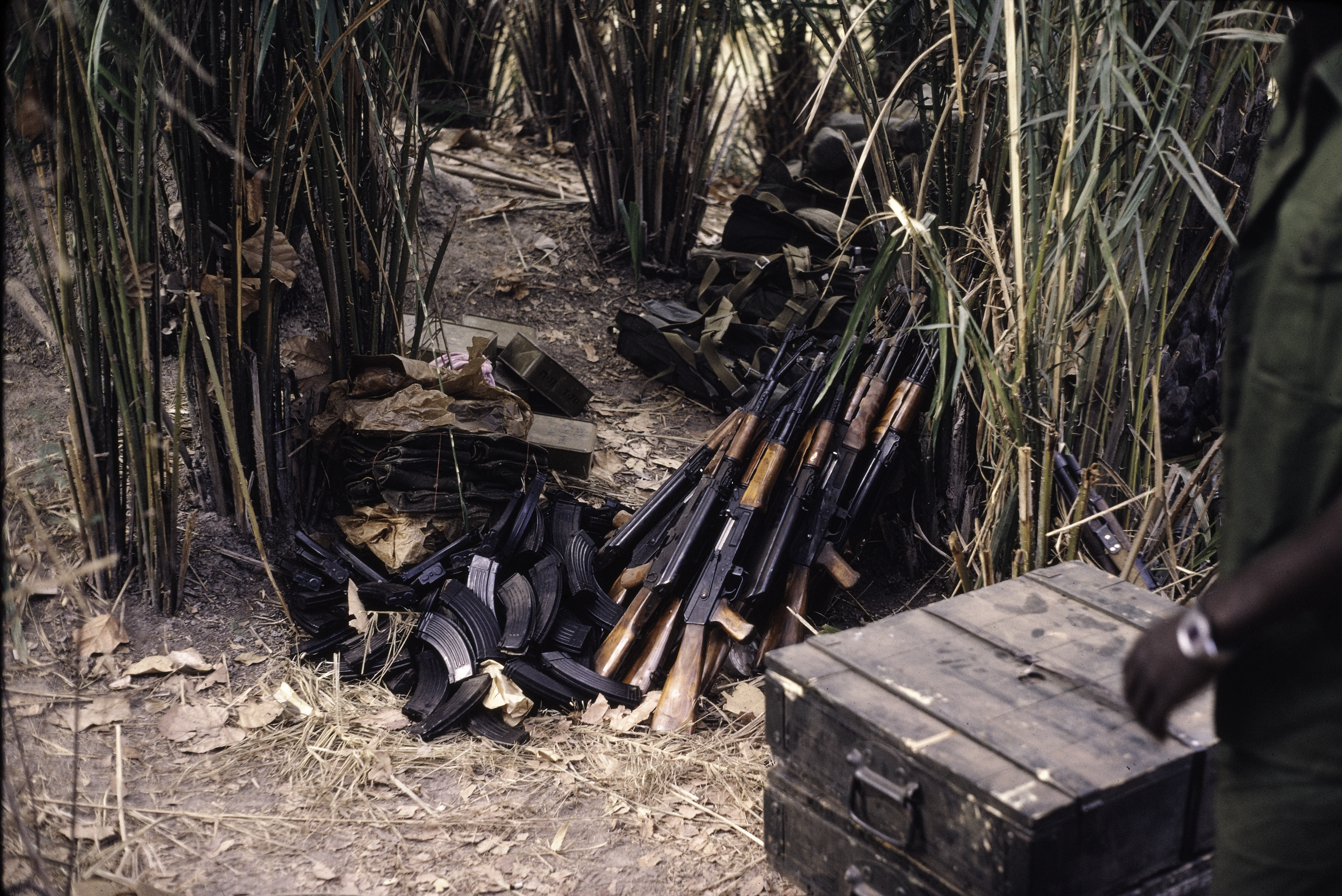
AK-47s of the PAIGC-liberation movement, ready to be transported from Senegal to Guinea-Bissau, 1973

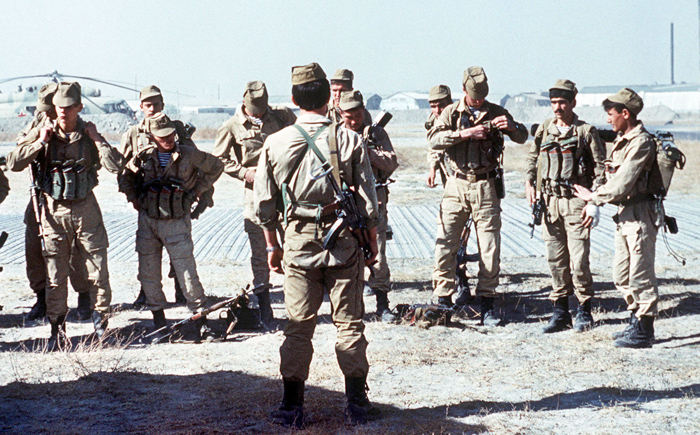
A Soviet Spetsnaz (special operations) group prepares for a mission in Afghanistan, 1988

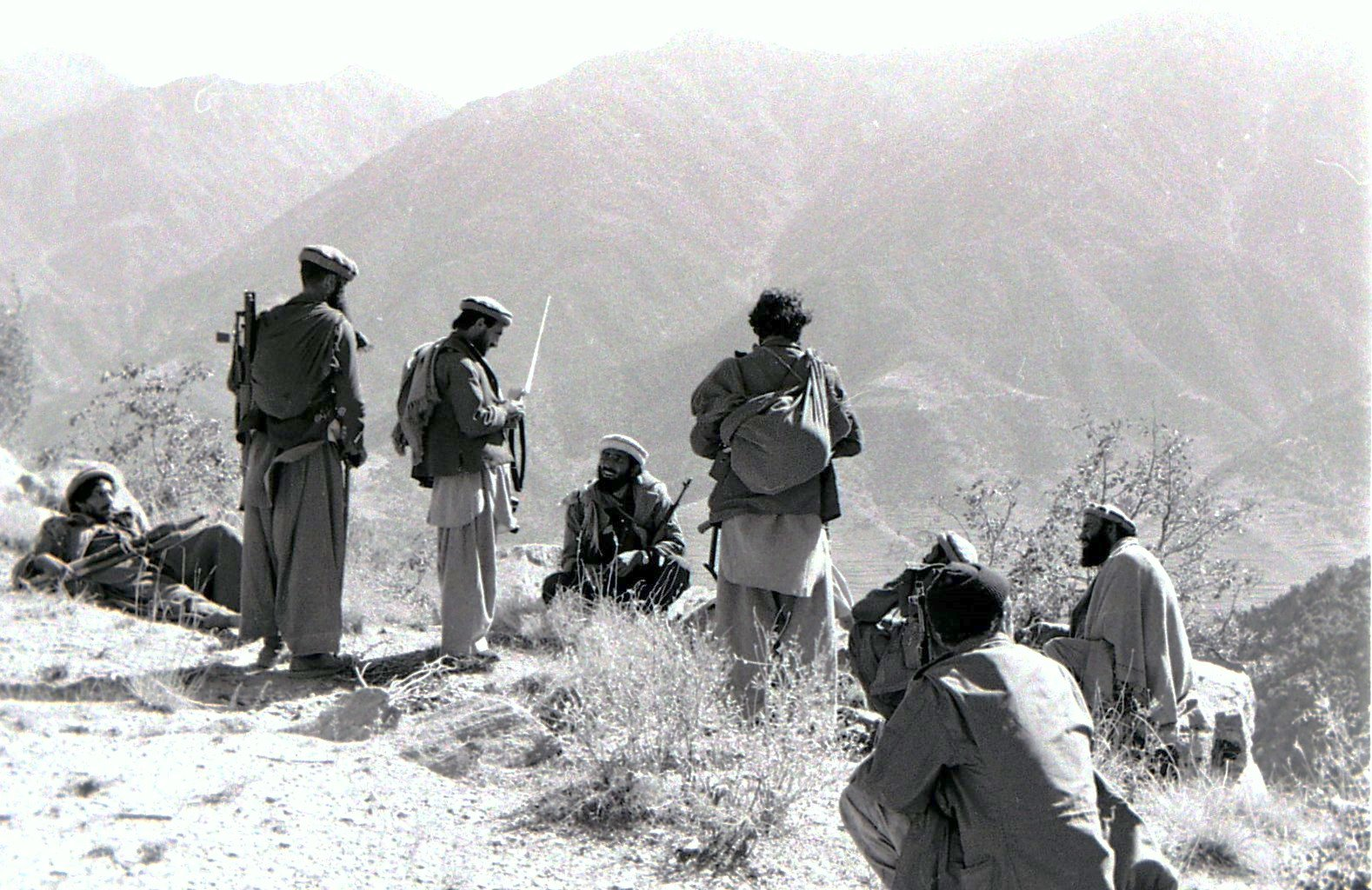
During the Soviet–Afghan War in the 1980s, several sources simultaneously armed both sides of the Afghan conflict, filling the country with AK-47s and their derivatives.

== See also ==
- AK-12
- Comparison of the AK-47 and M16
- Colt CK901
- Draco Pistol
- PK machine gun
- vz. 58
- Zastava M72

== Bibliography ==
- Bracamonte, José Angel Moroni; Spencer, David E. (1995). Strategy and Tactics of the Salvadoran FMLN Guerrillas – Last Battle of the Cold War, Blueprint for Future Conflicts. Bloomsbury Academic. ISBN 9780275950187.
- Binder, L. James, ed. (May 1987). "On the Ramparts in Central America". Army. 37 (5). Arlington, VA: Association of the United States Army: 18−40. ISSN 0004-2455.
- Bolotin, David Naumovich (1995). История советского стрелкового оружия и патронов [The History of Soviet Small Arms and Ammunition] (PDF). Voyenno-Istoricheskaya Biblioteka (in Russian). Saint Petersburg: Poligon. ISBN 5-85503-072-5. Archived (PDF) from the original on 9 October 2022.
- Bolotin, David Naumovich (1995a). Walter, John; Pohjolainen, Heikki (eds.). Soviet Small Arms and Ammunition. Translated by Igor F. Naftul'eff. Hyvinkää: Finnish Arms Museum Foundation (Suomen asemuseosäätiö). ISBN 9519718419.
- Felbab-Brown, Vanda (2009). Shooting Up: Counterinsurgency and the War on Drugs. Rowman & Littlefield. ISBN 978-0-8157-0450-8.
- Florence, John, ed. (1983). "A Caribbean Arms Cache". Engineer. 13 (4). Fort Belvoir, VA: United States Army Engineer Center: 31. ISSN 0046-1989.
- German, Tracey C. (2003). Russia's Chechen War. Routledge. ISBN 978-1-134-43250-9.
- Gulevich, I. D., ed. (1967). НСД. 7,62-мм автомат АК [7.62 mm AK] (in Russian) (3rd ed.). Moscow: Voenizdat.
- Hasenauer, Heike (December 1990). "Panama − One Year Later". Soldiers. 45 (12). Alexandria, VA: Department of the Army: 50−52. ISSN 0093-8440.
- Horgan, John; Braddock, Kurt (2012). Terrorism Studies: A Reader. Routledge. ISBN 978-0-415-45504-6.
- Jones, Richard D; Ness, Leland S, eds. (2010). Jane's Infantry Weapons 2010–2011. Jane's Information Group. ISBN 978-0-7106-2908-1.
- Lanning, Col Michael Lee (2011). Inside the LRRPs: Rangers in Vietnam. Random House Publishing Group. ISBN 978-0-307-80146-3.
- Monetchikov, Sergei Borisovich (2005). История русского автомата [The History of Russian Assault Rifle]. Entsiklopediya Russkoi Armii (in Russian). Izdatel'stvo "Atlant 44". ISBN 5-98655-006-4. Archived from the original on 16 May 2013.
- Moorcraft, Paul L. (April 1987). "The Savage, Silent War". Army. 37 (4). Arlington, VA: Association of the United States Army: 42−52. ISSN 0004-2455.
- Morea, Major Gary J. (May–June 2008). "From Enduring Strife to Enduring Peace in the Philippines" (PDF). Military Review. 88 (3). Fort Leavenworth, KS: US Army Command and General Staff College: 38−48. ISSN 0026-4148.
- Poyer, Joe (2006). The AK-47 and AK-74 Kalashnikov Rifles and Their Variations: A Shooter's and Collector's Guide. North Cape Publications. ISBN 978-1-882391-41-7.
- Rottman, Gordon (2011). The AK-47: Kalashnikov-series assault rifles. Osprey Publishing. ISBN 978-1-84908-835-0. Archived from the original on 26 September 2013.
- Tucker-Jones, Anthony (2012). Kalashnikov in Combat. Casemate Publishers. ISBN 978-1-78303-858-9.
- Venter, Al J. (2023). Portugal's Bush War in Mozambique. Casemate. ISBN 978-1-61200-937-7.
- Vilchinsky, I. K., ed. (1983). НСД. 7,62-мм автомат АКМ (АКМС) [7.62 mm AKM (AKMS)] (PDF) (in Russian) (3rd ed.). Moscow: Voenizdat. Archived from the original (PDF) on 7 May 2023.
- Zagdanski, Captain Jonathan D. (September–October 2007). Eno, Russel A (ed.). "Round 2 in Lebanon: How the IDF Focused on COIN and Lost the Ability to Fight Manuever War". Infantry. 96 (5). Fort Benning, GA: U.S. Army Infantry School: 32−35. ISSN 0019-9532.
