= Type 56 assault rifle =

Chinese AK-47 variant

Type 56
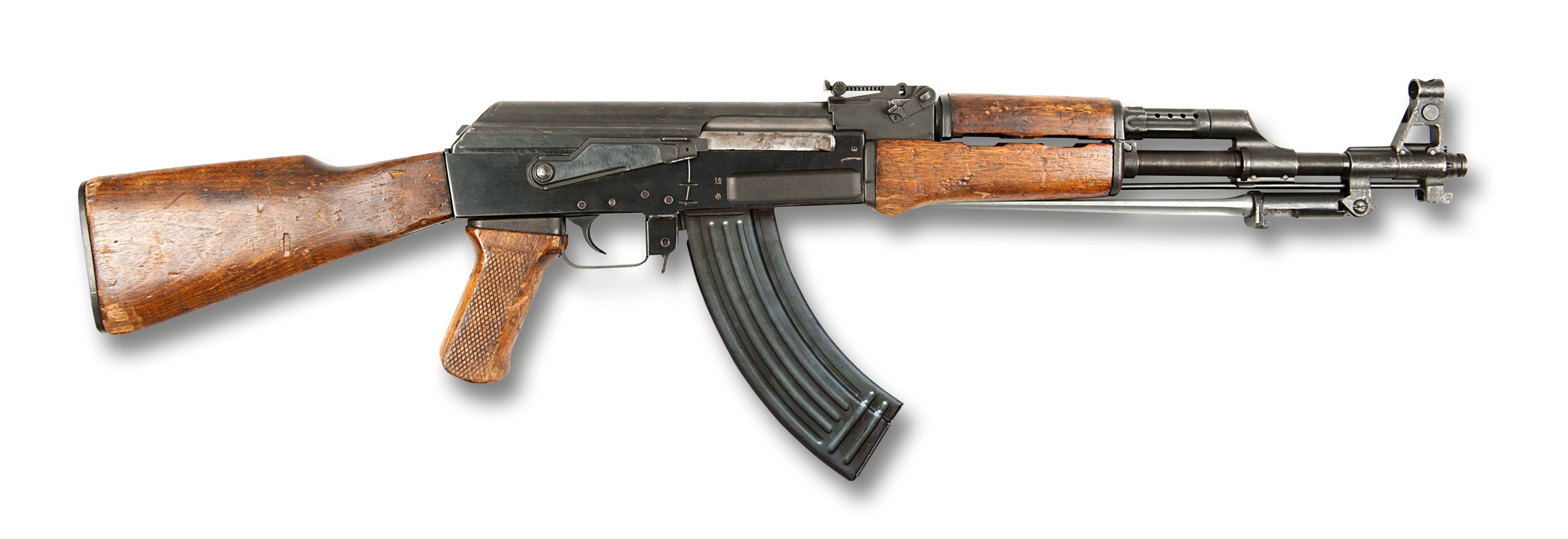
- Type 56 rifle with Bayonet
- Type: Assault rifle
- Place of origin: China

Service history
- In service: 1956–present
- Used by: See Users
- Wars: Vietnam War; Rhodesian Bush War; Cambodian Civil War; Laotian Civil War; Sino-Vietnamese War; Soviet–Afghan War; Iran–Iraq War; Sri Lankan Civil War; Insurgency in Jammu and Kashmir; Somali Civil War; Tuareg rebellion (1990–1995); Persian Gulf War; Kosovo War; War in Afghanistan (2001–2021); Iraq War; Kivu conflict Mexican drug war Iraqi insurgency (2011–2013); War in Iraq (2013–2017); OLA insurgency Russo-Ukrainian war 2025 Cambodia‒Thailand conflict

Production history
- Designed: 1956
- Manufacturer: State Factory 66; Norinco; PolyTech
- Produced: 1956–present
- No. built: 10,000,000+
- Variants: Type 56; Type 56-1; Type 56-2

Specifications
- Mass: Type 56: 3.8 kg (8.38 lb); Type 56-1: 3.7 kg (8.16 lb); Type 56-2/56-4: 3.9 kg (8.60 lb); QBZ-56C: 2.85 kg (6.28 lb)
- Length: Type 56: 882 mm (34.7 in); Type 56-1/56-2: 874 mm (34.4 in) w/ stock extended, 654 mm (25.7 in) w/ stock folded. QBZ-56C: 764 mm (30.1 in) w/ stock extended, 557 mm (21.9 in) w/ stock folded.
- Barrel length: Type 56, Type 56-I, Type 56-II: 414 mm (16.3 in); QBZ-56C: 280 mm (11.0 in)
- Cartridge: Type 56 variants -7.62×39mm Type 84S – 5.56×45mm
- Caliber: 7.62mm
- Action: Gas-operated, rotating bolt
- Rate of fire: 650 rounds/min
- Muzzle velocity: Type 56, Type 56-I, Type 56-II: 735 m/s (2,411 ft/s); QBZ-56C: 665 m/s (2182 ft/s)
- Effective firing range: 100–800 m sight adjustments. Effective range 300–400 meters
- Feed system: 20, 30, or 40-round detachable box magazine
- Sights: Adjustable Iron sights

The Type 56 (Chinese: 56式自動步槍, lit. 'Type 56 automatic rifle') is a Chinese 7.62×39mm assault rifle and Kalashnikov rifle variant.

== History ==
In 1955, the Soviet Union provided China with information and production equipment for the AK and SKS.

Production started in 1956 at State Factory 66 but was eventually handed over to Norinco and PolyTech, who continue to manufacture the rifle primarily for export.

== Design ==
Originally, the Type 56 was a direct, licensed copy of the AK's final iteration, and featured a milled receiver.

The Type 56 features a fixed wooden stock and folding spike bayonet. Starting in the mid-1960s, the guns were manufactured with stamped receivers, much like the then new Soviet AKM.

Visually, most versions of the Type 56 are distinguished from the AK-47 and AKM by the fully enclosed hooded front sight (all other AK pattern rifles, including those made in Russia, have a partially open front sight).

Many versions also feature a folding bayonet attached to the barrel just aft of the muzzle. There are three different types of bayonets made for Type 56 rifles.

== Adoption ==
=== China ===
The Type 56 was adopted to replace various WWII-era weapons, including the Mosin-Nagant, Type 38 rifle and M1903 Springfield, as the standard issue rifle in the People's Liberation Army (PLA) .

The Type 56 rifle was designated as the "Type 1956 Submachine Gun" (Chinese: 56式衝鋒槍), as the Type 56 took the role of SMG rather than infantry service rifle in the PLA in its early service years.

=== Export ===
During the Cold War period, the Type 56 was exported to many countries and guerrilla forces throughout the world.

Many of these rifles found their way to battlefields in Africa, Southeast Asia, and the Middle East and were used alongside other Kalashnikov pattern weapons from both the Soviet Union as well as the Warsaw Pact nations of Eastern Europe.

Chinese support for North Vietnam before the mid-1960s meant that the Type 56 was frequently encountered by American soldiers in the hands of either Viet Cong guerrillas or PAVN soldiers during the Vietnam War. The Type 56 was discovered far more often than the original Russian-made AK-47s or AKMs.

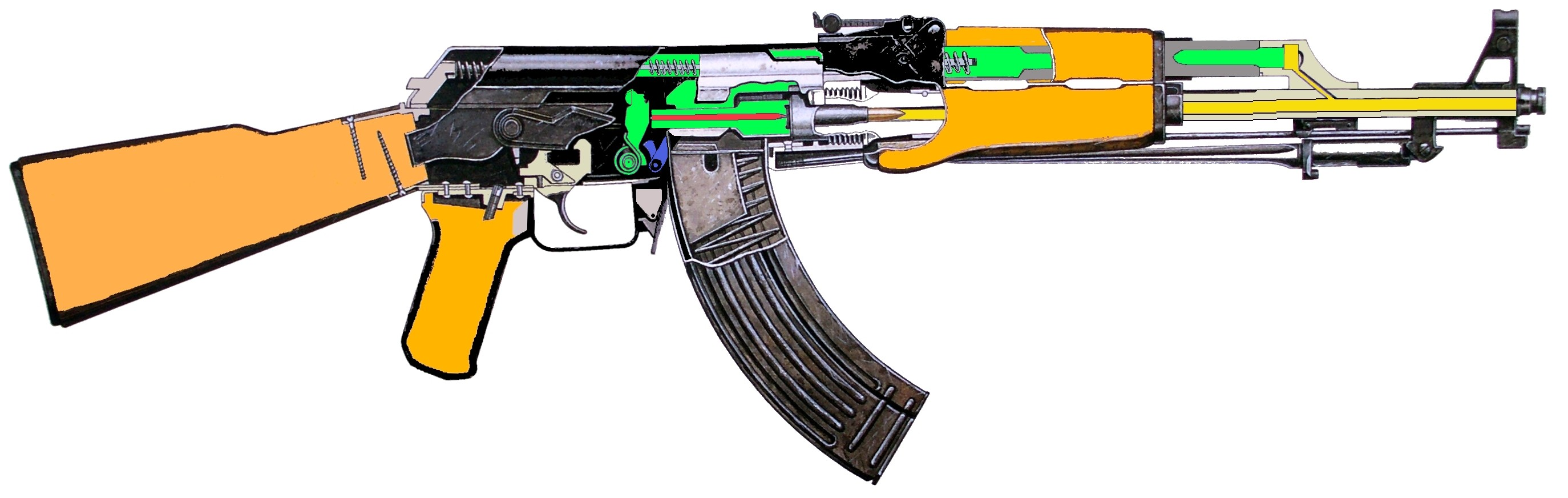
The gas-operated mechanism of a Type 56 rifle.

The Type 56 was used extensively by Iranian forces during the Iran–Iraq War of the 1980s, with Iran purchasing large quantities of weapons from China for its armed forces. During the war, Iraq also purchased a small quantity, despite them being a major recipient of Soviet weapons and assistance during the conflict. This was done in conjunction with their purchasing of a large number of AKMs from Eastern Europe.

During the Soviet–Afghan War in the 1980s, many Type 56 rifles were supplied to Afghan Mujahideen guerrillas to fight Soviet forces. The rifles were supplied by China, Pakistan and the US who obtained them from third party arms dealers. There is photographic evidence from Soviet/Russian sources where captured Type 56 rifles were utilized by Soviet soldiers in lieu of their standard-issue AKM and AK-74 rifles.

Use of the Type 56 in Afghanistan also continued well into the early 21st century as the standard rifle of the Taliban such as when Taliban forces seized control of Kabul in 1996 (a majority of the Chinese small arms used by the Taliban were provided by Pakistan).

== Variants ==
=== Norinco production ===
==== Type 56-1 ====
Copy of the AKS, with an under-folding steel shoulder stock and the bayonet removed to make the weapon easier to carry.

As with the original Type 56, milled receivers were replaced by stamped receivers in the mid-1960s, making the Type 56-1 an equivalent to the Russian AKMS.

Civilian semi-auto versions (Type 56S-I) may have the spike bayonet added, though it is worth noting that this is not the original military configuration.

==== Type 06 ====
The Type 06 is an assault rifle manufactured by Poly Technologies to be chambered in 5.56mm NATO.

==== Type 56-2 ====
Improved variant introduced in 1980, with a side-folding stock and dark orange bakelite furniture. The stock also houses a cleaning kit, which both underfolding AKs (all nations) and other sidefolding AKs lacked, instead requiring a separate pouch. It also allows a traditional detachable bayonet, both AK-47 and AKM styles, as an option in addition to the folding spike style.

Mainly manufactured for export and rare in China as the Type 81 was already in production by the time of conception.

===== 7.62 RK 56 TP =====
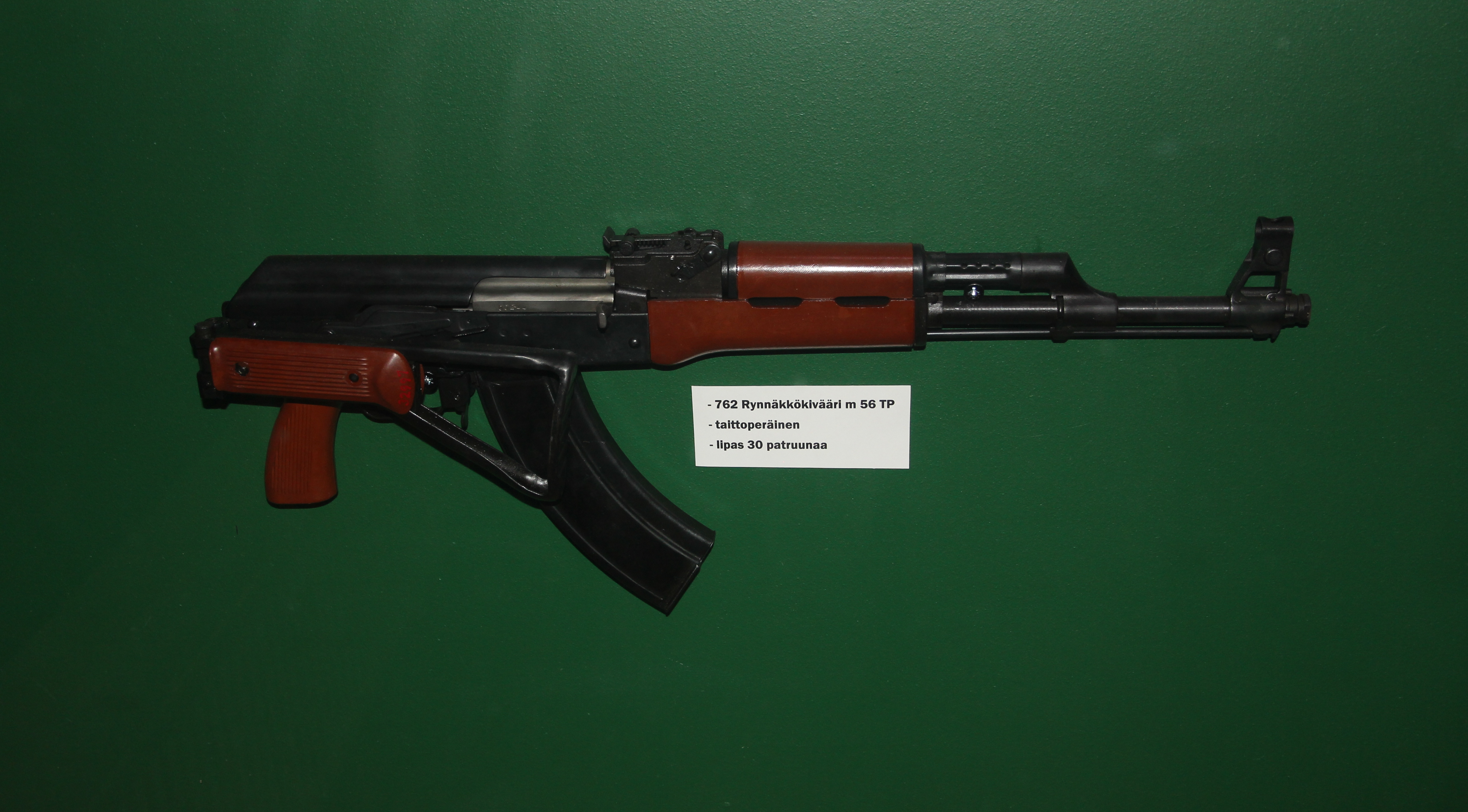
A Type 56-2 rifle with stock folded.

Modified Type 56-2 in China for Finnish use, with a new hammer spring that allows firing of Finnish 7.62x39.

==== Type 56C ====
Short-barrel version, introduced in 1991 for the domestic and export market.

The QBZ-56C, as it is officially designated in China, is a carbine variant of the Type 56-2 and supplied in limited quantities to some PLA units. The Chinese Navy is now the most prominent user. Development began in 1988, after it was discovered that the Type 81 assault rifle was too difficult to shorten.

In order to further reduce weight, the bayonet lug was removed. The QBZ-56C is often carried with a twenty-round box magazine, although it is capable of accepting a standard Type 56 thirty-round magazine. It also has a sidefolding stock in addition to a muzzle booster, giving it a similar appearance to the AKS-74U.

==== Type 56S ====
The Type 56 Sporter, also known as the AK47S, AKS-762 and MAK-90 (Modified AK-1990) is the semi-automatic only civilian version of the Type 56

Later versions were modified to meet the requirements of a 1989 Executive Order by President George H. W. Bush prohibiting importation of certain 'assault rifle' configurations of military-style semi-automatic rifles such as the Norinco AKM/AK-47.

These modifications included a one-piece U.S.-made thumbhole stock to replace the separate Chinese-made buttstock and pistol grip of the original AK rifle and the inclusion of a rivet on the receiver preventing use of standard AK-47, RPK, or AKM magazines.

===== 56S Galil sidefolder =====
Special version of the 56S/MAK-90 with an IMI Galil style side folding stock. Was exclusive to the US market.

===== The Legend =====
Another version of the 56S/MAK-90 except configured to look like the Type 3 AK-47.

It is extremely faithful to the Type 3 design, even having a milled receiver and original AK-47 style bayonet lug, but does retain some manufacturing differences from the Type 56 such as the pinned in barrel, lack of vent cuts on the gas tube heat guard, only 3 rivets on the trigger guard, the stamped recoil guide rod, spring loaded firing pin and variance in machining such as on the receiver and lightening cuts. Like the previous, US market only.

==== Type 56M ====
RPK style LMG version of the Type 56.

Utilizes a standard Type 56 stamped receiver and front trunnion, likely due to their rigidity, and its bi-pod is more RPD like then RPK, being tubular.

It seems to have two configurations with only minor cosmetic changes, one with standard AK-47/M open sights with "ears" and the bi-pod directly behind the front sight base, and a second configuration with typical Type 56 enclosed "hooded" sights and the bi-pod in front of the front sight base near the muzzle.

The latter version usually is seen with a birdcage flash hider or AK-74 style muzzle brake. Like the Type 56-2, it was only made for export as the Type 81 LMG was selected for military service instead.

===== Sporting variants =====
Civilian semi-auto sporter versions are known as the Type 87S or NHM 91. The semi-auto versions have also been sold with standard Type 56 stocks instead of the RPD "club foot" style as well as thumbhole variants after 1989. A rare version known as the "National Match" was once sold with a milled receiver and scope and scope mount.

==== Type 84 ====
Export version of the Type 56 rifle chambered for the 5.56×45mm NATO round. The lineup also features underfolder (Type 84-1) and sidefolder (Type 84-2) versions. Civilian semi-auto version known as Type 84S and AKS-223.

Special matte black synthetic versions were also available as the Type 84-3, Type 84-4 (underfolder) and Type 84-5 (sidefolder).

==== Type 86S ====
Semi automatic bullpup version.

=== Foreign production ===
==== KL-7.62 ====
Iranian copy of the Type 56.

The original version of the KL-7.62 was indistinguishable from the Type 56, but in recent years DIO appears to have made some improvements to the Type 56 design, adding a plastic stock and handguards (rather than wood) and a ribbed receiver cover (featured on most AKM variants, but missing from the Type 56), as well as picatinny rails on newer versions.

They consist of the KLS (AKM wooden stock) and the KLF (AKM folding stock).

==== MAZ ====
Sudanese licensed copy of the Type 56 made by Military Industry Corporation.

==== ASh78 ====
Albanian licensed copy of the Type 56.

==== TUL-1 ====
North Vietnamese-made variant, but with stock of an RPK, barrel sights from an RPD.

The TUL-1's body was thin, only 1 mm compared to the 1.5 mm of an RPK. It was also heavier and had an inferior rate of fire compared to the RPK. However, the firing rate and effective range of the weapon was better than an AK-47-based rifle. They're known to use 30-round magazines from AK-47-based rifles with the occasional 40-round magazine.

The TUL-1s were manufactured between 1970–1974 and ended after Vietnam obtained production rights to the RPK itself.

==== KA2-5 ====
Clone made in Myanmar by the Kachin Independence Army.

== Users ==
- (Islamic Republic of Afghanistan) / Afghanistan
- Albania Locally produced as the ASh-78 Tipi-1 under small modification of the Albanian Army needs. Standard issue rifle of the army.
- Algeria
- Bangladesh
- Benin
- Bolivia
- Bosnia and Herzegovina
- Brazil: Limited numbers seized from criminals and issued to the Civil Police of Rio de Janeiro
- Burundi: Burundian rebels.
- Cambodia
- Central African Republic
- Chad
- Congo-Brazzaville
- Congo-Kinshasa
- Djibouti
- East Timor
- Ecuador
- Estonia
- Gambia
- India: Captured rifles seized from both Militants and Pakistani Soldiers in Kashmir
- Iran: Type 56 and Type 56-1
- Iraq
  - Iraqi Kurdistan
- Ivory Coast
- Kosovo
- Laos
- Liberia
- (Libya) Libyan National Army: Type 56-1
- Mali
- Malta
- Myanmar
- Nepal: Used by the Nepalese Army and formerly by the People's Liberation Army rebels
- Niger
- North Korea
- Pakistan
- Qatar
- Russia
- Rwanda
- Sierra Leone
- Somalia
- South Sudan: South Sudan Liberation Movement, South Sudan Democratic Movement, Sudan People's Liberation Army and Lou Nuer militias.
- Sri Lanka
- Sudan
- Syria
- Tajikistan
- Tanzania
- Ukraine
- Uganda
- Vietnam
- Yemen: Supplied by Iran to Houthi rebels.
- Zimbabwe

=== Former Users ===
- Azerbaijan: Used during First Nagorno-Karabakh War and retired in favor of more modern Russian rifles.
- Croatia: Used by Croatia in its war of independence.
- Chechen Republic of Ichkeria
- China
- Finland: Purchased in the 1990s and used by Finnish Army reserve personnel. Now in long-term storage.
- Libyan Arab Republic of Jamahiriya: Passed into successor state.
- South Vietnam: Captured from Viet Cong and North Vietnamese Army during the Vietnam War.
- United States: Captured rifles issued to MACV-SOG.
- Zaire: Passed into successor state.

=== Non-state users ===
- Ambazonia Defence Forces
- (Islamic State) Boko Haram − Type 56 and Type 56-1
- Contras
- Free Aceh Movement
- Hamas
- Hezbollah
- Kachin Independence Army − Locally produced copies; some with M203-like UBGLs.
- (Democratic Kampuchea) Khmer Rouge
- Liberation Tigers of Tamil Eelam
- Lord's Resistance Army
- New People's Army
- Official Irish Republican Army
- Oromo Liberation Army
- People's Defence Force
- UNITA
- Viet Cong

== Criminal activities ==
In 1987, Michael Ryan used a legally owned Type 56 rifle, and two other firearms, in the Hungerford massacre in the United Kingdom, in which he shot 32 people, 17 of whom died. The attack led to the passage of Firearms (Amendment) Act 1988, which bans ownership of semi-automatic centre-fire rifles and restricts the use of shotguns.

In the United States, a Type 56 rifle, purchased in Oregon under a false name, was used in the 1989 Stockton schoolyard shooting in which Patrick Purdy fired over 100 rounds to shoot one teacher and 34 children, killing five. The shooting led to the passage of California's Roberti-Roos Assault Weapons Control Act of 1989.

In 1990, a Type 84s outfitted with a scope was used by David Malcolm Gray, along with 5 other rifles, in the Aramoana massacre in Aramoana, Otago Harbour, New Zealand, in which he shot 16 people, 12 fatally, before being shot dead by police. The attack was the deadliest mass shooting in New Zealand's history until the 2019 Christchurch mosque shootings and led to new firearms legislation in 1992, including 10-year photographic licences and tight restrictions on military style semi-automatic firearms.

A Type 56S, along with a Type 56S-1, were used by Larry Phillips, Jr. and Emil Mătăsăreanu during the 1997 North Hollywood shootout.

== See also ==
- Type 63 assault rifle
- Type 81 assault rifle
- Type 58 assault rifle
- Type 88 assault rifle
- Misr assault rifle

== Bibliography ==
- Jones, Richard D.; Ness, Leland S., eds. (2010). Jane's Infantry Weapons 2010-2011. Jane's Publishing. ISBN 978-0710629081.
- Tucker-Jones, Anthony (2012). Kalashnikov in Combat. Casemate Publishers. ISBN 978-1-78303-858-9.
