= APS-95 =

APS-95 Automatska Puška Samokres 1995
- Type: Assault rifle
- Place of origin: Croatia

Service history
- In service: 1993-
- Wars: Yugoslav Wars

Production history
- Designed: 1993
- Manufacturer: Končar-Arma d.o.o
- Produced: 1993-?

Specifications
- Mass: 3.8 kg (8.3 lb)
- Length: 980 mm (38.5 in) with stock unfolded; 730 mm (28.7 in) with stock folded
- Barrel length: 450 mm (17.7 in)
- Cartridge: 5.56×45mm NATO
- Caliber: 5.56mm
- Action: Gas-driven piston
- Rate of fire: 650 rounds/min
- Feed system: 35-round detachable box magazine
- Sights: 1.5× optical sight integrated in the carrying handle; fixed front sight and backup back iron sight

The APS-95 (The Ero) was an assault rifle manufactured in Croatia by Končar-Arma d.o.o since 1995 and offered for export up to at least 2007. (Note: The year when the Končar-Arma website, where the APS-95 had been featured, disappeared from the web.) The manufacturing company, a subsidiary of the Croatian ARMA-GRUPA Corporation, has been manufacturing the ERO and Mini-ERO submachine guns (copies of the Israeli UZI and Mini-UZI respectively) since the mid-1990s.

The manufacturer tried to push the APS-95 on the international market for several years with no success.

== History ==
The APS-95 was developed under request of the Croatian Army, which wanted to shift as soon as possible from the then-issued Yugoslavian-made 7.62×39mm Zastava M70 assault rifles to a service rifle chambered for the NATO-standard 5.56×45mm NATO cartridge.

During the Croatian War of Independence, the Croatian side had been supplied by the Croatian businessman Antun Kikaš with several batches of the Vektor R4, a South African copy of the Israeli IMI Galil assault rifle. The Croatian fighters appreciated the weapon and wanted a locally manufactured version of it as the new standard Croatian Army rifle.

The APS-95 was officially adopted by the Croatian Army around 1993, acquired and distributed in very small quantities before budgetary constraints stopped procurement.

While the APS-95 was not entirely adopted in the Croatian Army, some of them were used in the Yugoslav Wars.

== Design ==
The APS-95 was a conventional select-fire assault rifle operating via a gas-driven piston and employing a 35-rounds detachable magazine for 5.56mm ammunition, in all similar to the ones used in the Israeli Galil or South-African R4 assault rifles. The APS-95 was made around a stamped receiver, rather than the refined milled receiver of the Galil and R4, thus achieving reduction in cost and manufacturing time.

Its fire selector was based upon two distinct commands located on both sides of the rifle, similarly to the Galil and Vektor R4 but different in operation. They consist of P (Pojedinacno or semi-auto), R (Rafalno or full auto) and Z (Zakoceno or Safe).

The lever located on the right side of the receiver, based upon the AK-47 selector, consisted of three modes.

The small switch located over the grip on the left side of the receiver, at easy thumb reach, had two positions for semi-automatic and full-automatic fire. The folding stock was made out of stamped steel, and folded on the right side of the receiver; its profile did not cause any hindrance to the handling of the weapon nor to the operation of the bolt - as such, the APS-95 could be safely fired with the stock folded.

The most prominent features of the APS-95 over the Galil and the R4 were its distinctive handguard and front sight, and its carrying handle integrating a 1.5× optical sight and optional backup back iron sights. The pistol grip was also different, featuring finger grooves, much in the style of the M16 rifle The use of polymer magazines issued with the weapon indicates that it is likely from South African sources.

== Bibliography ==
- Roodhorst, Cor (2015). The Kalashnikov Encyclopedia: Recognition and Weapon Forensic Guide for Kalashnikov Arms and Derivatives I: Albania-Israel. Netherlands: Roodhorst Publications. ISBN 978-90-9027549-9.
