= K-3 (rifle) =

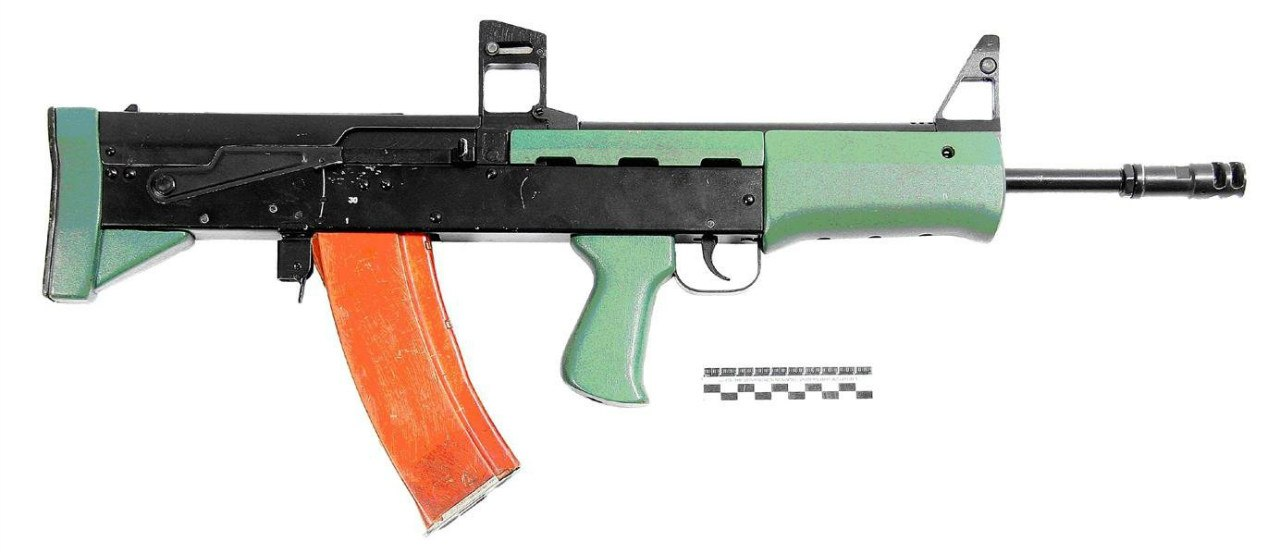
- Type: Bullpup assault rifle
- Place of origin: Armenia

Service history
- Used by: Armenia

Production history
- Designed: 1996
- Manufacturer: Garni-ler

Specifications
- Mass: 3.4 kg
- Length: 700 mm
- Barrel length: 415 mm
- Cartridge: 5.45×39mm
- Action: Gas-operated, rotating bolt
- Rate of fire: 600 rounds/min (automatic); 1000 rounds/min (burst mode); 40 rounds/min (singular)
- Effective firing range: 400 m
- Maximum firing range: 1000 m
- Feed system: 30-round or 45-round AK-74 detachable box magazine
- Sights: Iron sights

The K-3 is an Armenian bullpup assault rifle chambered for 5.45×39mm ammunition with a selective fire system, selecting between semi-automatic mode, burst mode, and full automatic fire mode. Little is known about the production and variants of these firearms, as its production is veiled in secrecy, but it is evident they are being used by the Armenian Special Forces, as was displayed in the 2006 military parade. A new variant of the K-3 was unveiled to the public nearly a decade after its initial debut.

== Design ==
First unveiled in October 1996, the K-3 5.45 mm assault rifle is based on the Kalashnikov action, reconfigured into a bullpup layout. The origins of the design remained a mystery, but there were reports that the K-3 was based on a single prototype produced under the Soviet Union during the late 1980s or early 1990s. By October 1996, over 40 examples of the K-3 had been manufactured in Armenia.

Conceived by the Military Industrial Department of the Armenian Ministry of Defence, the K-3 has been produced in a basic iron-sight form, with the option of mounting a standard PSO-1 ×4 telescopic sight, also produced in Armenia.

Due to the position of its ejection port, the K-3 can only be fired right-handed.

The muzzle of the barrel has an attachment that allows firing of rifle grenades. The new version of K-3 allows firing of grenades without the need for any separate attachments - the grenade can be fired by simply placing it on the barrel. Most of the furniture is nylon-based hard plastic, as is the 30-round curved box magazine, based on that of the AK-74 rifle series.
