= Misr assault rifle =

Egyptian assault rifle

Misr/Maadi
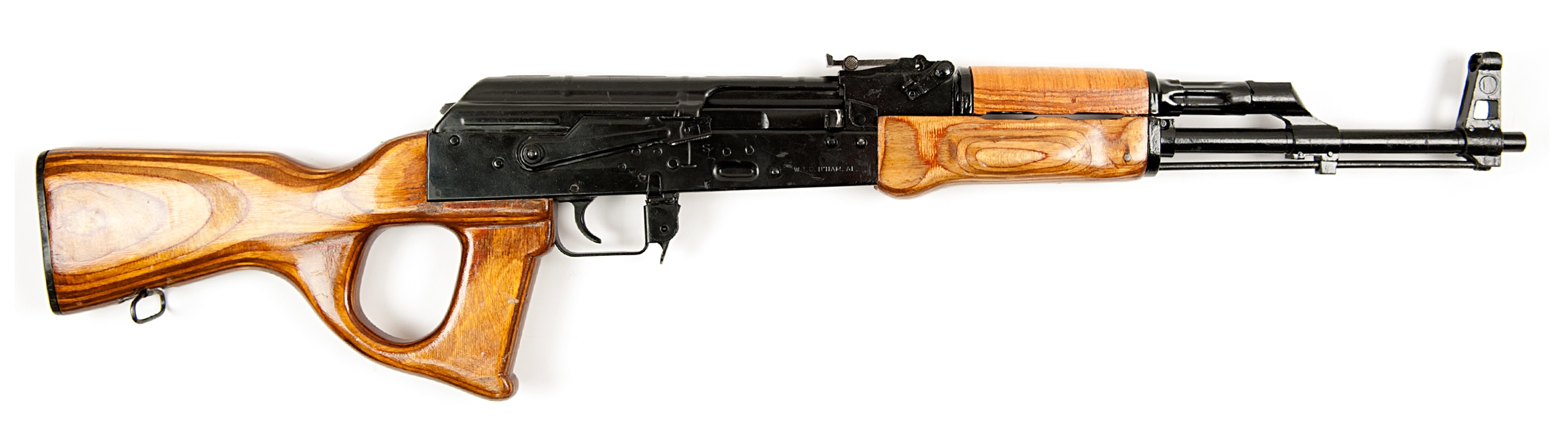
- A Maadi ARM
- Type: Assault rifle
- Place of origin: Egypt

Service history
- In service: 1960s–present
- Wars: War of Attrition; Yom Kippur War; Gulf War; Sinai insurgency

Production history
- Designed: 1959–present
- Manufacturer: Factory 54, Maadi Company for Engineering Industries
- No. built: 50,000 (1985)

Specifications
- Mass: 3.1 kg (6.8 lb)
- Length: 880 mm (34.6 in) wooden stock (ARM, and RML); 1,000 mm (39.4 in) wooden stock (RML only); 902 mm (35.5 in) metal stock extended / 655 mm (25.8 in) stock folded (AKMS)
- Barrel length: 415 mm (16.3 in)
- Cartridge: 7.62x39mm
- Action: Gas operated, rotating bolt
- Rate of fire: 600 rounds/min
- Muzzle velocity: 715 m/s (2,346 ft/s)
- Effective firing range: 100–1,000 m sight adjustments
- Feed system: 30-round box magazine, 60 round box magazine, 100 round drum
- Sights: Rear sight notch on sliding tangent, front post 378 mm (14.9 in) sight radius Compatible with most NATO optical sights.

The Misr (Arabic: مصر, lit. 'Egypt') is an Egyptian copy of the AKM, manufactured by Factory 54 of the Maadi Company for Engineering Industries in Cairo for the Egyptian Army and for export sales. They have been exported overseas.

== History ==
AK variants have been manufactured in Egypt shortly after the country aligned itself with the Soviet Union from 1959. The Soviets worked closely with the Egyptians with their technical staff trained in Russia, but ended in 1972 after Soviet representatives were kicked out.

A large number of MISR assault rifles were imported to the US during the 1980s and became the most common AKM seen in Hollywood films.

== Design ==
The standard Misr rifle has a wooden forward handguard and buttstock while the pistol grip and upper handguard are plastic.

The differences between the AKMS and the Misr are the use a different folding stock, the use of plastic for the handguard and pistol grip rather than wood and a modified upper receiver that accepts most US and NATO optics. It can also use the Maadi UBGL.

== Variants ==
=== ARM ===
Semi-automatic version, sold as a sporting firearm to the civilian market. The Maadi variants in various guises have also been imported into the US as modified sporting variants in significant numbers.

=== Maadi ===
The military version, used by Egyptian forces is a license-produced version of the AKM with a side folding stock, chrome-plated bore and either 30-round box or 75-round drum magazine.

== Users ==
- Afghanistan: Used by Afghan National Police.
- Egypt: Egyptian Armed Forces, Egyptian National Police and Central Security Forces.
- Rwanda: 450 Misr rifles.

=== Non-state users ===
- Hamas

== Bibliography ==
- Jones, Richard D.; Ness, Leland S., eds. (2010). Jane's Infantry Weapons 2010-2011. Jane's Publishing. ISBN 978-0710629081.
- Tucker-Jones, Anthony (2012). Kalashnikov in Combat. Casemate Publishers. ISBN 978-1-78303-858-9.
