= RPD machine gun =

Russian light machine gun

RPD
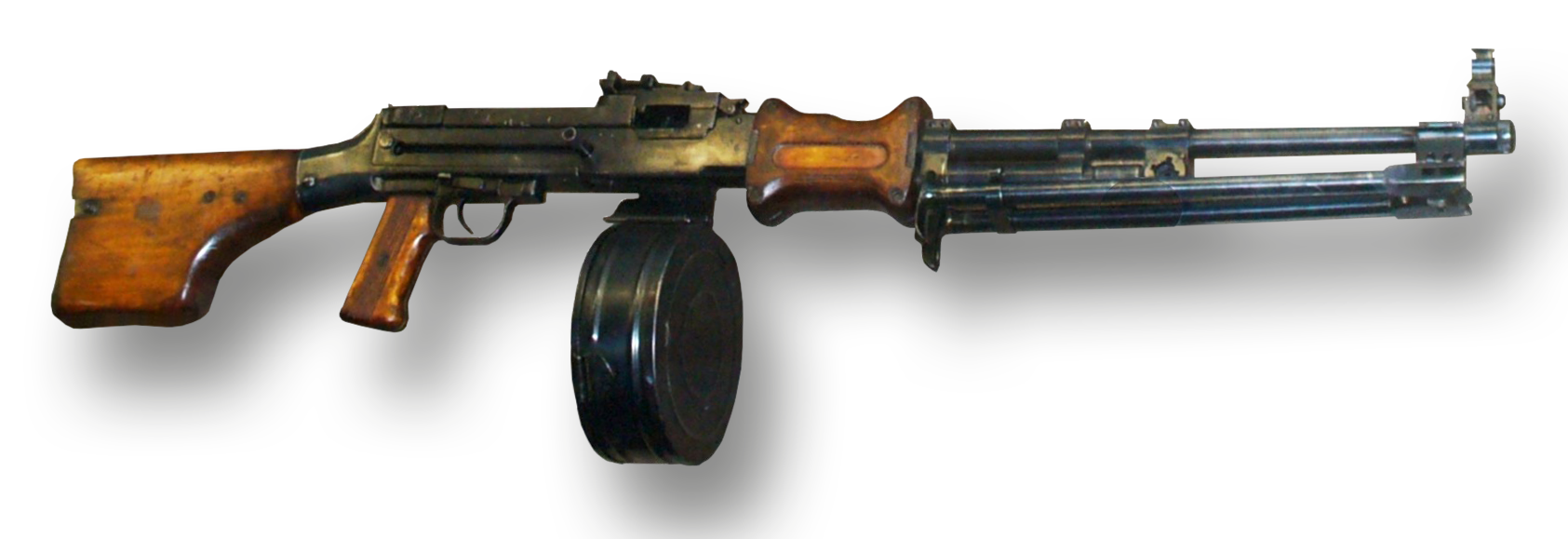
- RPD with a 100-round belt in a drum container
- Type: Light machine gun
- Place of origin: Soviet Union

Service history
- In service: 1944–1961 (Soviet Union); 1944–present (other nations)
- Used by: See Users
- Wars: See Wars

Production history
- Designer: Vasily Degtyaryov
- Designed: 1943–1944
- Produced: 1944–1960
- Variants: See Variants

Specifications
- Mass: 7.4 kg (16.31 lb) when empty
- Length: 1,037 mm (40.8 in)
- Barrel length: 520 mm (20.5 in)
- Cartridge: 7.62×39mm 5.56×45mm NATO (Israeli conversion)
- Action: Gas operated long stroke piston, flapper locking and fires from the open bolt
- Rate of fire: 650–750 rounds/min
- Muzzle velocity: 735 m/s (2,411 ft/s)
- Effective firing range: 100–1,000 m sight adjustments
- Feed system: Non-disintegrating 100-round segmented belt stored in a drum container. Custom 125 round belt (MACVSOG version)
- Sights: Open-type sights with rear sliding notch and semi-hooded front post, 596.6 mm (23.5 in) sight radius

The RPD (Russian: Ручной Пулемёт Дегтярёва, РПД, romanized: Ruchnoy Pulemyot Degtyaryova, RPD, lit. 'Degtyaryov hand-held machine gun, RPD') is a 7.62x39mm light machine gun developed in the Soviet Union by Vasily Degtyaryov for the 7.62×39mm M43 intermediate cartridge.

== History ==
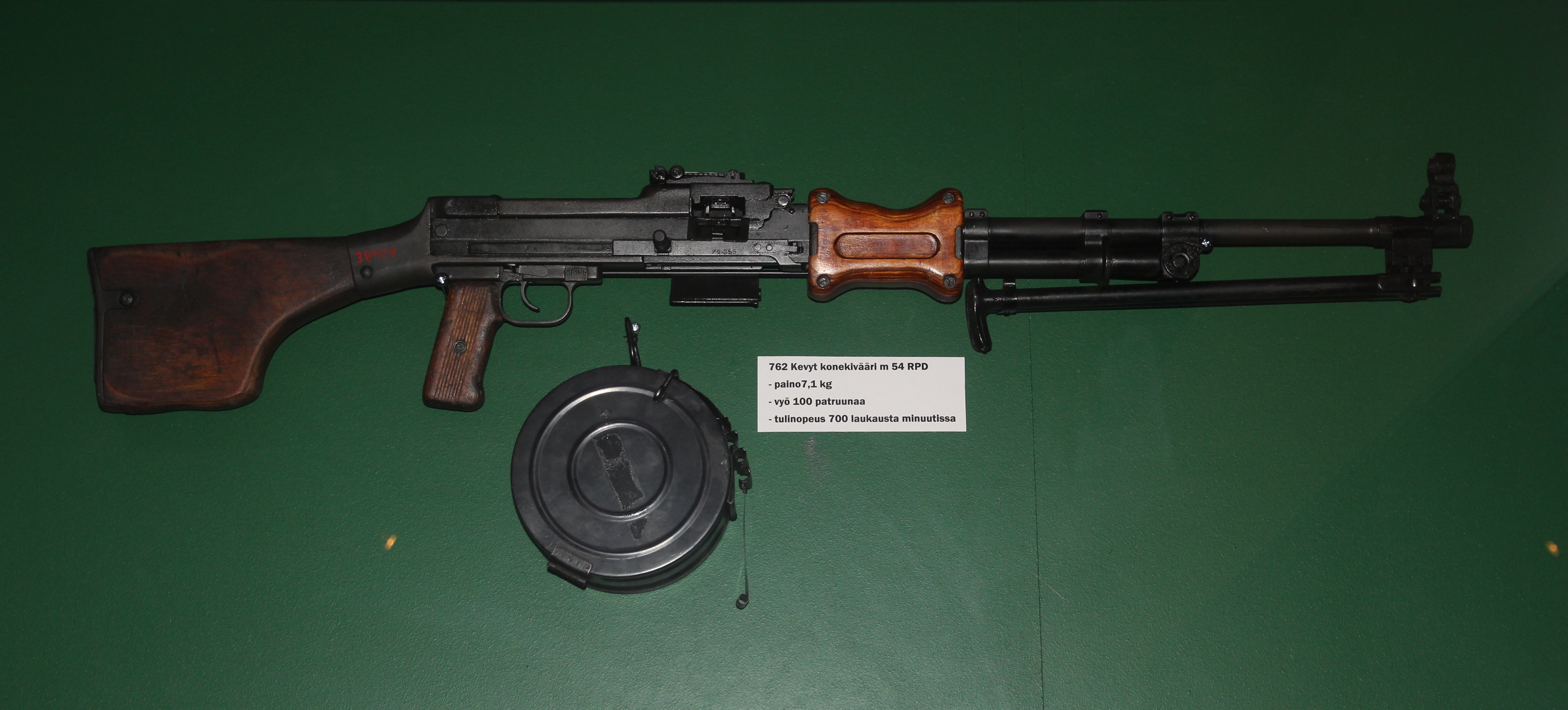
RPD light machine gun at the Mikkeli Infantry museum

The RPD was created as a replacement for the DP machine gun chambered for the 7.62×54mmR round. It is a precursor of most squad automatic weapons.

The development of the RPD commenced in 1943. Three prominent Soviet engineers were asked to submit their own designs: Vasily Degtyaryov, Sergei Simonov and Alexei Sudayev.

Among the completed prototypes prepared for evaluation, the Degtyaryov design proved superior and was accepted into service with the Soviet armed forces as the 7.62 mm RPD (Russian: Ручной Пулемёт Дегтярёва, РПД, romanized: Ruchnoy Pulemyot Degtyaryova, RPD, lit. 'Degtyaryov hand-held machine gun, RPD') model 1944.

Although the RPD was ready for mass production during the final stages of World War II, it was adopted in 1948 and large scale delivery of the machine gun did not begin until 1953.

=== Adoption ===
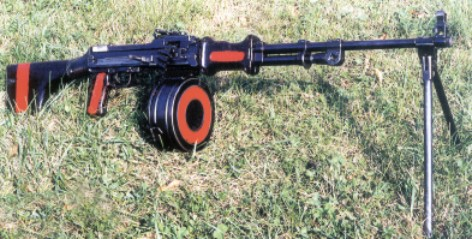
RPD from Polish Army depot

During the Vietnam War, the RPD and its Chinese copy (Type 56) served the Viet Cong and the People's Army of Vietnam as their standard light machine gun.

After the introduction of the Kalashnikov RPK and PK machine guns in the 1960s, the RPD was withdrawn from most first-tier units of the former Warsaw Pact.

However, the RPD remains in active service in many African and Asian nations.

== Design details ==
=== Operating mechanism ===
The RPD is a light machine gun that features a gas-operated long-stroke piston system and fires from an open bolt. The locking system is recycled from previous Degtyaryov small arms, consisting of a pair of hinged flaps set in recesses on each side of the receiver. The movement of these flaps and the resulting locking and unlocking action is controlled by carefully angled surfaces on the bolt carrier assembly.

The RPD is hammer fired from an open bolt. The hammer forms part of the rear of the bolt carrier (which is connected to the gas piston), which continues moving forward for a short distance after the round is chambered and the bolt locked, the hammer face then striking the rear of the free floating firing pin which passes through the length of the bolt.

Locking occurs by means of lateral flaps located along the sides of the bolt, which are forced outwards (by the angled sides of the hammer) into recesses cut into the receiver body, after which firing occurs when the face of the hammer strikes the rear of the firing pin. The mechanism is simple, rugged and reliable.

It features a trigger mechanism that is limited to fully automatic fire only. The bolt is equipped with a spring-loaded casing extraction system, and a fixed insert inside the receiver housing which passes between the feed horns of the bolt serves as the ejector.

Spent cartridge casings are ejected downward through an opening in the bolt carrier and receiver. The RPD has a manually operated lever-type safety mechanism that secures the RPD against accidental firing by blocking the bolt catch when engaged. Unlike Degtyarov's earlier firearm patents, the RPD's return spring is located inside the butt.

Like many other Soviet-made firearms, the chamber and bore are chrome-lined, greatly decreasing the risk of corrosion and jamming.

The RPD has a non-removable barrel with a three-position gas adjustment valve used to control the performance of the gas system. It is also equipped with a folding integral bipod, wooden shoulder stock, foregrip and pistol grip. The firearm strips down into the following major groups: the receiver and barrel, bolt, bolt carrier, feed tray and feed cover, the recoil mechanism and the trigger group and stock.

=== Feeding ===
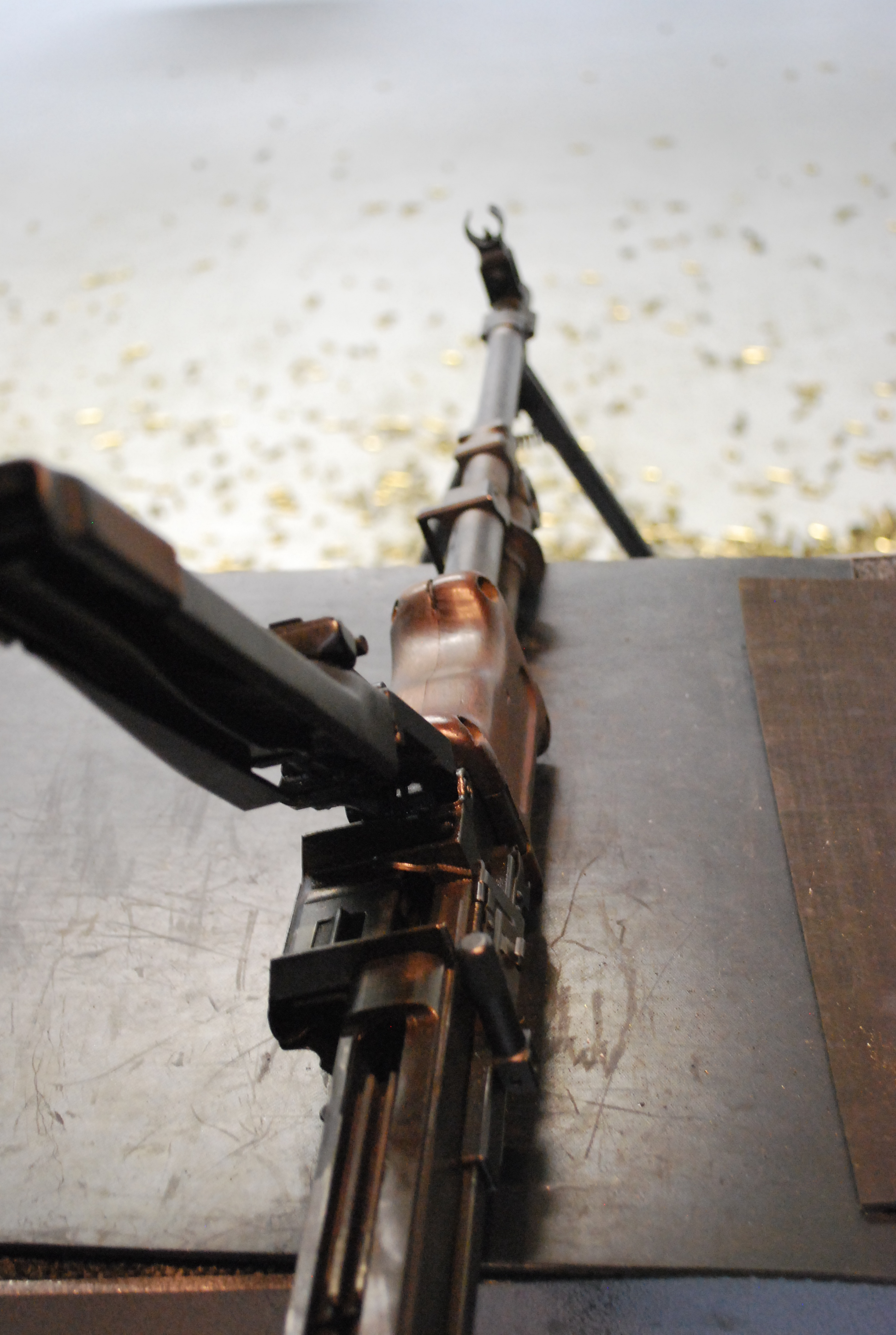
Feeding system of RPD

The RPD fires from an open bolt in fully automatic mode only. There is no provision for semi-auto fire, although RPD operators were trained to fire in short bursts to prolong the life of the non-quick-change barrels. The RPD feeds ammunition from the left side using a metallic, open-link, non-disintegrating belt typically holding 100 rounds of 7.62x39 ammunition. Unlike many other belt-fed automatic machine guns, where the rounds must be pulled out the rear of the belt and then pushed forward into the chamber, the RPD uses a simpler "push through" design where the rounds are pushed out the front of the belt and into the chamber. At least three variants of the RPD belt were produced. The Soviets and Hungarians both produced 50-round belt segments, while the Chinese produced 25-round belt segments.

The Soviet RPD belts held the rounds in place using the extractor groove. The Hungarians designed a simpler belt that held the cartridges in place using an L-shaped tab at the rear of the belt. The Chinese copied the Hungarian design for their belts, albeit in 25-round lengths instead of 50. RPD belt segments are connected using a round of ammunition that holds the last link of the first belt and the first link of the next belt together. When the last round in a belt segment is fired, that belt segment disconnects and falls away, reducing the chances of the empty belt snagging or becoming entangled. Regardless of the style of belt used, the RPD was typically fed using 100 rounds of linked ammunition.

The Soviet, Hungarian, and Chinese RPD belts are all interchangeable, and can be linked together without affecting the feeding of the RPD.

The combined belt segments are stored in a metal drum that is attached to a mount on the receiver, for a total of 100 rounds. The RPD can also feed belts that are not contained in a drum if, for example, there is a need for more than 100 rounds of linked ammunition at a time. The feed system is operated by a roller connected to the reciprocating bolt carrier assembly. The belt is pulled into the gun during the rearward motion of the bolt carrier. The noteworthy flaw in the drum's design is its unreliability in dirty conditions; it can quickly become clogged from debris.

=== Sights ===
The RPD is equipped with a set of open-type iron sights. These consist of a front post and a notched rear sight mounted on a tangent. Both the front and rear sights of the RPD are adjustable for windage and elevation. The front sight is adjusted up or down for elevation using a tool included in the issued cleaning kit. To adjust the front sight for windage, the smaller of the two wrenches on the multi-tool included in the issued cleaning kit is used to loosen the retaining bolt on the front sight clamp. The front sight can then be adjusted left or right for the correct windage, after which the retaining bolt is reinstalled to lock the sight into place. The rear sight is adjusted for elevation using a slider.

The rear sight is marked in 100 meter increments from 100 to 1,000 meters. The rear sight is adjusted for windage using a knob on the left side of the rear sight. Because the front sight of the RPD must be partially disassembled in order to adjust windage, in practice the front sight would have been zeroed for windage and then locked in place. Adjustment for windage in the field would have been accomplished using the knob on the rear sight.

A number of RPDs were fitted with a side rail (attached to the left side of the receiver) to accept an NSP-2 night vision sight.

=== Accessories ===
Standard accessories issued with the RPD include a sling, extra ammunition drums and belts (with either belt or shoulder pouches for same), oil bottle, cleaning rod (carried in a slot on the left side of the receiver), (stowed in a compartment inside the stock), and drop case.

The cleaning kit consists of a rectangular metal clam-shell case that typically contains the following tools and spare parts: pin punch (used for disassembling the bolt), cleaning jag, multi-tool (includes screwdriver, small and large wrenches used for adjusting the front sight and gas system, respectively, and a notch for installing and removing the cleaning jag on the cleaning rod), broken case extractor, front sight adjustment tool, gas tube scraping tool, gas port reamer, spare extractor, spare extractor spring, spare firing pin.

There are a number of spring steel "fingers" on the lid of the clam-shell case, which press on the contents of the cleaning kit when closed to prevent rattling. One end of the clam-shell case has a notch from which the screwdriver end of the multi-tool can protrude.

== Variants ==
During its service life, the RPD was modernised several times. Initially, the gas block was modified as was the rear sight, where the windage adjustment knob for the rear sight was moved to the left side of the notch.

Later, the RPD was modified with a non-reciprocating cocking mechanism with a folding charging handle (replacing the fixed charging handle connected to the bolt carrier) that does not move during firing. The feed port received a dust cover, which, when open, serves as a feeding ramp for the ammunition belt.

=== RPDM ===
A further modified variant (sometimes referred to as the RPDM) includes an extended gas cylinder and a recoil buffer mechanism in the stock. Late production RPD variants also had the fixed drum attachment removed (instead, the ammunition container was "hung" from the feed port cover) and feature a folding cleaning rod, that is stored inside the buttstock (in the Chinese Type 56-1 variant).

=== DS Arms RPD ===
American firearm manufacturer DS Arms makes a semi-auto variant for civil market and a full-auto variant for export, both in the original design and also in a modernized version called RPD Carbine.

The RPD Carbine has a fluted 17.5-inch barrel, modern front sight, alloy handguard with rails, M249-type pistol grip and M4 recoil spring tube and buttstock.

=== Civilian variants ===
Because semi-auto RPD variants are manufactured using de-milled parts kits from full-auto RPD machine guns, in order to comply with ATF regulations, the full-auto parts must be modified such that the resulting semi-auto rifle cannot be readily converted into a machine gun.

Numerous machining operations are necessary to modify the de-milled full-auto RPD parts for use in a semi-auto RPD receiver. For example, the side rails on the bolt carrier must be machined to fit into the slots of the semi-auto receiver, which are purposefully made too narrow to accept an unmodified full-auto RPD bolt carrier.

Additional portions of the bolt carrier that are necessary for full-auto firing, such as the sear engagement surface, must be machined off during the semi-auto conversion process.

Semi-auto RPD variants must also fire from a closed bolt, which requires the addition of a striker mechanism and other fire control group parts that are not found on full-auto RPD machine guns.

=== Foreign production ===
Apart from the former Soviet Union, the RPD was manufactured in other Warsaw Pact countries locally under license.

==== China ====
The RPD was produced locally in the People's Republic of China as the Type 56 (Chinese: 56式班用機槍, lit. 'Type 56 squad machine gun') with the Type 56-1 as its improved variant.

The Type 56 was superseded by the Type 81 LMG and QBB-95 LSW in PLA service, formerly produced by Norinco.

==== Egypt ====
The RPD is produced locally in Egypt as the Maadi RPD.

==== North Korea ====
The RPD was produced locally in North Korea as the Type 62.

==== East Germany ====
The RPD was produced in East Germany as the lMG D (German: leichtes Maschinengewehr Degtjarjow, lit. 'light machine gun Degtyaryov').

==== Poland ====
The RPD was produced in Poland as the rkm D (Polish: ręczny karabin maszynowy Diegtiariowa, lit. 'hand held machine gun Degtyaryov'), between 1958 and 1962.

== Users ==
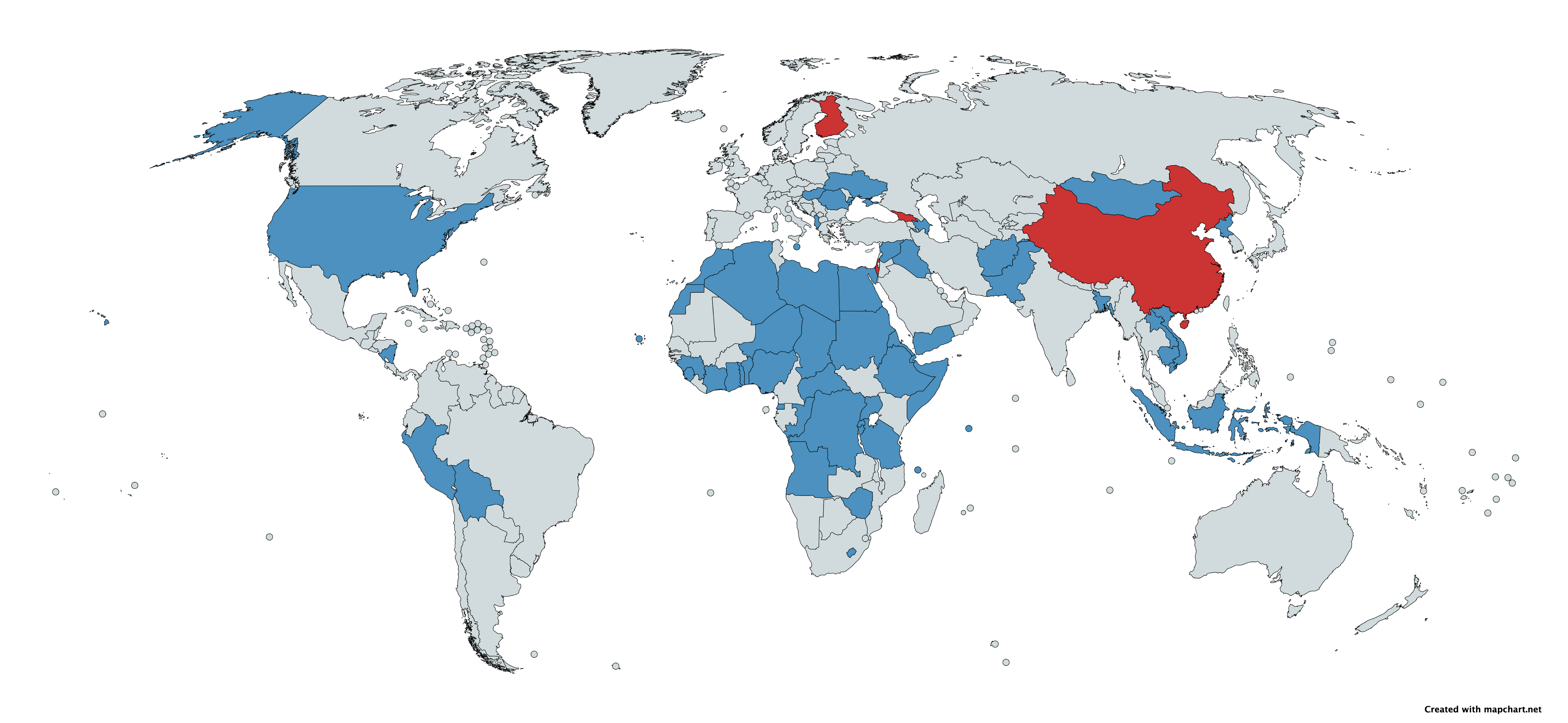
A map with RPD users in blue and former users in red

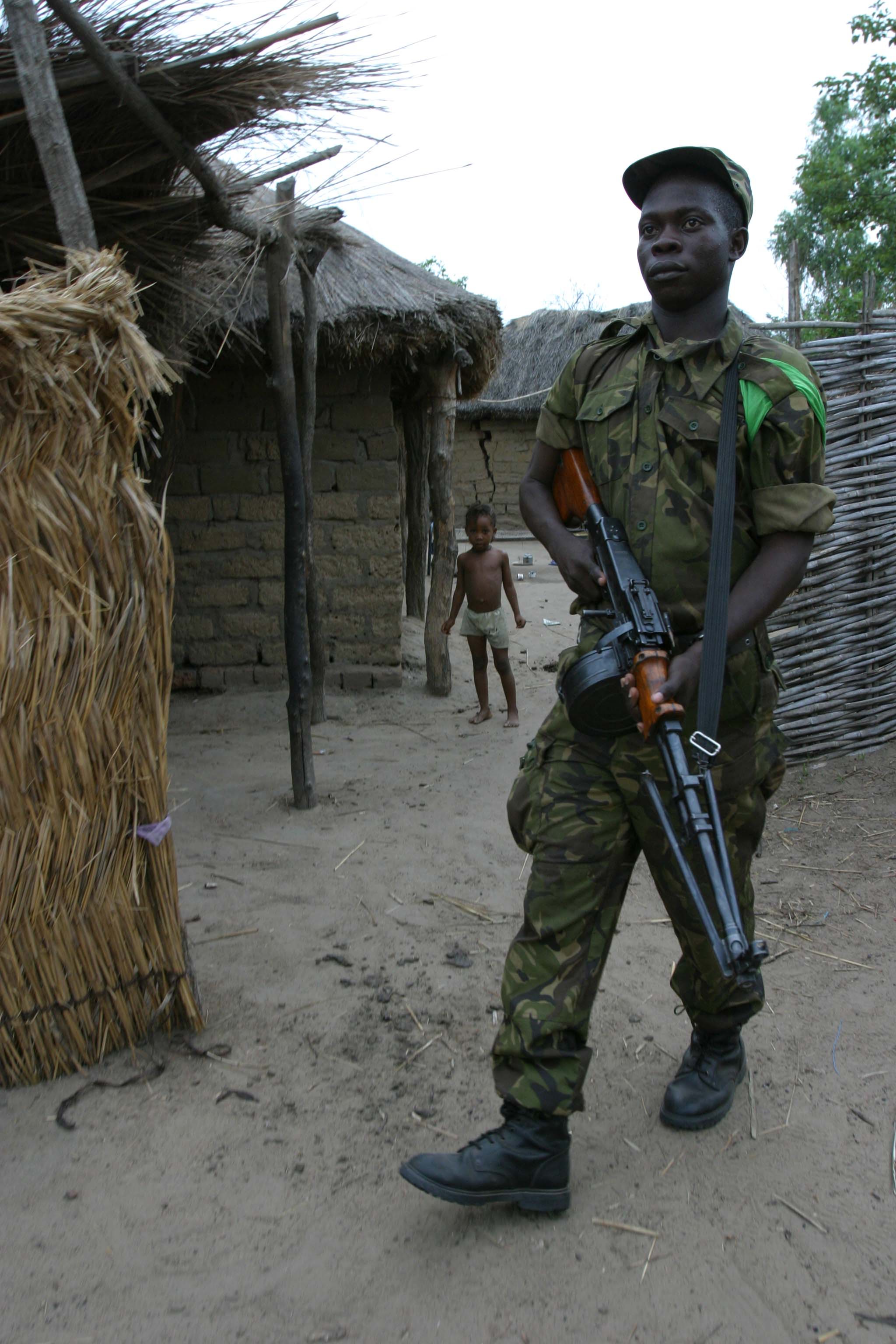
A Central African soldier in a patrol armed with an RPD during a joint military operation in the streets of Birao, 2007

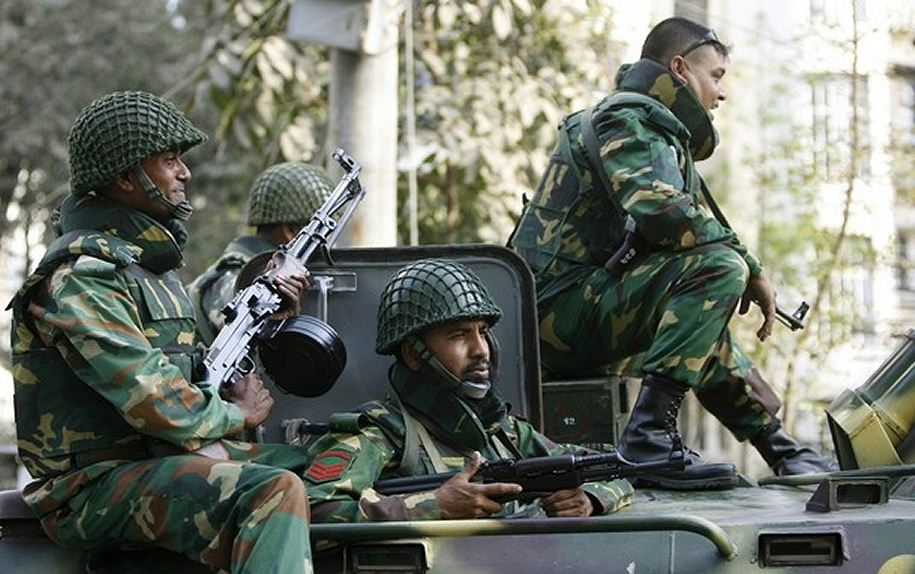
A soldier of the Bangladesh Army with an RPD on a BTR-80 during Bangladesh Rifles Mutiny, 2009

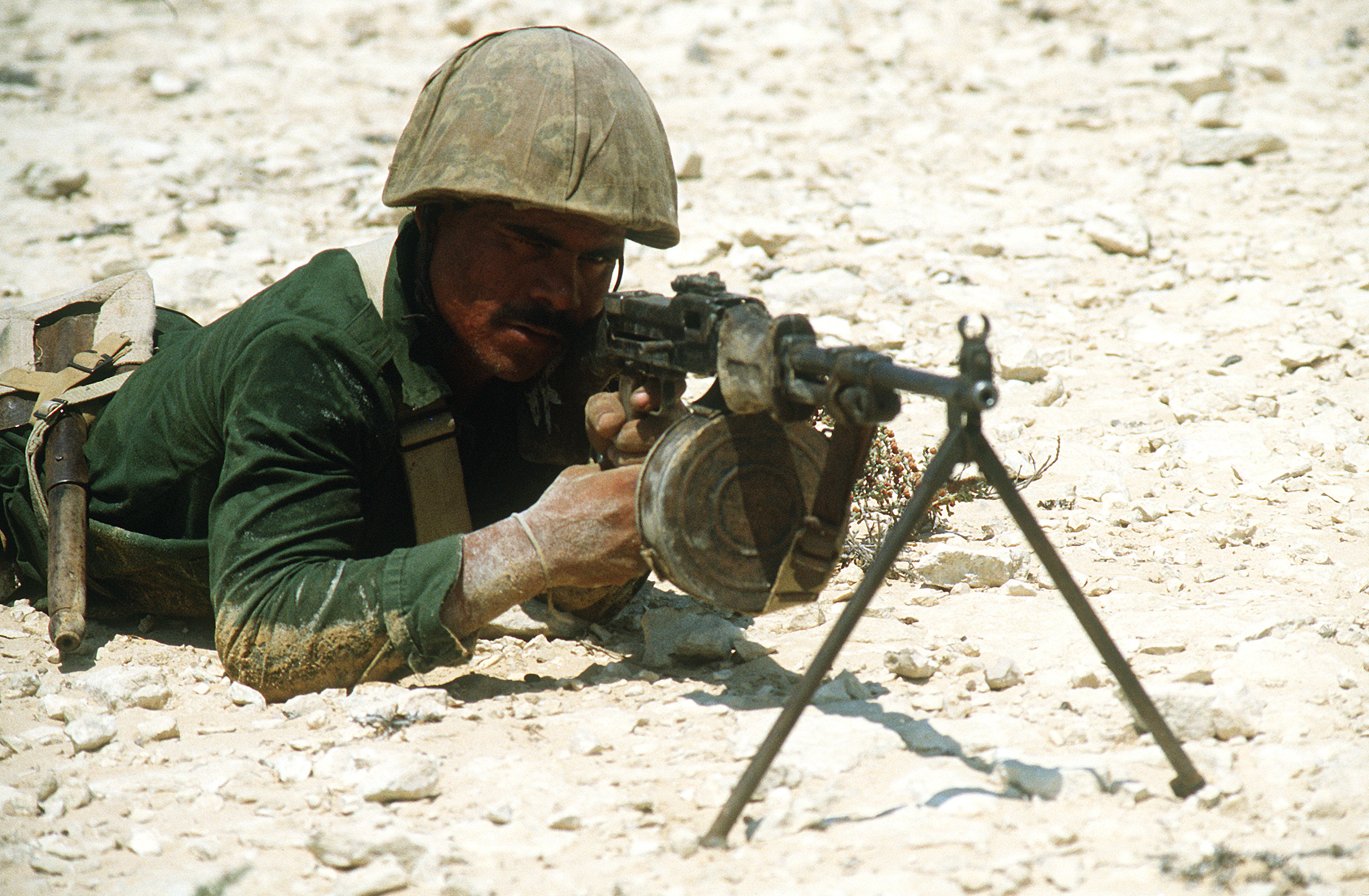
An Egyptian marine aiming a RPD during the combined and joint training exercise Operation Bright Star '85

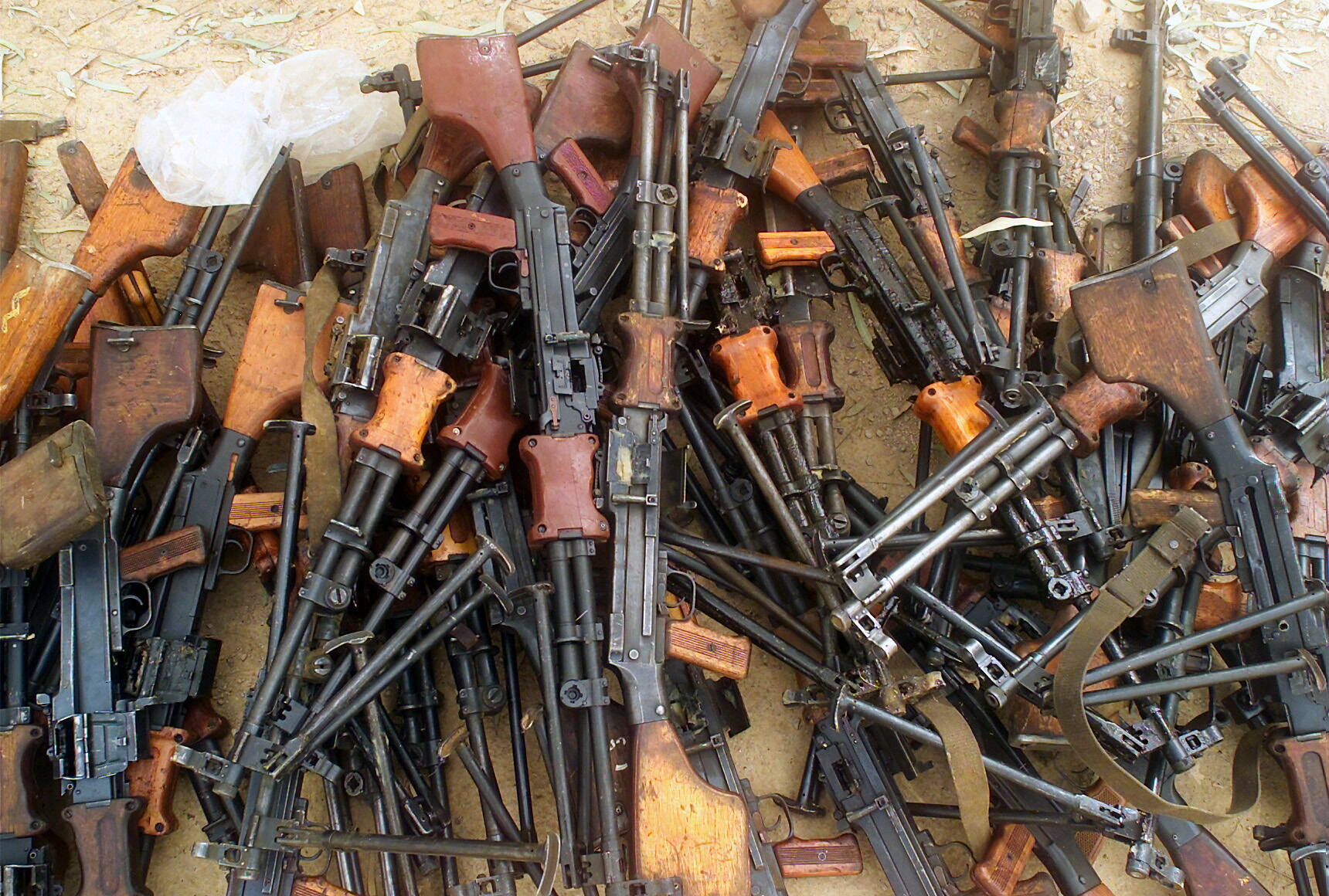
A captured Fedayeen weapons cache of RPD, outside of Jaman Al Juburi, Iraq during Operation Iraqi Freedom

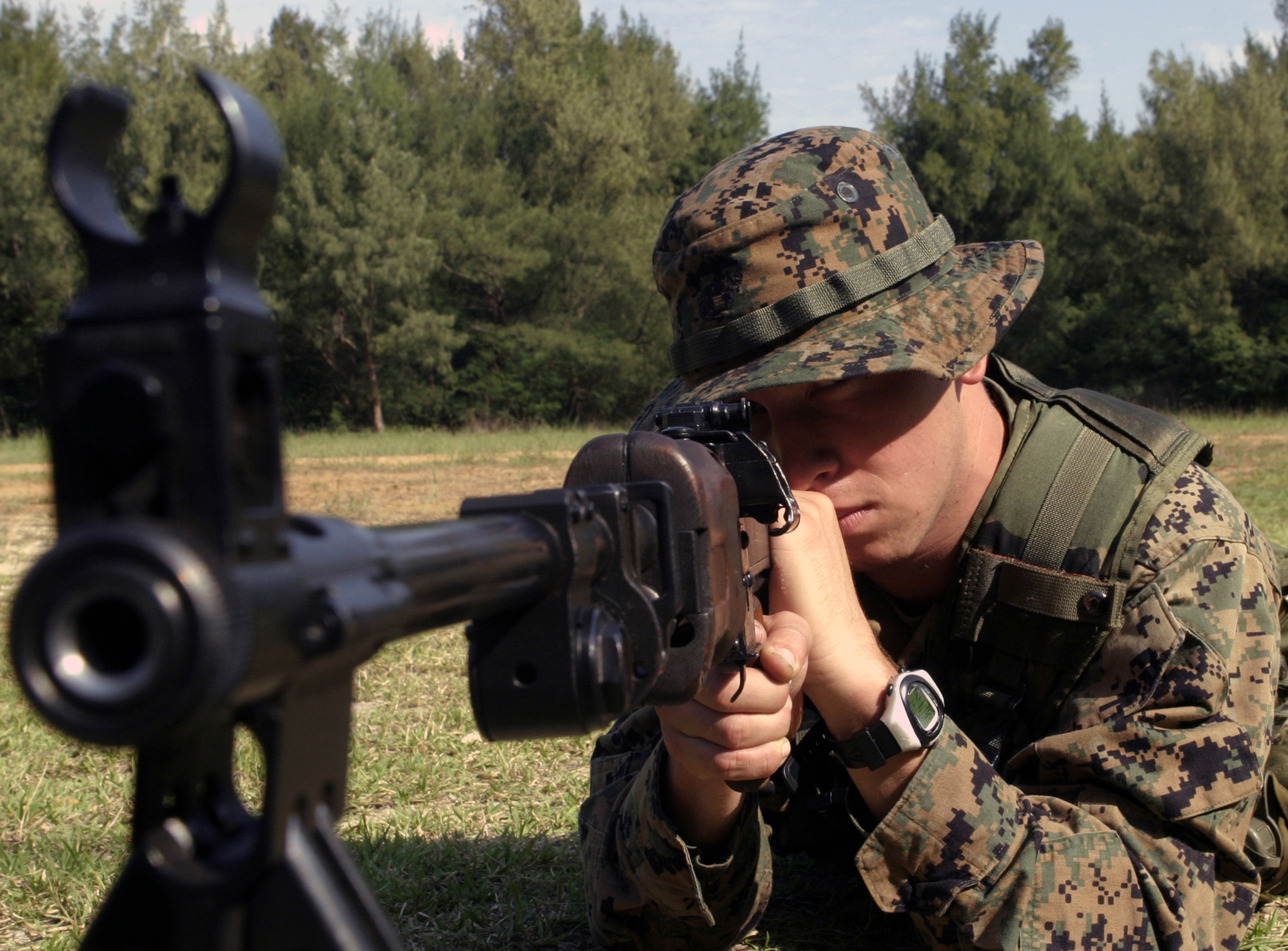
A U.S. Marine sighting in with an RPD, 2005

- Afghanistan
- Albania
- Algeria
- Angola
- Azerbaijan
- Bangladesh
- Benin
- Bolivia
- Burundi: Burundian rebels.
- Cambodia: Including Type 56s.
- Cape Verde
- Central African Republic
- Chad
- Comoros
- Congo-Brazzaville
- Congo-Kinshasa
- Djibouti
- Egypt
- Equatorial Guinea
- Eritrea
- Ethiopia
- Ghana
- Guinea
- Hungary
- Indonesia
- Iraq
- Ivory Coast
- Laos
- Lesotho
- Libya
- Malta
- Mongolia
- Morocco
- Nicaragua
- Nigeria
- Niger
- North Korea
- Pakistan
- Peru
- Romania
- Rwanda
- Sahrawi Arab Democratic Republic
  - Used on Land Rovers.
- Seychelles
- Sierra Leone
- Somalia
- Sri Lanka
- Sudan
- Syria
- Tanzania
- Togo
- Uganda
- Ukraine
- Vietnam
- Yemen
- Zimbabwe

=== Former users ===
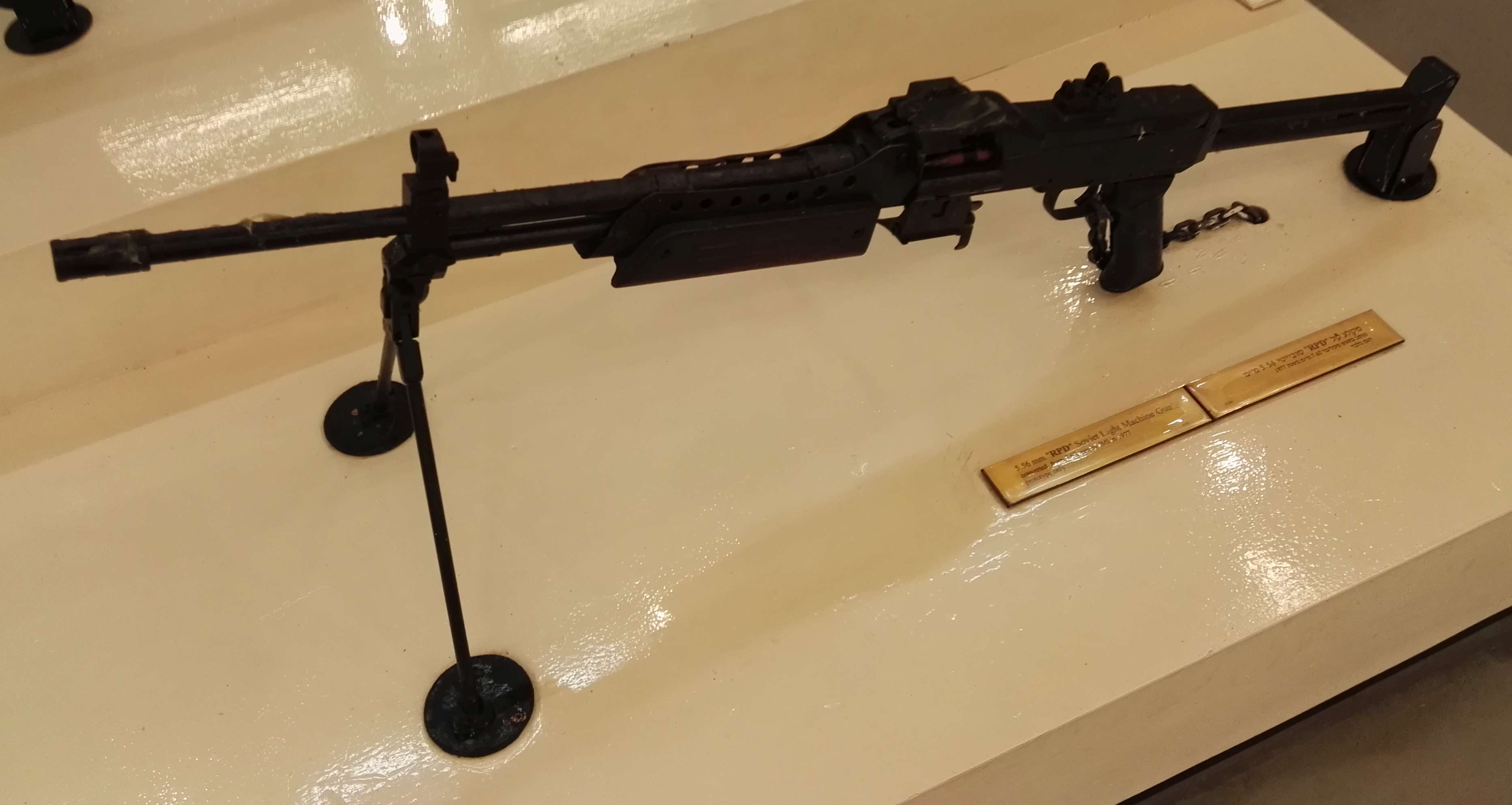
RPD converted to 5.56×45mm NATO by IMI at the Israel Defense Forces History Museum

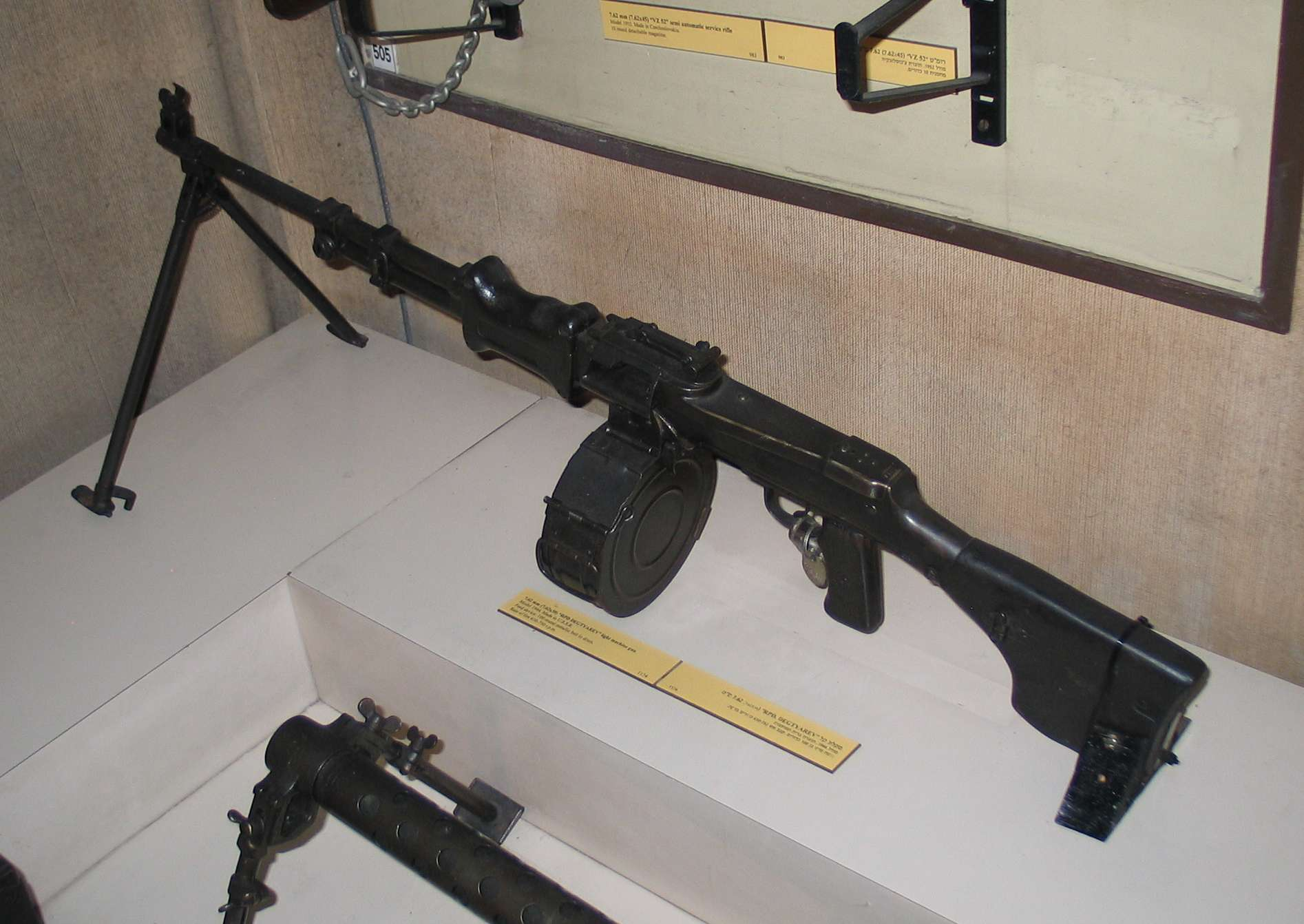
RPD at the Israel Defense Forces History Museum

- China
- East Germany
- Finland
  - Locally designated name 7.62 KK 54 RPD.
- Georgia
  - Used by different armed groups in 1990s, out of service.
- Iran
- Israel
- Rhodesia
- Soviet Union
- United States
  - Modified version issued to MACVSOG, with shortened barrel and 125 round belt.

=== Non-state users ===
- People's Movement for the Liberation of Azawad

== Wars ==
- Vietnam War
- Portuguese Colonial War
- Guatemalan Civil War
- Colombian conflict
- Laotian Civil War
- Suez Crisis
- Sino-Indian War
- Cambodian Civil War
- Communist insurgency in Thailand
- Six-Day War
- Battle of Karameh
- Black September
- Indonesian invasion of East Timor
- Insurgency in Aceh
- Yom Kippur War
- Rhodesian Bush War
- South African Border War
- Angolan Civil War
- Mozambican Civil War
- Nathu La and Cho La clashes
- Bangladesh Liberation War
- Western Sahara War
- Lebanese Civil War
- Ethiopian Civil War
- Shaba II
- Cambodian–Vietnamese War
- Sino-Vietnamese War
- Soviet–Afghan War
- Nicaraguan Revolution
- Salvadoran Civil War
- Somali Civil War
- Tuareg rebellion (1990–1995)
- Iran–Iraq War
- Sri Lankan civil war
- Gulf War
- Yugoslav Wars
- Rwandan Civil War
- Burundian Civil War
- Congo Civil War
- War in Afghanistan (2001–2021)
- Iraq War
- Ivorian Civil Wars
- Thai–Laotian Border War
- War in North-West Pakistan
- Cambodian–Thai border stand-off
- First Libyan Civil War
- Syrian civil war
- Russo-Ukrainian War
- Yemeni Civil War (2014–present)
- Saudi Arabian-led intervention in Yemen
- OLA insurgency
- Tigray War
- War in Amhara
- 2025 Cambodia–Thailand border conflict
- First Nagorno-Karabakh War

== See also ==
- Degtyarev-Garanin KB-P 790
- FN Minimi
- IWI Negev
- HK MG4
- PKP Pecheneg machine gun
- RPL-20
- Daewoo Precision Industries K3
- Ultimax 100
- IP-2
- List of modern Russian small arms and light weapons
