= RPK =

Soviet light support weapon and variants

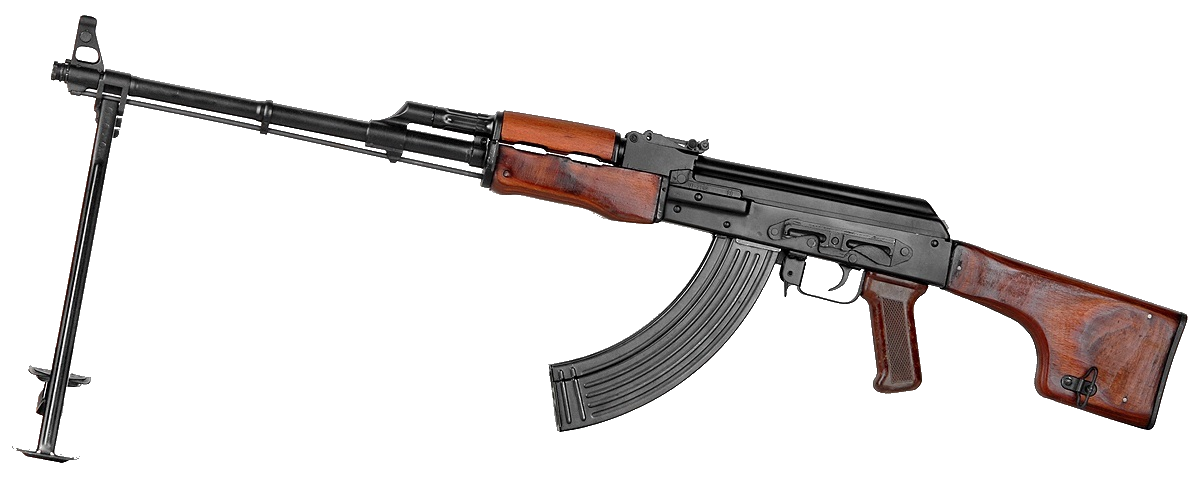
- RPK with a 40-round box magazine
- Type: Light machine gun Squad automatic weapon
- Place of origin: Soviet Union

Service history
- In service: 1959–present
- Used by: See Users
- Wars: See Conflicts

Production history
- Designer: Mikhail Kalashnikov
- Designed: 1956–58
- Manufacturer: Vyatskiye Polyany Machine-Building Plant
- Produced: 1961–1978
- Variants: See Variants

Specifications
- Mass: 4.8 kg (10.6 lb)
- Length: 1,040 mm (40.9 in) (stock extended)
- Barrel length: 590 mm (23.2 in)
- Cartridge: 7.62×39mm M43
- Action: Gas-operated, rotating bolt; closed bolt
- Rate of fire: 600 rounds/min
- Muzzle velocity: 745 m/s (2,444 ft/s)
- Effective firing range: 100–1,000 m sight adjustments, Windage adjustable at the rear sight
- Feed system: 30-, 40-round box magazine, 75-round drum magazine
- Sights: Iron sights: semi-shrouded front post and rear sliding tangent with an adjustable notch

The RPK (Russian: РПК; Ручной пулемёт Калашникова, romanized: Ruchnoy Pulemyot Kalashnikova, lit. 'Kalashnikov's hand-held machine gun') is a Soviet 7.62×39mm light machine gun/squad automatic weapon that was developed by Mikhail Kalashnikov in the early 1960s, in parallel with the AKM assault rifle. The RPK was created to standardize the small arms inventory of the Soviet Army, where it replaced the 7.62×39mm RPD machine gun.

The RPK continues to be used by the military of the post-Soviet states and several African and Asian nations. The RPK is also manufactured in Bulgaria, Hungary, Romania, and Serbia.

== Design details ==
The RPK is chambered in 7.62×39mm intermediate cartridge. It uses a standard AKM pistol grip and can also use standard AKM detachable box magazines, but it is most commonly used with a 40-round box magazine or a 75-round drum magazine. The U-shaped receiver is stamped from a smooth 1.5 mm (0.06 in) sheet of steel, compared with the 1 mm (0.039 in) sheet metal receiver used on the standard AKM. It features a thick laminated wood foregrip and a fixed laminated wood "club-foot" buttstock similar to the stock used on the RPD, which is designed to allow the user to fire from the prone position more comfortably. Interchangeability of parts between the RPK and AKM are moderate.

=== Operating mechanism ===
The RPK functions identically to the AK-47. It uses a modified AKM recoil spring assembly that consists of a rear spring guide rod from the AK and a new forward flat guide rod and coil spring. It has a similar design layout to the Kalashnikov series of rifles, with modifications to increase the RPK's effective range and accuracy, enhance its sustained fire capability, and strengthen the receiver.

=== Barrel and muzzle device ===
The RPK features a thicker and longer barrel than the AKM. This allows for it to be fired for longer without permanent loss in accuracy due to the barrel heating up. The chrome-lined barrel is permanently fixed to the receiver and cannot be replaced in the field. It is fitted with a new front sight base, and the gas block lacks both a bayonet lug and an under-barrel cleaning rod guide. The barrel also features a folding bipod mounted near the muzzle, and a front sight base with a lug that limits the bipod's rotation around the axis of the barrel. The barrel has a threaded muzzle, enabling the use of muzzle devices such as flash hiders, compensators, and blank-firing adapters. When a muzzle device is not being used, the threads on the muzzle can be covered by a thread protector. The barrel is pinned to the receiver in a modified trunnion, reinforced by ribbing, and is slightly wider than the trunnion used on the standard AKM type rifles. Symmetrical bulges on both sides of the front trunnion ensure a proper fit inside the receiver.

==== Sights ====
The RPK's iron sights leaf is elevation adjustable, and graduated for ranges of 100 to 1,000 meters in 100 m increments. The rear sight leaf also features a windage adjustment knob unique to the RPK series of rifles.

==== Accessories ====
Supplied with the RPK are: spare magazines, a cleaning rod, cleaning kit (stored in a hollowed compartment in the buttstock), a sling, oil bottle, and magazine pouches (a single-pocket pouch for a drum magazine or a 4-pocket pouch for box magazines).

== Variants ==
The RPK light machine gun, chambered in the 7.62×39mm cartridge, is essentially a Russian equivalent to a squad automatic weapon. It was adopted by the former Soviet Union, and was issued mainly to motorized units. It was later adopted by several military agencies around the world.

=== RPKS ===
The RPKS ("S" — Skladnoy (Russian: складной) meaning "folding" stock) is a variant of the RPK with a side-folding wooden stock was intended primarily for paratroopers. Changes to the design of the RPKS are limited only to the shoulder stock mounting, at the rear of the receiver. It uses a trunnion riveted to both receiver walls that has a socket and tang, allowing the stock to hinge on a pivot pin. The trunnion has a cut-out on the right side which is designed to engage the stock catch and lock it in place when folded. The wooden stock is mounted in a pivoting hull, which contains a catch that secures the buttstock in the extended position. The rear sling loop was moved from the left side of the stock body to the right side of the stock frame.

=== RPK-74 ===
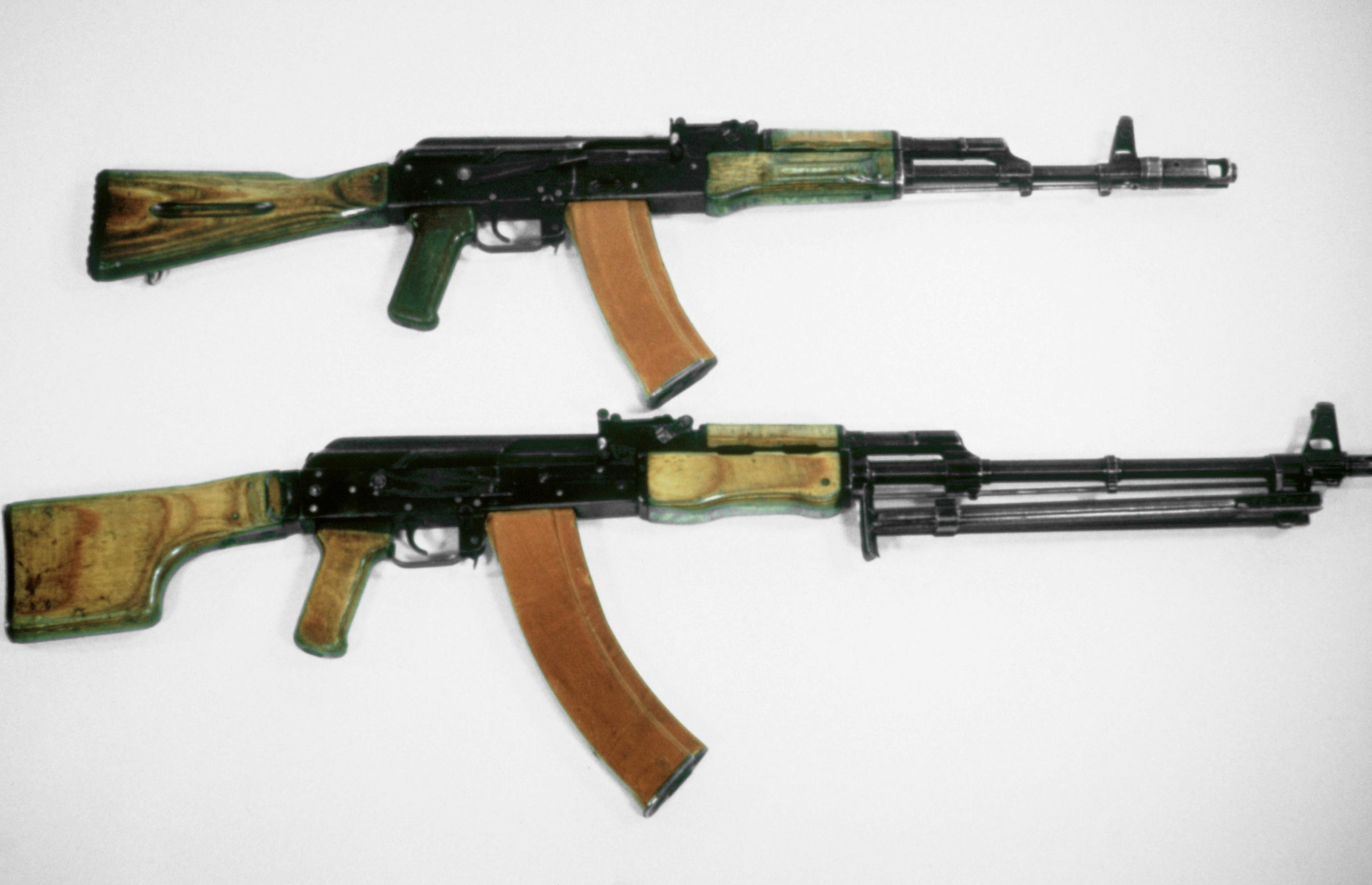
A comparison view of the AK-74 (top) and RPK-74 (bottom)

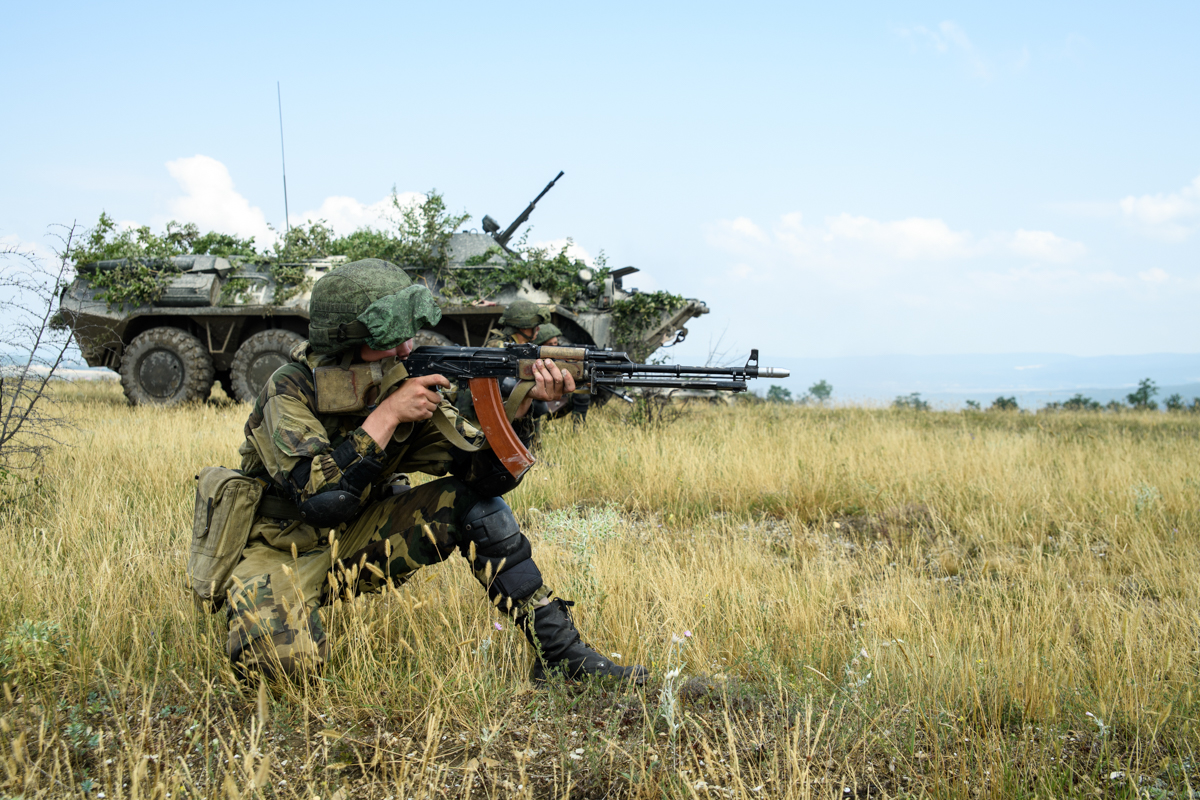
A Belarusian special forces soldier with an RPK-74 at the Slavic Brotherhood 2018

The RPK-74 (Russian: РПК-74) was introduced in 1974 together with the AK-74 assault rifle, both chambered in the 5.45×39mm intermediate cartridge. The RPK-74 was a light machine gun / squad automatic weapon based on the AK-74, with modifications that mirror those made to the AKM.

The RPK-74 uses a longer and heavier chrome-plated barrel, which has a new gas block with a gas channel at a 90° angle to the bore axis, and a ring for the cleaning rod. It is also equipped with a folding bipod and a different front sight tower. The muzzle is threaded for a flash suppressor or blank-firing device.

The rear stock trunnion was strengthened and the magazine well was reinforced with steel inserts.

Additionally, the RPK-74 has a modified return mechanism compared to the AK-74, which uses a new type of metal spring guide rod and recoil spring. The rear sight assembly, forward handguard and receiver dust cover were all retained from the RPK.

The RPK-74 feeds from a 45-round steel or polymer box magazine, interchangeable with magazines from the AK-74, and is designed to be charged from stripper clips. Drum magazines similar to those used on the previous RPK models were tested during its development phase, but were discontinued in favour of the 45-round box magazine. However, recently the production of a 97-round drum has started. This drum was designed to be used with the AK-107 but can also be used in any 5.45×39mm AK-74 and RPK-74 magazine compatible variants. Kalashnikov also tested with experimental conventional drums, a prototype 100-round belt fed drum magazine was also created. It attaches into the regular magazine well, but the cartridges are stored on a 100-round belt inside a box. A feed system removes them from the belt and puts them in a position where they can be loaded through the regular magazine well. This system is actuated by a lever from the magazine that clips around the charging handle. It is unknown if this ever went into service.

Standard equipment includes: eight magazines, six stripper clips (15 rounds per clip), a speedloader guide, cleaning rod, cleaning kit, sling, oil bottle and two magazine pouches. Some variants do not come with the cleaning kit option.

It is in widespread use by member states of the former Soviet Union, as well as Bulgaria.

=== RPKS-74 ===
The RPKS-74 is the paratrooper variant of the RPK-74, equipped with a wooden folding stock from the RPKS.

=== RPK-74M ===
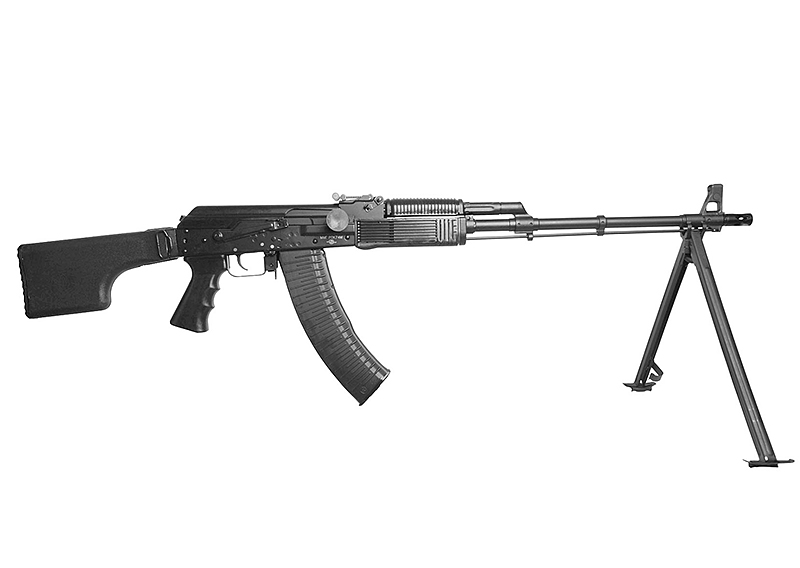
RPK-74M with its bipod deployed

The RPK-74M (Modernizirovannij "Modernized") is a modernised variant of the RPK-74 developed during the mid-'90s. In line with the AK-74M assault rifle variant, the RPK-74M lower handguard, gas tube cover, pistol grip, and new synthetic stock are made from a black, glass-filled polyamide. The stock is shaped like the RPK-74 fixed stock, but also side-folds like the RPKS-74. The stock additionally has an easier to use release mechanism, replacing the bullet press release from the RPKS and RPKS-74. Each RPK-74M is fitted standard with a side-rail bracket for mounting optics. It also includes most of the 74M economic changes, such as the dimpled on barrel hardware, omission of lightening cuts from the front sight block and piston and stamped gas tube release lever. Updated magazines were produced by Molot with horizontal ribs going up the sides of the magazines.

=== RPKN and RPK-74N ===
The RPK and RPK-74 are also available in a night fighting configuration. These variants are designated as the RPKN, RPKSN, RPK-74N, and RPKS-74N. They have a side rail mounting on the left side of the receiver that accepts a NSP-3, NSPU, or NSPUM night vision sight. Models designated RPKN-1, RPKSN-1, RPK-74N and RPKS-74N can mount the multi-model night vision scope NSPU-3 (1PN51) while RPKN2, RPKSN2, RPK-74N2 and RPKS-74N2 can mount the multi-model night vision scope NSPUM (1PN58).

=== RPK-201 and RPK-203 ===
An export variant chambered in 5.56×45mm NATO was also introduced, designated as the RPK-201. A modernised export variant of the RPK was also developed, designated as the RPK-203. Both the RPK-201 and RPK-203 uses the same polymer construction as the RPK-74M.

=== RPK-16 ===
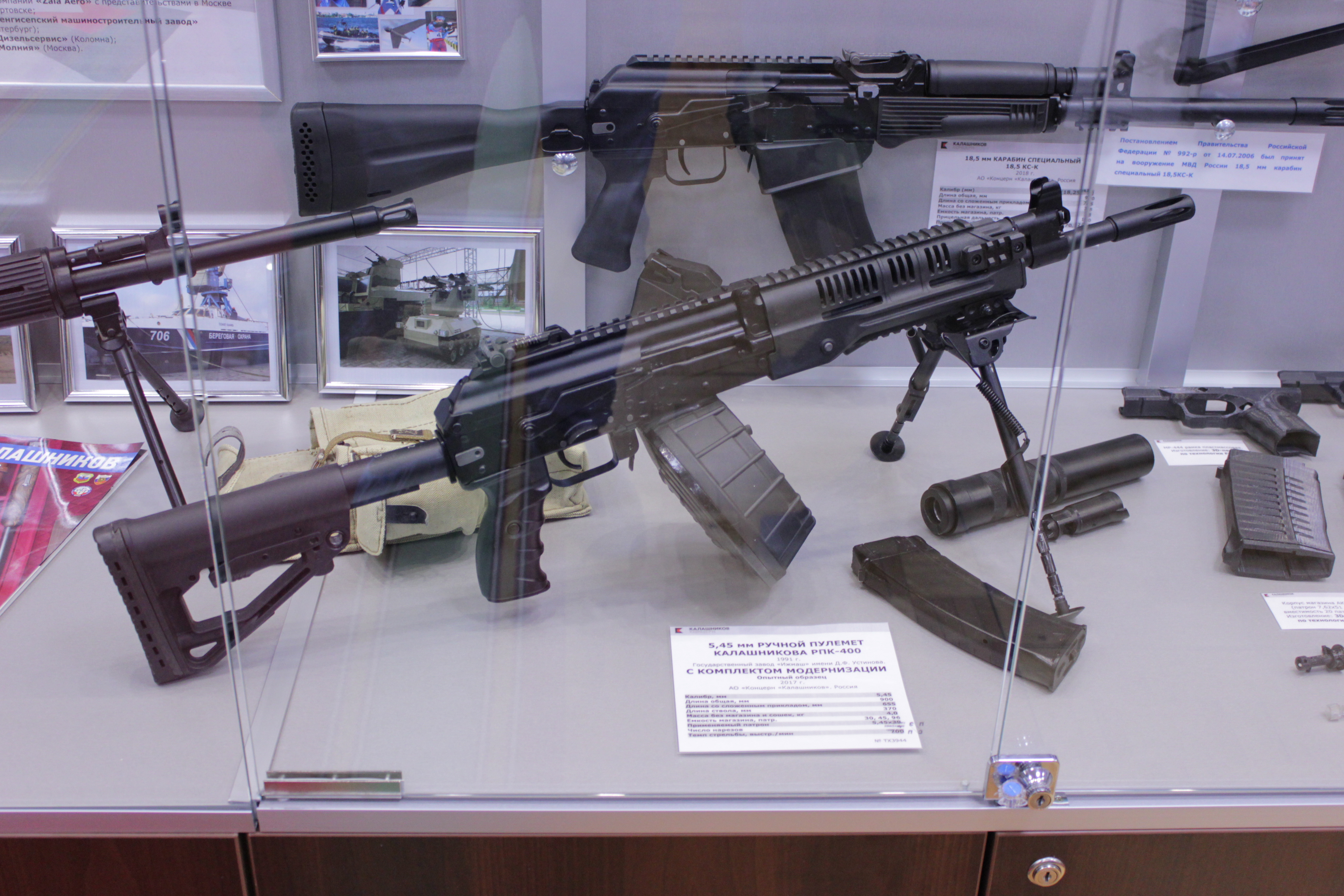
RPK-400 prototype with a 370 mm (14.6 in) barrel displayed at the Izhmash Museum in Izhevsk

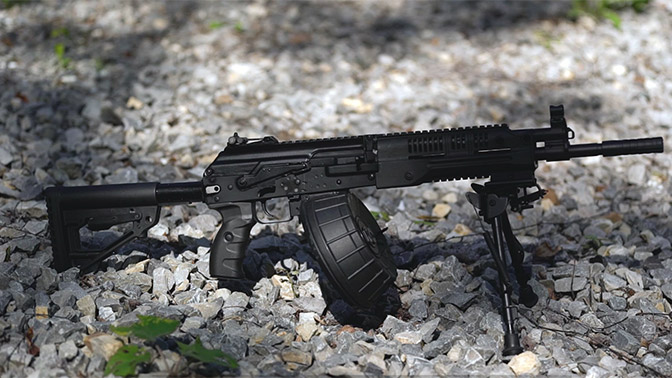
RPK-16 with a 95-round drum magazine

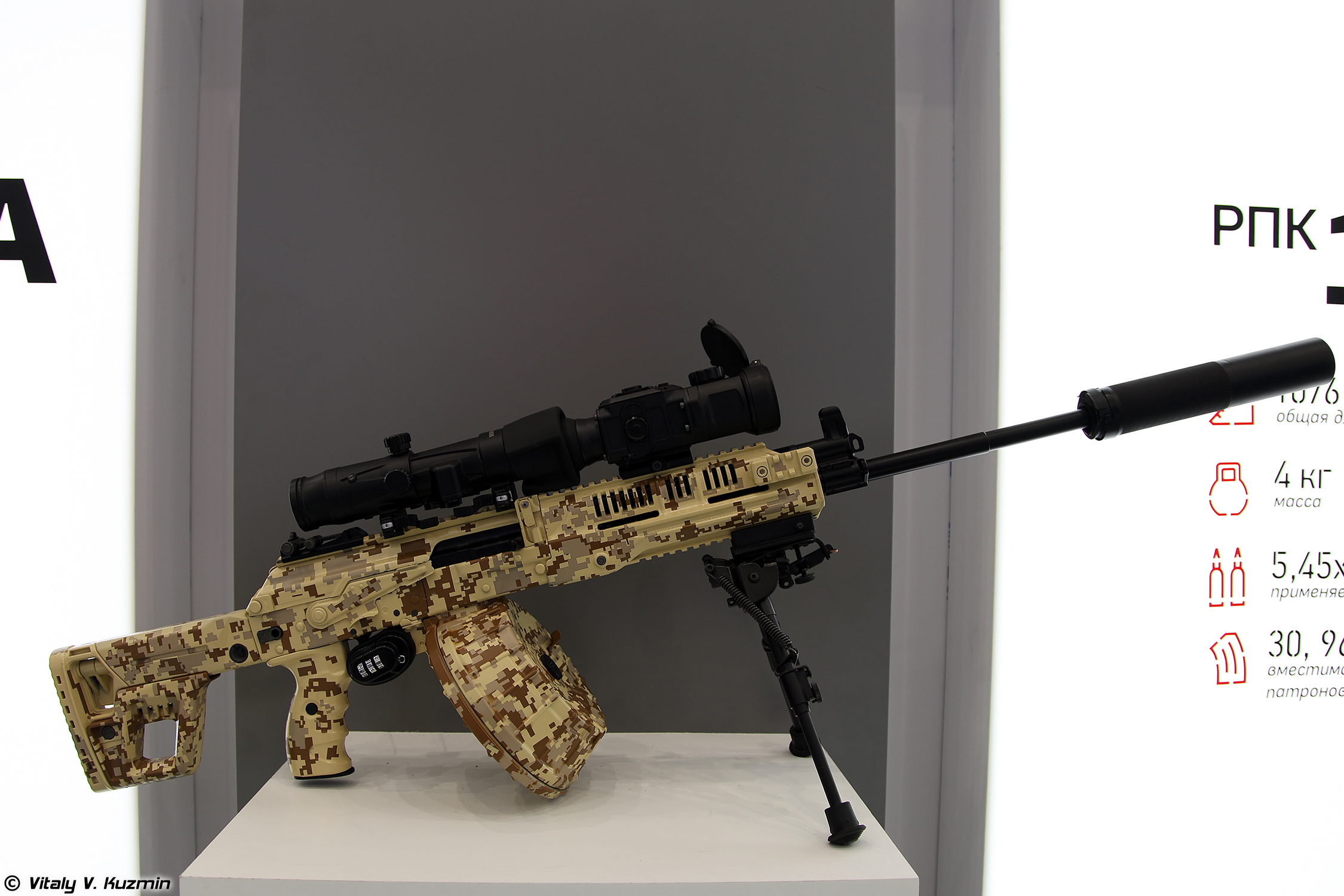
RPK-16 with a 550 mm (21.7 in) barrel and sound suppressor

The RPK-16 (the number 16 indicates the year 2016, when the development first started) is Kalashnikov's response to the "Tokar-2" program, where it competed against Degtyaryov's submission. In 2018, the Ministry of Defence of the Russian Federation have signed a contract concerning the procurement of the RPK-16, and is expected to take over the role of the RPK-74 in the Russian Armed Forces.

The RPK-16 is based on the RPK-400 prototype, which shares similar design features with the AK-12 production model. It is chambered in 5.45×39mm and features the traditional Kalashnikov gas-operated long-stroke piston system, and shares several novel technical and ergonomic features derived from the AK-12 program. Picatinny rails on the top of the receiver and bottom of the handguard are used for mounting various optical sights and detachable bipods. Because of this, the fixed bipod of the RPK-74 is not needed. Other features of the RPK-16 include an ergonomic pistol grip, a folding buttstock, and two main barrel lengths: a 550 mm (21.7 in) long barrel (when it is applied or configured for the light machine gun role) and a 370 mm (14.6 in) short barrel (when it is applied or configured for the assault rifle role). Its design enables it to have interchangeable barrels that can easily be removed, and the ability to quickly attach a detachable suppressor. It has a combat weight of 6 kg (13.23 lb), a full-length of 1,076 mm (42.4 in), a cyclic rate of fire of 700 rounds per minute, and an accuracy range of 800 m (870 yd). The RPK-16 primarily uses a newly developed 95-round drum magazine and is also backwards compatible with box magazines from the AK-12, AK-74 and RPK-74.

After receiving feedback on the performance of the RPK-16, Kalashnikov Concern began development on the RPL-20 (the number 20 indicating the year 2020) belt-fed light machine gun, chambered in 5.45×39mm cartridge. It features rate of fire of 800 rounds per minute, an empty weight of 5.5 kg (12.1 lb), an open-bolt design and quick-change barrels to enhance sustained fire. Kalashnikov Concern has so far created at least one functional prototype. The RPL-20 has become the first light machine gun to be used by Russian forces since the RPD machine gun that isn't magazine-fed or of the standard Kalashnikov pattern.

=== Foreign production ===
==== Bulgaria ====
The RPK is produced by Arsenal as the LMG in three different calibers, 7.62×39mm, 5.45×39mm and 5.56×45mm NATO.

The Arsenal LMGs are equipped with milled receivers. Their folding stock variants are known as the LMG-F.

==== East Germany ====
The RPK was produced locally in East Germany as the LMGK (German: Leichtes Maschinengewehr Kalashnikov, lit. 'Light Machine Gun Kalashnikov').

==== Iraq ====
The RPK is manufactured locally in Iraq as Al Quds.

==== North Korea ====
The RPK is manufactured locally in North Korea as the Type 64.

==== Romania ====
The RPK is manufactured locally in Romania by Fabrica de Arme Cugir SA as the Puşcă Mitralieră model 1964 (lit. 'Model 1964 light machine gun').

Later, a 5.45mm RPK-74 version based on the PA md. 86, the Mitralieră md. 1993 (lit. 'Model 1993 light machine gun'), was also developed.

==== Serbia ====
The Zastava M72 was based on the RPK, and developed from the Zastava M70.

== Users ==
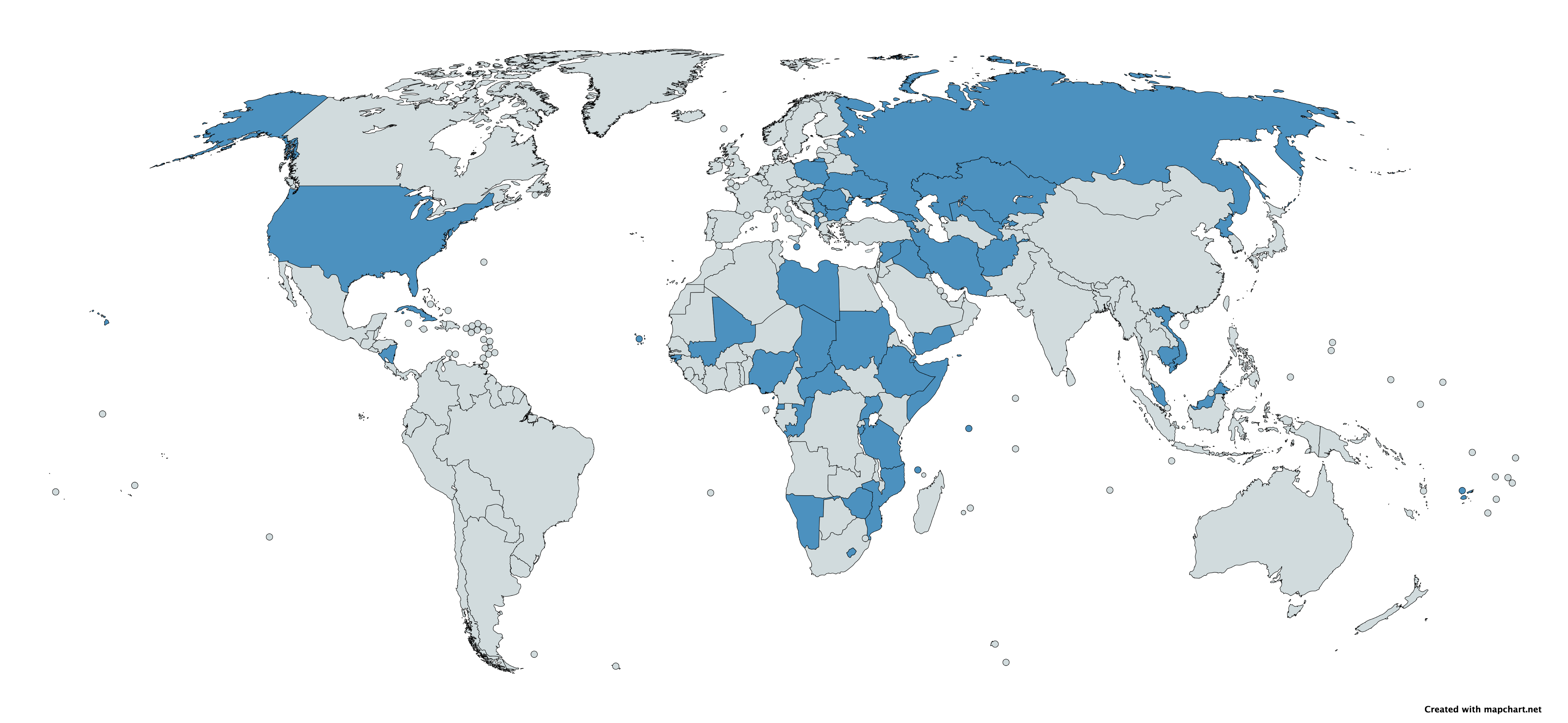
A map with RPK users in blue

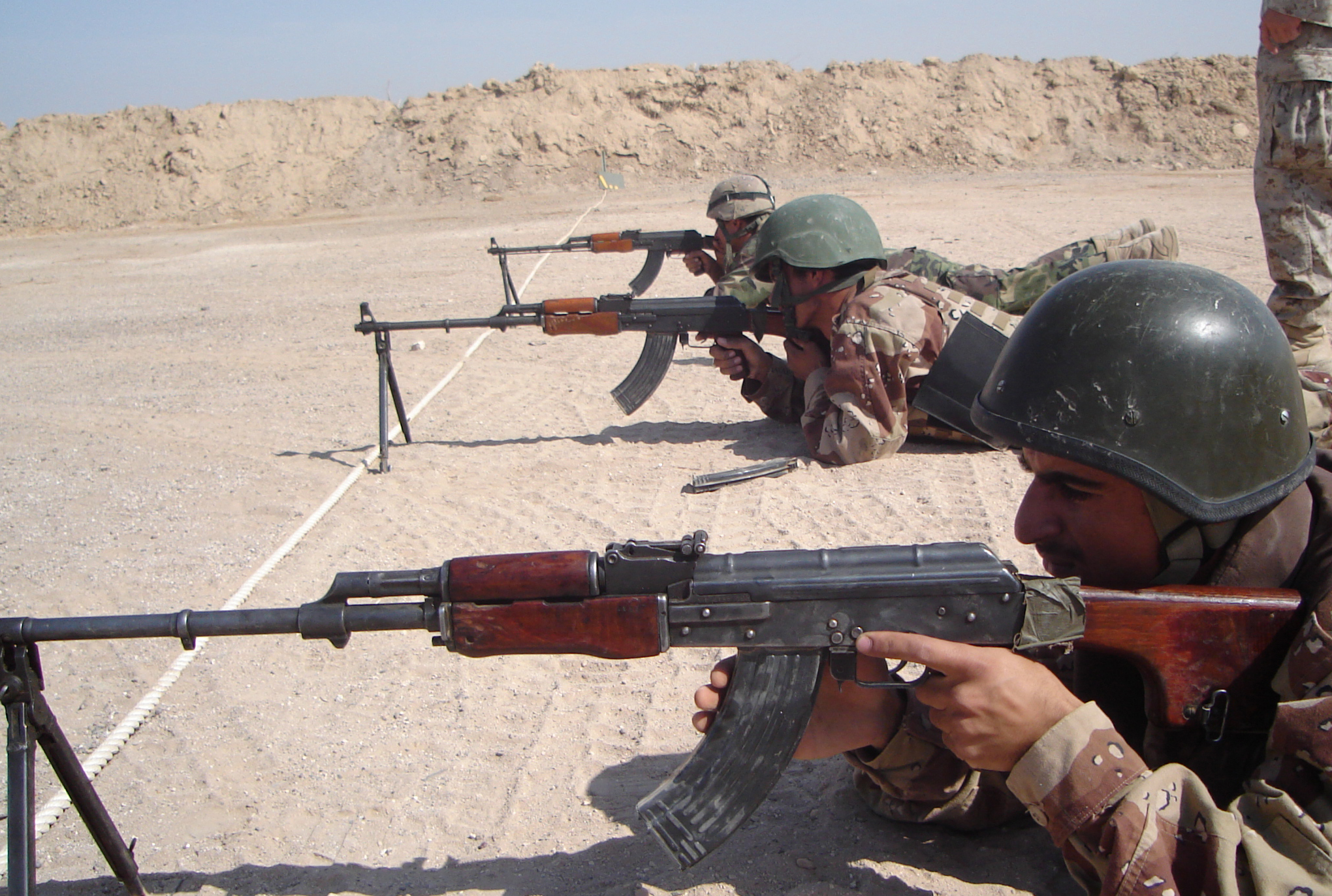
Iraqi soldiers training with the Romanian Model-1964 (RPK)

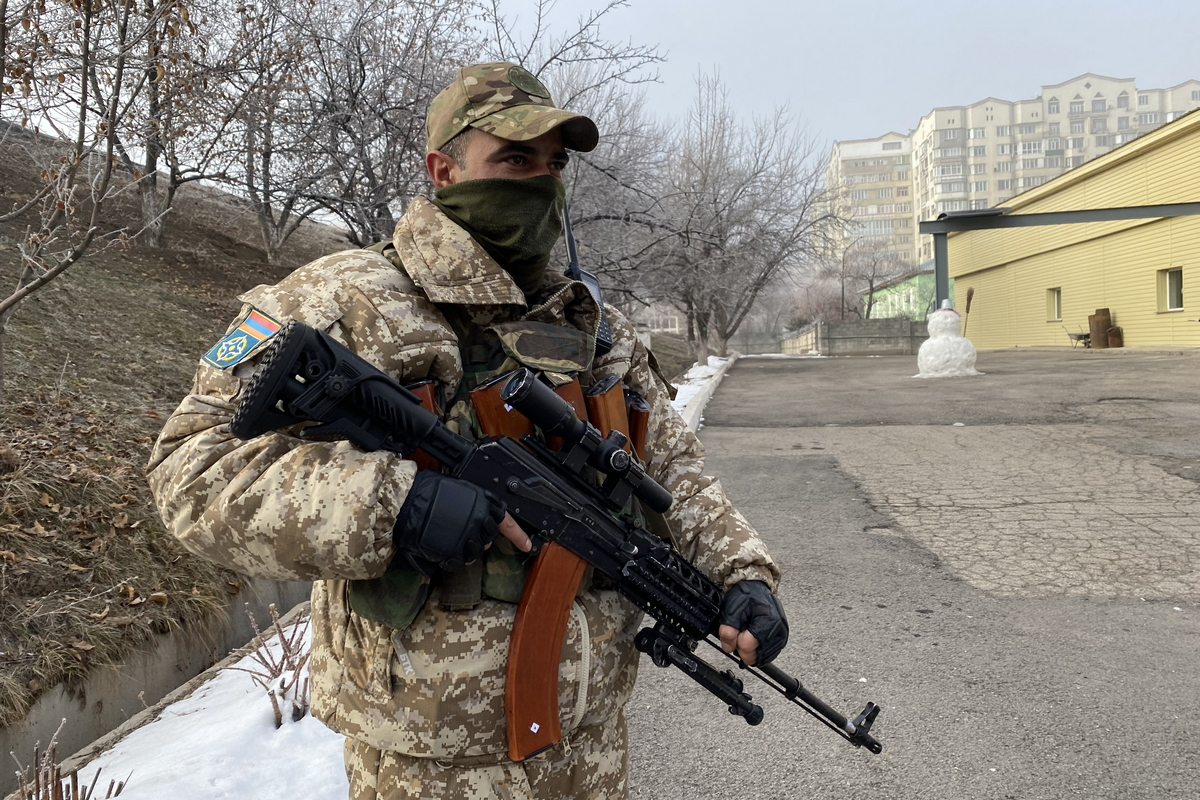
A soldier from the peacekeeping forces of the CSTO deployed in the Republic of Kazakhstan with a heavily modified RPK-74M

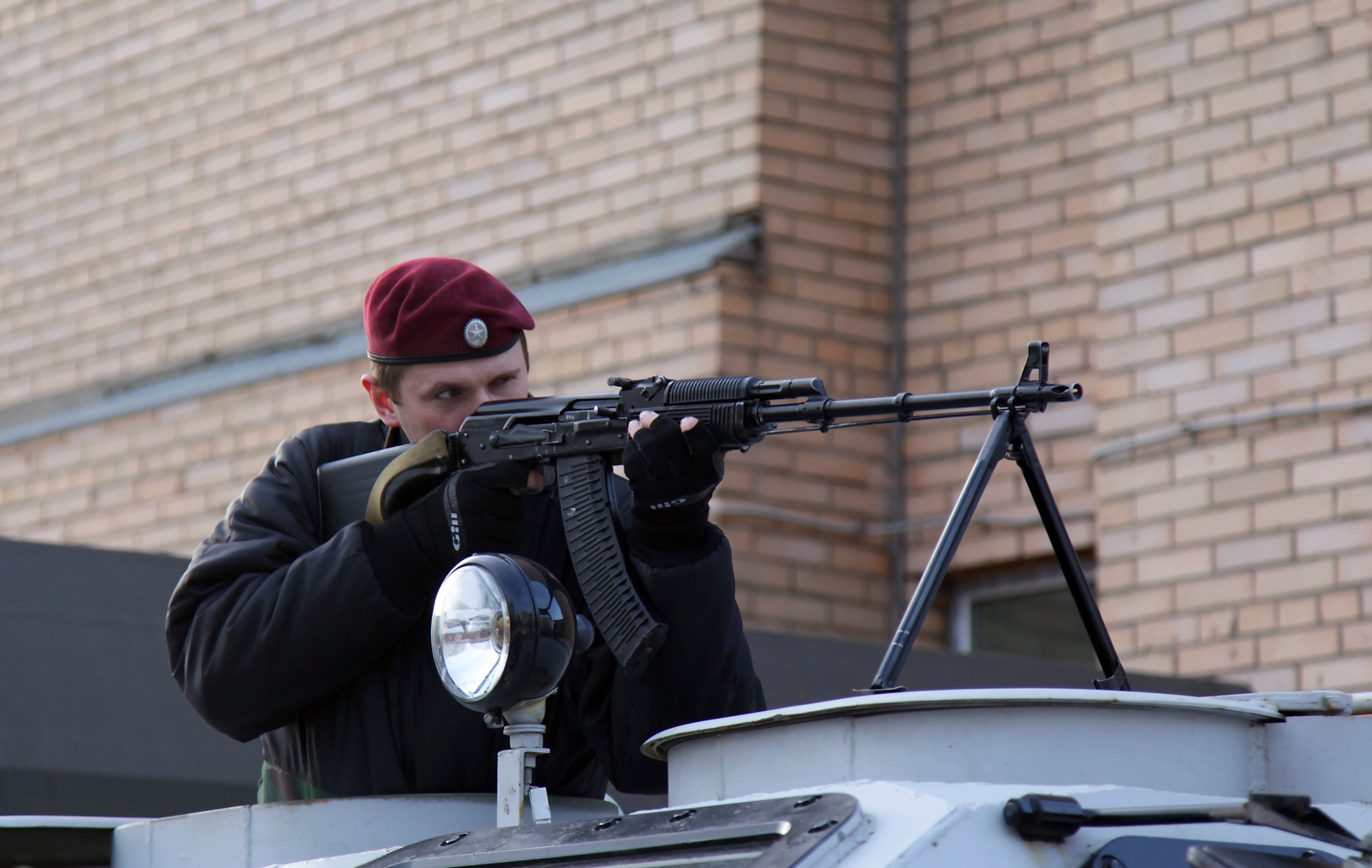
A Russian officer of the OSN Saturn with an RPK-74M

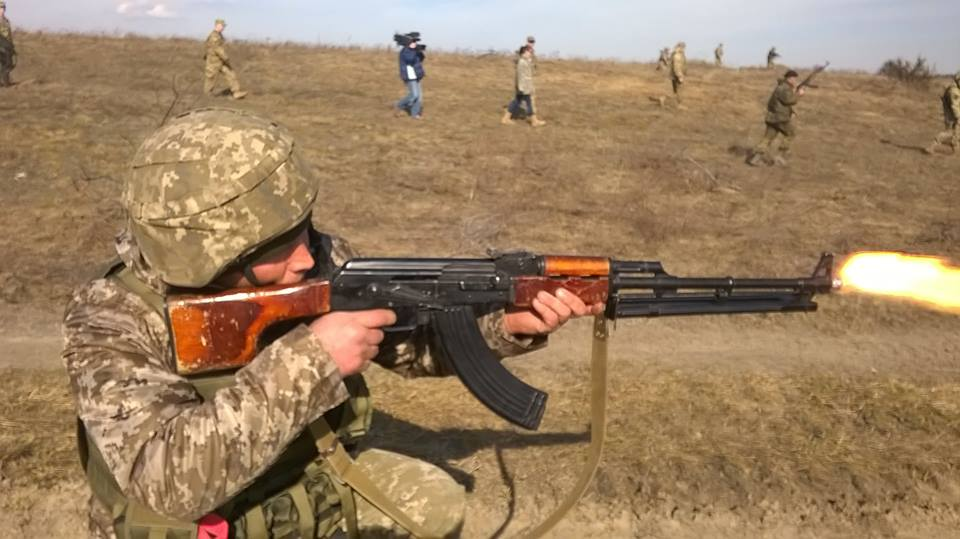
Ukrainian soldier firing the RPK during the JMTG-U exercise

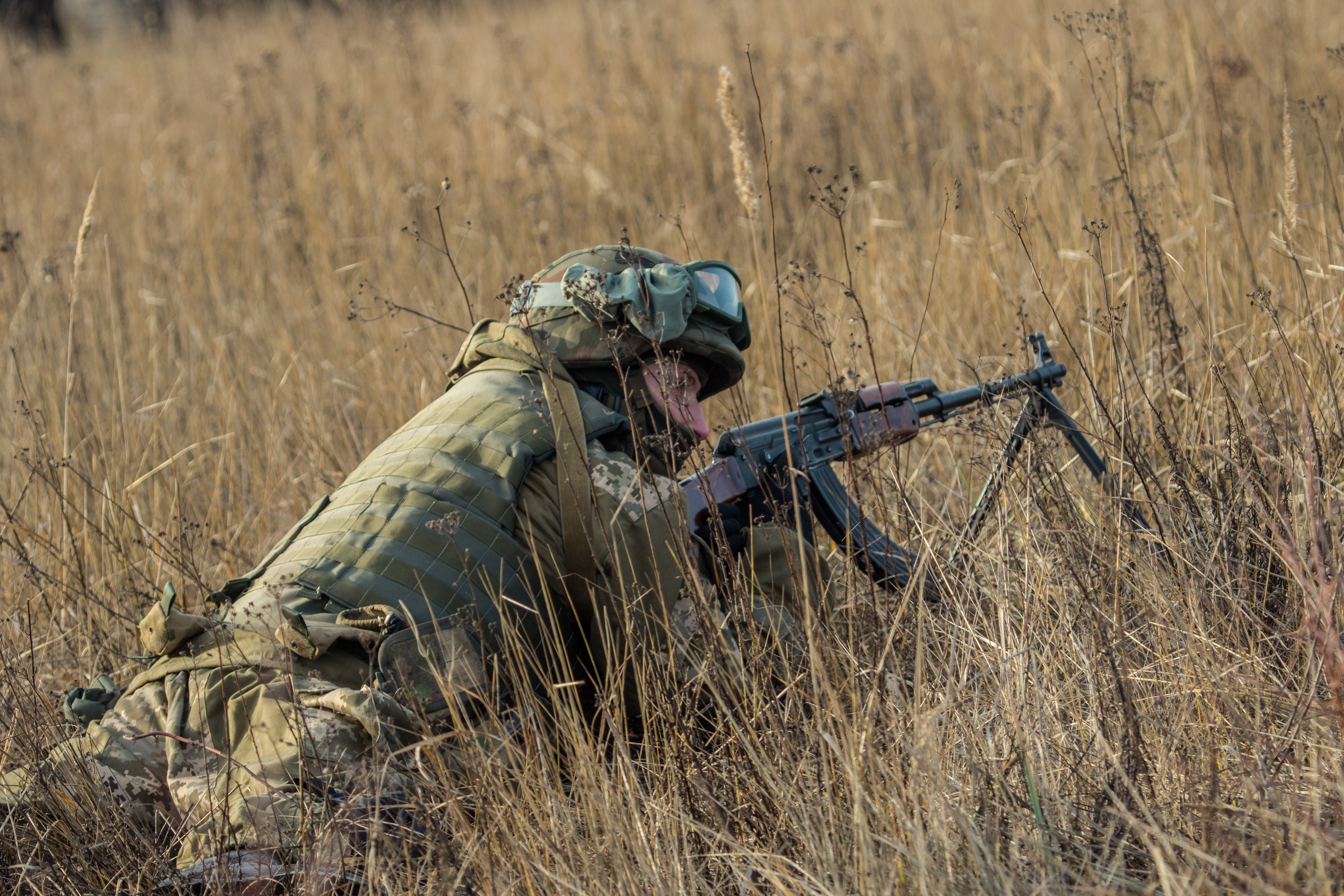
Soldier of National Guard of Ukraine with the RPK

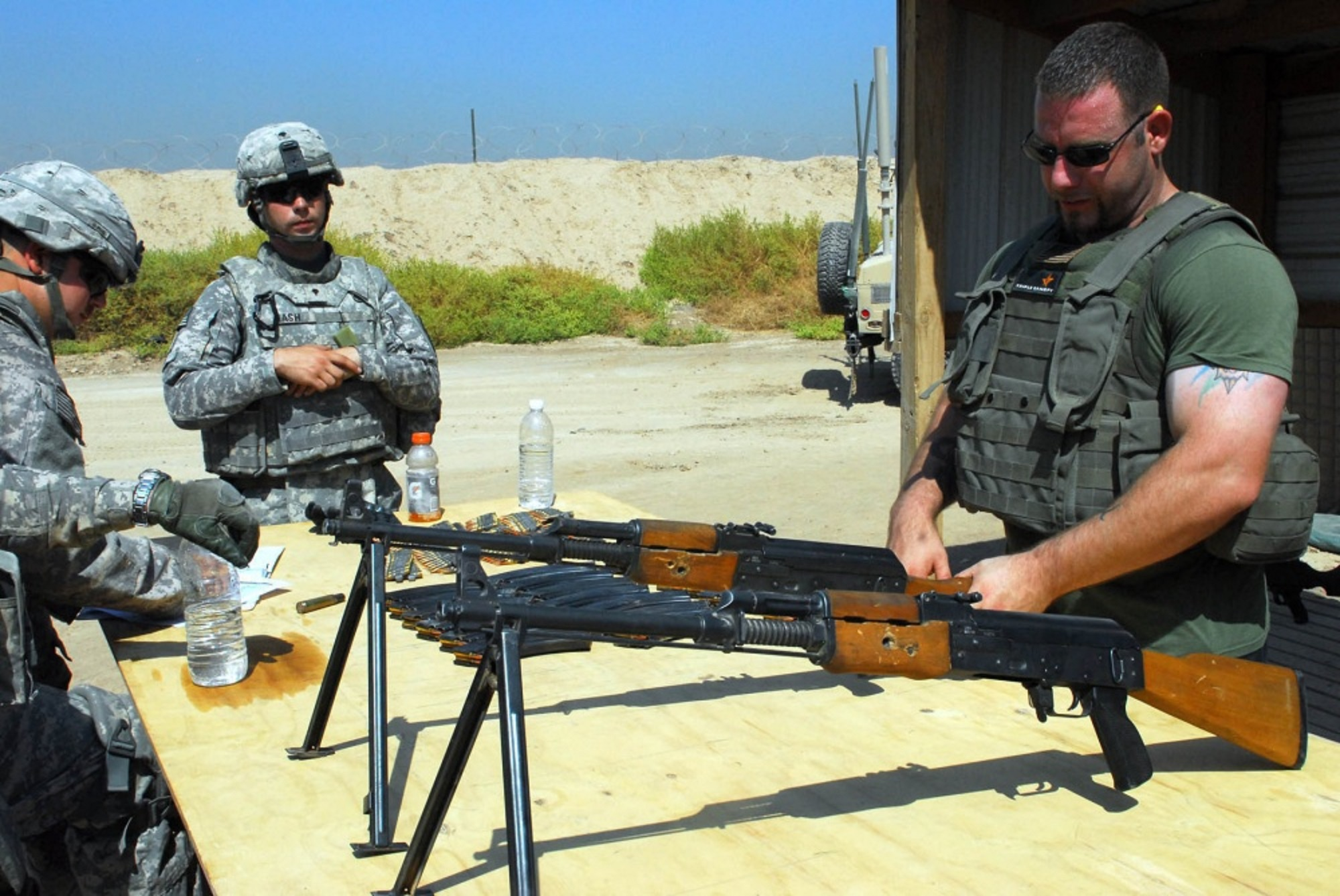
A Triple Canopy contractor gives a marksmanship class on the Zastava M72 to two U.S. Army soldiers

- Albania: Uses both Soviet RPKs and locally produced ASh-78 Tip-2s.
- Armenia: RPK-47.
- Bulgaria: Produced by Arsenal as the LMG in three different calibers, 7.62×39mm, 5.45×39mm and 5.56×45mm NATO. Uniquely had milled receivers. A folding stock variant is known as the LMG-F.
- Burundi
- Cambodia
- Cape Verde
- Central African Republic
- Chad
- Comoros
- Congo-Brazzaville
- Cuba
- Djibouti
- Equatorial Guinea
- Ethiopia
- Fiji: Russia donated RPK-201s amongst other military equipments.
- Georgia: RPK-74 variant is still in use by the Georgian Army and special forces.
- Guinea-Bissau
- Hungary
- Iran: Locally known as "BB-Kalash".
- Iraq Also manufactured locally as Al Quds.
- Kazakhstan: RPK-74.
- Latvia: Used by Latvian National Guard.
- Lesotho
- Libya
- Malaysia: RPK-74 variant is used by the Grup Gerak Khas (GGK) of the Malaysian Army.
- Mali: Armed and Security Forces of Mali.
- Malta
- Mozambique
- Namibia
- Nicaragua
- Nigeria
- North Korea: Type 64.
- Poland
- Romania: Built by Fabrica de Arme Cugir SA as the Puşcă Mitralieră model 1964 ("model 1964 light machine gun") and later, a 5.45mm version based on the PA md. 86—the Mitralieră md. 1993 ("model 1993 light machine gun").
- Russia: RPK, RPK-74, RPK-74M and RPK-16.
- Seychelles
- Serbia: Manufactured locally as the Zastava M72.
- Somalia
- Sudan
- Syria: Used by both pro-Assad and rebel groups.
- Tajikistan
- Tanzania
- Transnistria
- Uganda
- Ukraine: RPK-74 and RPK, also used by separatists.
- United States: Used during the Iraq War.
- Uzbekistan
- Vietnam
- Yemen
- Zimbabwe

=== Non-state users ===
- al-Qaeda
- Hamas
- Hay'at Tahrir al-Sham
- Hezbollah
- Houthis
- Islamic State
- Popular Mobilization Forces
- Syrian Democratic Forces
- (Afghanistan) Taliban

=== Former users ===
- Afghanistan
- Artsakh: RPK-203.
- Chechen Republic of Ichkeria - Used by Chechen forces during the First Chechen War
- East Germany: Manufactured locally as the LMGK (Leichtes Maschinengewehr Kalashnikov).
- Rhodesia
- Soviet Union
- Yugoslavia: Manufactured locally as the Zastava M72.

== Conflicts ==
=== 1950s ===
- Israeli–Palestinian conflict
- Vietnam War (1955–1975)

=== 1960s ===
- South African Border War (1966–1990)

=== 1970s ===
- Yom Kippur War (1973)
- Lebanese Civil War (1975–1990)
- Angolan Civil War (1975–2002)
- Afghan Wars (1978–present)
- Soviet–Afghan War (1979–1989)
- Salvadoran Civil War (1979–1992)

=== 1980s ===
- Iran–Iraq War (1980–1988)
- Somali Civil War (1980s–present)
- Lord's Resistance Army insurgency (1987–present)

=== 1990s ===
- Gulf War (1990–1991)
- Tuareg rebellion (1990–1995)
- Yugoslav Wars (1991–2001)
- Militias-Comando Vermelho conflict (1992–present)
- Burundian Civil War (1993–2005)
- First Chechen War (1994–1996)
- Second Chechen War (1999–2009)

=== 2000s ===
- Iraq War (2003–2011)
- Russo-Georgian War (2008)

=== 2010s ===
- Syrian civil war (2011–2024)
- War in Iraq (2013–2017)
- Libyan civil war (2014–2020)
- War in Donbas (2014–2022)
- Russo-Ukrainian War (2014–present)
- Ethiopian civil conflict (2018–present)

=== 2020s ===
- 2020 Nagorno-Karabakh conflict

== See also ==
- ČZW-762
- FN Minimi
- IP-2
- IWI Negev
- M249 Squad Automatic Weapon
- Nikonov machine gun
- PK machine gun
- PKP Pecheneg machine gun
- RPL-20
- Valmet M78
- Zastava M72

== Bibliography ==
- Rottman, Gordon (2011). The AK-47: Kalashnikov-series Assault Rifles. Osprey Publishing.
