= RPL-20 =

- RPL-20 light machine gun at the ISF 2026 forum
- Type: Light machine gun
- Place of origin: Russia

Service history
- In service: 2025-present

Production history
- Designer: Kalashnikov Concern
- Designed: August 2020 (prototype unveiled)
- Produced: 2025
- Variants: See Variants

Specifications
- Mass: 5.2–5.5 kg (11–12 lb)
- Length: 1,085–1,145 mm (42.7–45.1 in)
- Barrel length: 590 mm (23.2 in); 415 mm (16.3 in)
- Cartridge: 5.45×39mm 7.62×39mm (RPL-7)
- Action: Gas operated, rotating bolt, open bolt
- Rate of fire: 800 rounds/min
- Feed system: 100-, 200-round pouch of non-disintegrating belt

The RPL-20 (Russian: Ручной Пулемёт Ленточный 20, РПЛ-20, romanized: Ruchnoy Pulemot Lentochnyy 20, RPL-20, lit. 'Belt-fed Machine Gun 20, RPL-20') is a light machine gun developed by Kalashnikov Concern for the Russian military. The "20" in the designation indicates the year 2020.

== History ==
The Soviet military have not fielded a squad-level, intermediate caliber, belt-fed machine gun since the retirement of the RPD machine gun in the early 1960s.

Since the rejection of the PU-21 (IP-2) project and adoption of the PKM, the Russian military has not indicated any desire for a belt-fed, intermediate caliber machine gun.

The MVD solicited designs for a similar machine gun in the beginning of 2011, for use by counter-terror teams, though it did not follow through with any actual orders.

There have, however, been competitions to replace the RPK-74, leading to the selection of the RPK-16 for field trials.

Kalashnikov Concern has provided video of the RPL-20 being handled and fired, demonstrating that they have at least completed a fully-functioning prototype RPL-20.

Based on feedback from these field trials, Kalashnikov Concern independently began development of the RPL-20.

The RPL-20 was unveiled at the Army-2020 event in late August, 2020.

If adopted, the RPL-20 will become the first light machine gun to be used by Russian forces since the RPD machine gun that isn't magazine-fed or of the standard Kalashnikov pattern.

=== Adoption ===
The RPL-20 is anticipated to serve as a squad automatic weapon in Russian military use, supplementing the heavier-caliber PK machine guns currently used for suppressive fire while still providing a higher practical rate of fire than the RPK series.

As of January 2024, Kalashnikov Concern completed preliminary tests of the RPL-20 machine gun, and Ministry of Defense of the Russian Federation plans to conduct state trials of the machine gun in 2024.

The first serial batch was produced in May 2025 and shipped to the Russian military the following month. The RPL-20 was ordered in MultiCam camouflage pattern.

== Design details ==
The RPL-20 is a belt-fed, open bolt, fully automatic light machine gun with a rotating bolt and a long-stroke gas piston. Kalashnikov Concern has stated that the RPL-20 is a new design, rather than being a derivative of the ubiquitous Kalashnikov-pattern rifle series.

With an empty weight of 5.2-5.5 kg, the RPL-20 rivals the weight of an RPK-74 while providing belt-fed, open-bolt operation and quick-change barrels to enhance sustained fire.

The RPL-20 uses a non-disintegrating linked belt similar to the RPD machine gun. Alternative designs experimented with a dual-feed option (i.e., capable of both magazine- and belt-feed), considered to be an improvement over the RPK-74.

The choice to keep it belt-fed only was made to lighten the machine gun and make it less complex than a dual-feed model, allowing the troops in the field to top off spent belts as a trade-off for not accepting standard-issue assault rifle magazines.

The RPL-20 is designed with two barrel length options: 590 mm (23.2 in) for regular troops and 415 mm (16.3 in) for assault units.

== Variants ==
=== RPL-7 ===
The RPL-7 is a 7.62×39mm variant of the RPL-20. It features 415 mm (16.3 in) and 590 mm (23.2 in) barrel lengths, and uses a soft ammunition box that holds 80-rounds through a non-disintegrating belt.

== Users ==
- Russia

== Gallery ==
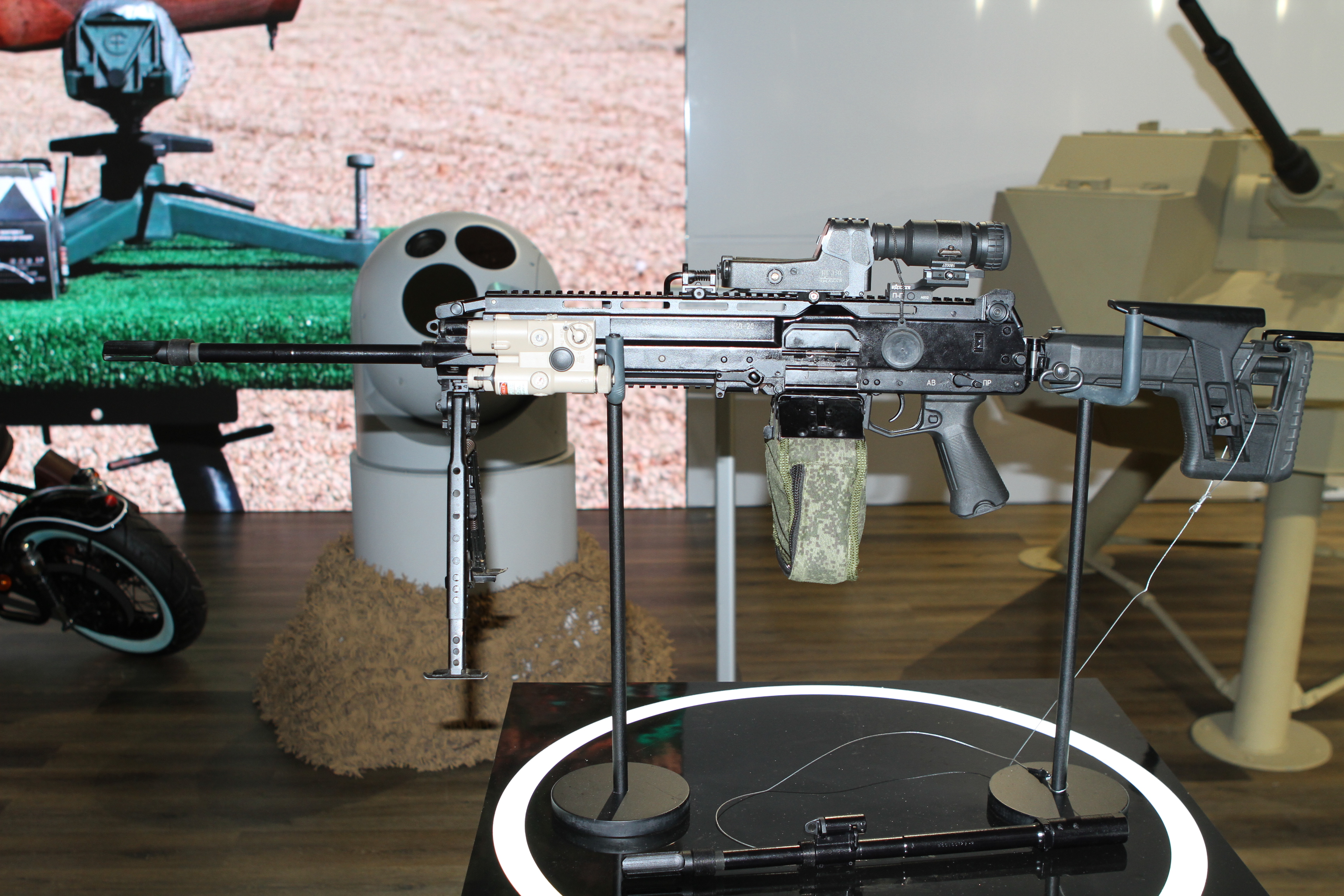
RPL-20 at Army-2020 forum

RPL-20 at ISF 2026 forum

RPL-20 at ISF 2026 forum

== See also ==
- FN EVOLYS
- FN Minimi
- IWI Negev
- PKP Pecheneg
- RPK-16
