= List of dual-feed firearms =

Dual-feed has been used to describe firearms which either can switch between two different feeding mechanisms or employ a feeding mechanism two times simultaneously.

== Firearms feeding from ammunition belt or box magazine ==
Name	Manufacturer	Image	Cartridge	Country	Year
Ares Shrike 5.56	Ares Defense		5.56×45mm	United States	2002
Daewoo Precision Industries K3	Daewoo Precision Industries		5.56×45mm	South Korea	1991
FN Minimi	FN Herstal		5.56×45mm	Belgium	1980
Standschütze Hellriegel M1915				Austro-Hungarian Empire	1915
IP-2	TsNIIMash		5.45×39mm	Soviet Union	1977
IWI Negev	Israel Weapon Industries		5.56×45mm	Israel	1997
M249 light machine gun	FN Herstal		5.56×45mm	United States	1984
MCR-5.56-DF	FIGHTLITE INDUSTRIES		5.56×45mm	United States	
QJS-161	Norinco		5.8×42mm	China	
Heckler & Koch HK21	Heckler & Koch		7.62×51mm	Germany	1961
TKB-516M			7.62×39mm	Soviet Union	1955
KORD-5.45			5.45×39mm	Russia	
Type 73 light machine gun	First Machine Industry Bureau		7.62×54mmR	North Korea	1970s
vz. 52 machine gun	Zbrojovka Brno		7.62×39mm 7.62×45mm	Czechoslovak Socialist Republic	1950s

== Simultaneous dual-feed ==
Name	Manufacturer	Image	Cartridge	Feed	Country	Year
Burton Machine Rifle			.345 Winchester Self-Loading	Detachable box magazine	United States	1917
AAI GPHMG "Dover Devil"	Army Armament Research and Development Command (ARRADCOM)		12.7×99mm 20mm caliber	ammunition belt	United States	1979
FN BRG-15	FN Herstal		15x115 mm	ammunition belt	Belgium	1983
IWI Tavor TS12	Israel Weapon Industries		12 gauge	Tubular magazine	Israel	2018
Kel-Tec KSG	Kel-Tec		12 gauge	Tubular magazine	United States	2011
NeoStead 2000	Truvelo Armoury		12 gauge	Tubular magazine	South Africa	2001
SRM Arms Model 1216	SRM Arms		12 gauge	Tubular magazine	United States	2011
STK 50MG	Chartered Industries of Singapore		12.7×99mm	ammunition belt	Singapore	1991
UTAS UTS-15	UTAS		12 gauge	Tubular magazine	Turkey	2012

== See also ==
- List of firearms
- List of assault rifles
- List of battle rifles
- List of bullpup firearms
- List of carbines
- List of machine guns
- List of multiple-barrel firearms
- List of semi-automatic rifles
- List of submachine guns
- List of shotguns
