= Zastava M72 =

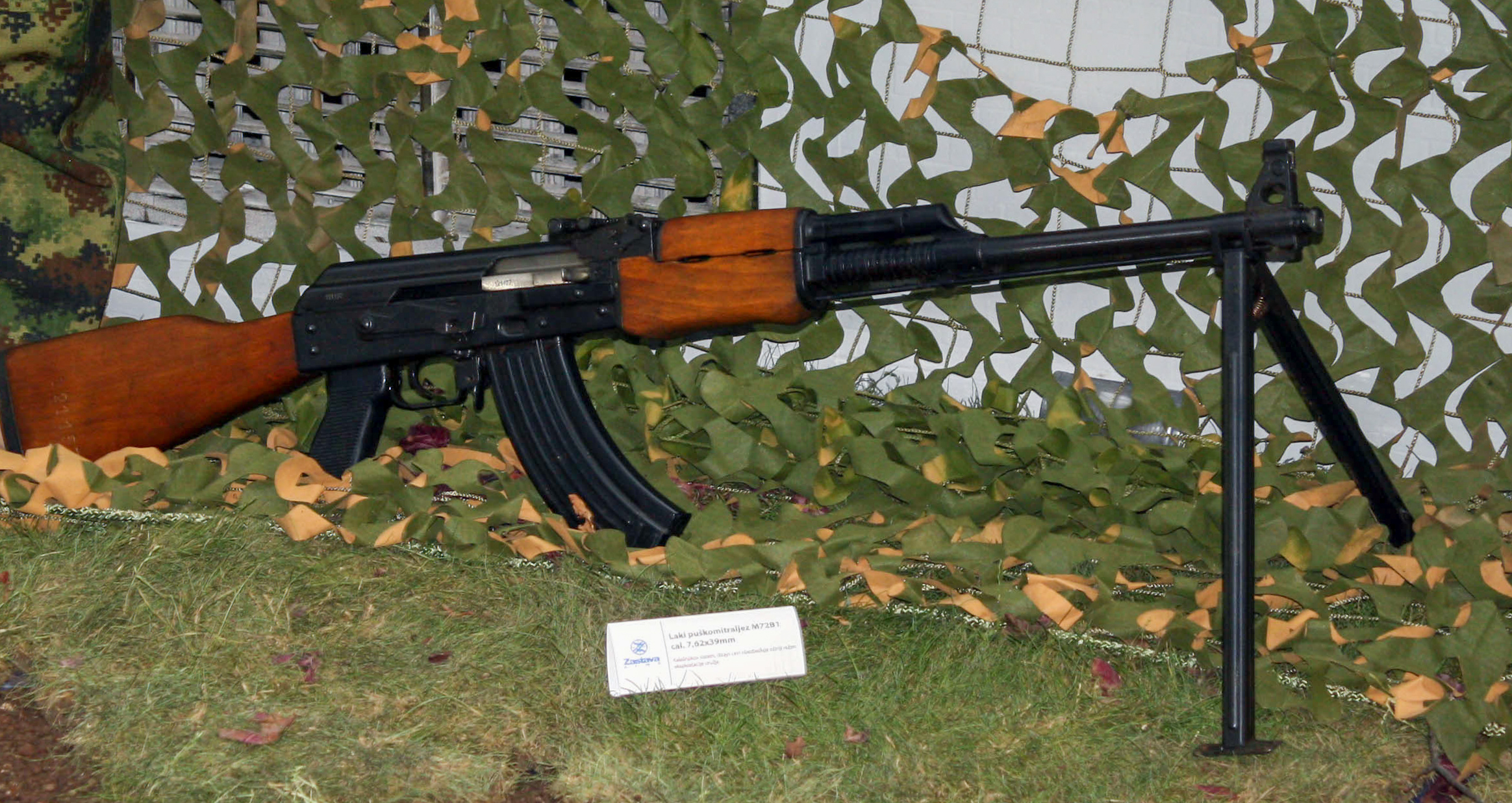
- Zastava M72
- Type: Light machine gun
- Place of origin: Yugoslavia

Service history
- In service: 1973–present
- Used by: See Users
- Wars: Salvadoran Civil War; Soviet–Afghan War; Iran–Iraq War; Nagorno-Karabakh conflict Yugoslav Wars; Iraq War; Operation Enduring Freedom; Syrian Civil War; OLA insurgency

Production history
- Designed: 1972
- Manufacturer: Zastava Arms
- Produced: since 1973

Specifications
- Mass: 5.5 kg (12.1 lb)
- Length: 1,025 mm (40.4 in)
- Barrel length: 542 mm (21.3 in)
- Cartridge: 7.62×39mm
- Action: Gas-actuated (rotating bolt)
- Rate of fire: 620 RPM
- Muzzle velocity: 745 m/s
- Effective firing range: 400 m
- Feed system: 30, 40 round box magazines or 75 round drum magazine
- Sights: Adjustable iron sights, optional mount required for optical sights

The Zastava M72 is a light machine gun developed and manufactured by Zastava Arms. The M72 was patterned after the Soviet RPK light machine gun.

== Design ==
The Zastava M72 chambers and fires the 7.62×39mm round. It is a gas-operated, air-cooled, drum-fed firearm with a fixed stock. It is a squad automatic weapon, like the Soviet RPK but has unique design features.

This weapon is a near copy of the Soviet RPK light machine gun. There are a few differences on the M72/M72A. It does not have a scope side rail mount, the butt is also different, having the shape of a regular AK-47 rifle. It has a reinforced receiver, night sights and no carrying handle. The barrel also differs from other RPK rifles because of the cooling fins to help with heat dissipation from prolonged fire. The M72 only appears with a heavy profile barrel as opposed to Russian and Romanian RPK rifles that can come in both light or heavy barrel configurations.

== Variants ==
- M72 - Standard version with a fixed wooden stock. Utilizes a milled receiver.
- M72B1 - Same as the M72, but with an updated stamped receiver instead of the milled receiver. A semi automatic variant is produced in the United States using original parts kits with a US made receiver and barrel.
- M72AB1 - Same as the M72B1, but with a folding stock and detachable bipod.
- Al Quds - Iraqi Licensed produced variant.

== Users ==
- Afghanistan
- Egypt
- Iraq — was manufactured locally as Al Quds
- Serbia

=== Non-state users ===
- Oromo Liberation Army
- Taliban – used during the War in Afghanistan (2001-2021)
