= FN BRG-15 =

15mm FN BRG-15 heavy machine gun
- Type: Heavy machine gun
- Place of origin: Belgium

Production history
- Designed: 1980s
- Manufacturer: Fabrique Nationale Herstal SA

Specifications
- Length: 2,000 mm (79 in)
- Barrel length: 1,500 mm (59.1 in)
- Cartridge: 15×115 mm
- Caliber: 15 mm
- Action: Gas
- Rate of fire: 700 rounds/min
- Muzzle velocity: 1,055 m/s (3,461 ft/s)
- Effective firing range: 2000 m
- Feed system: Dual; disintegrating link belts

The FN BRG-15 was a heavy machine gun designed by Fabrique Nationale de Herstal as a potential replacement for the Browning M2HB .50 caliber machine gun.

== History ==
It was announced in October 1983 that FN was seeking to develop a more powerful replacement for the .50 BMG, better able to penetrate light armoured vehicles (in effect, a Western equivalent to the Soviet 14.5mm KPV heavy machine gun). FN initially selected the 20mm Hispano case as a basis and necked it down to 15mm for the FN-BRG (15×115). The weapon and its ammunition had a protracted development and finally emerged as a 15.5mm because of fast barrel wear.

The 15.5×106 was FN's second effort to make a KPV competitor in the BRG-15, appropriately by necking out the KPV's case. It also utilized an unusual dual feed device, with link ammunition belts feeding from both the right and left. Spent shell casings were ejected out of the bottom of the gun, as in FN's later P90 personal defense weapon. The quick-change barrel assembly developed for the BRG-15 was redesigned for use in an updated version of the M2HB.

The project was cancelled in the early 1990s, as FN shifted its focus to the P90 personal defense weapon.

The subcaliber bullet fired from an FN BRG-15 15.5mm round had a muzzle energy of 40,000 J (more than double that of the M2HB at 18,000 J of bullet energy at the muzzle).

== See also ==
- List of dual-feed firearms
