= PU-21 =

Soviet machine gun

PU-21 / ПУ-21 (Пулемёт с унифицированной подачей)
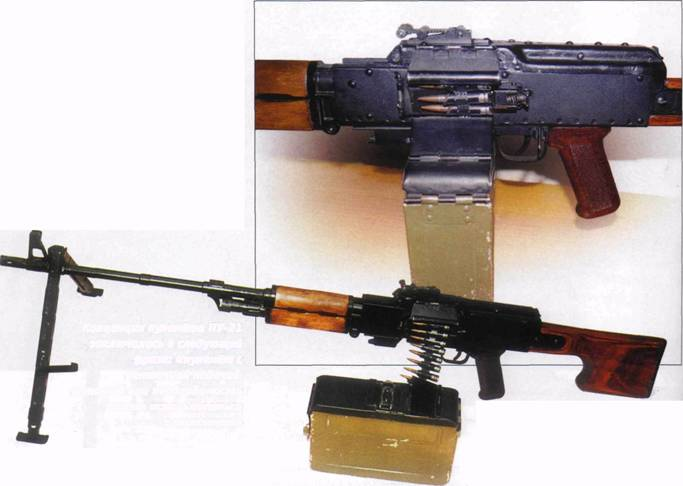
- Type: Light machine gun
- Place of origin: Soviet Union

Production history
- Designer: Yu.K. Aleksandrov; M.E. Dragunov; V.M. Kalashnikov
- Manufacturer: TsNIITochMash

Specifications
- Mass: 5.7 kg
- Length: 1060 mm (41.73 in)
- Barrel length: 590 mm (23.2 in)
- Cartridge: 5.45×39mm
- Caliber: 5.45 mm
- Action: Gas-operated
- Rate of fire: 750 rpm
- Muzzle velocity: 960 m/s (3150 ft/s)
- Effective firing range: 1000 m (1094 yds)
- Feed system: 20- or 45-round box magazine 200-round belt
- Sights: Iron

The PU-21 (Russian: ПУ-21 Пулемёт с унифицированной подачей) is a 5.45×39mm machine gun designed by V. M. Kalashnikov and M. E. Dragunov between 1972 and 1977.

== History ==
Russian (at the time Soviet) military forces have not fielded a squad-level, intermediate caliber, belt-fed machine gun since the retirement of the RPD in the early 1960s.

Official Soviet doctrine from the 1960s onward dictated that squad-level suppressive fire would be provided by the RPK, while PK machine guns would be issued at the company level to provide heavier fire.

The Soviet military moved from the 7.62×39 mm round to the 5.45×39 mm cartridge for its rifles and light machine guns.

Therefore, it considered adopting a dual-feed light machine gun in the new caliber to replace the RPK, similar to the FN Minimi in Western armies.

This resulted in the development of the PU-21 light machine gun.

== Design ==
The PU-21 can be fed from either a 45-round magazine or a 200-round belt. Its sights are graduated to distance of 1,000 metres (3,300 ft).

== Aftermath ==
The PU-21 prototypes were thoroughly tested by the Soviet Army in Leningrad, but military experts did not see convincing arguments for replacing the RPK and RPK-74 with the PU-21 design.

According to the Soviet military, the design was too complex compared to other weapons then in service, and failed to enhance combat effectiveness.

The PKM machine gun, the modernised PK variant, was adopted instead.

== See also ==
- List of machine guns
- List of dual-feed firearms
- Ares Shrike 5.56
- RPK-74
- RPL-20, a similarly belted 5.45 machine gun, drew some inspiration from this project
- PKM
- FN Minimi
- QJY-88
- List of Russian weaponry
