= Firearm modification =

Enhancement of a firearm's aspects

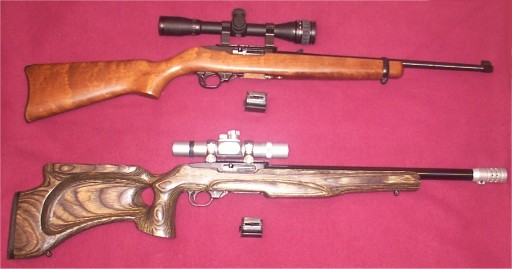
Standard Ruger 10/22 Carbine on top, and a highly modified version below, all done by the owner with drop-in parts

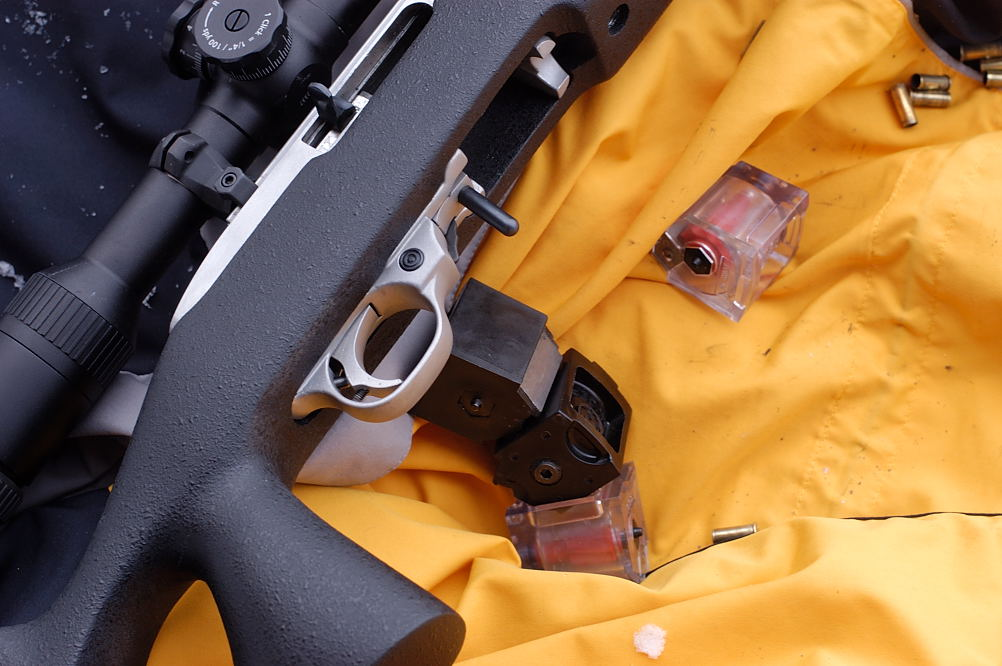
A gunsmith customized Ruger 10/22 by Clark Custom Guns.

Firearm modification is commonly done in order to enhance various aspects of the performance of a firearm. Reasons for these modifications can range from cosmetic to functional, and can be simple operations that the owner can perform, or complex operations requiring the services of a gunsmith.

== Modifications performed ==
Common modifications include:

- Cosmetic and ergonomic modifications
  - Replacement or alteration of grips or stocks
  - Changing of sights, such as the adjustable iron sights or a telescopic sight
  - Adding or removing weight to ease carrying, alter balance, or help moderate recoil
  - Metal engraving or custom woodwork
  - Checkering or stippling wood or metal
  - Altering the metal finish, using techniques such as bluing, electroplating, or parkerizing
  - Use of a shorter barrel to reduce size and weight, or a longer barrel to increase velocity
- Caliber conversions
  - Rechambering or rebarreling for a new caliber, such as conversions made to chamber a wildcat cartridge
  - Use of a caliber conversion sleeve or other readily removable insert to fire a smaller, less expensive cartridge
- Operating mechanism conversions
  - Muzzleloading or paper cartridge to metallic cartridge conversions, such as the Allin conversion or Lund conversion
  - Conversion from fully automatic or select fire to semiautomatic only or manual operation, or vice versa
  - Short recoil to blowback conversions, used in various .22 Long Rifle conversions, such as the Colt Ace and J. A. Ceiner conversion kits.
  - Conversion from handgun to carbine or rifle
  - Addition of a rifled barrel to a shotgun to allow it to better fire shotgun slugs
- Accurizing
- Sporterizing

Some commonly customized firearms include the Ruger 10/22 carbine, the M1911 pistol, and the AR-15 rifle, all of which have large numbers of aftermarket parts suppliers. Shooting disciplines such as bullseye pistol and benchrest shooting also rely extensively on custom-built and modified firearms to achieve top accuracy.

== Legal issues ==
Care must be taken when modifying firearms, as some operations may convert a legal firearm into an illegal one. An example of this is the restrictions in the US National Firearms Act, which define restricted classes of firearms. Examples of illegal firearms under this act are:

- Rifles with overall lengths under 26 inches, or barrels under 16 inches in length
- Shotguns with overall lengths under 26 inches, or barrels under 18 inches in length
- Machine guns
- A conversion to a fixed cartridge of over .50 caliber

These restrictions vary from location to location; some areas may restrict magazine capacity or require special safety devices such as loaded chamber indicators, integral locking mechanisms, magazine disconnects. Also commonly required are identifying marks such as serial numbers or firearm microstamping components, removal of which may be illegal Furthermore - conversion of semi-automatic weapons into select-fire weapons has been illegal for non-SOT holding gunsmiths since the passage of the Hughes Amendment in 1986. Such weapons may be held only by law enforcement and military only except for "dealer samples" left in the hands of SOT holders. Fully automatic weapons converted to semi-automatic only operation are machine guns per the NFA. The BATFE's policy is "Once a machine gun, always a machine gun."

== See also ==
- Pedersen rifle
- Rail integration system – system for attaching accessories to firearms
