= John S. Marr =

- Born: John S. Marr; New York City, US
- Education: Yale University; New York Medical College; Harvard School of Public Health
- Occupations: Medical doctor, author
- Writing career
- Language: English
- Genres: Action, adventure, science fiction, techno-thriller
- Website: www.johnsmarr.com

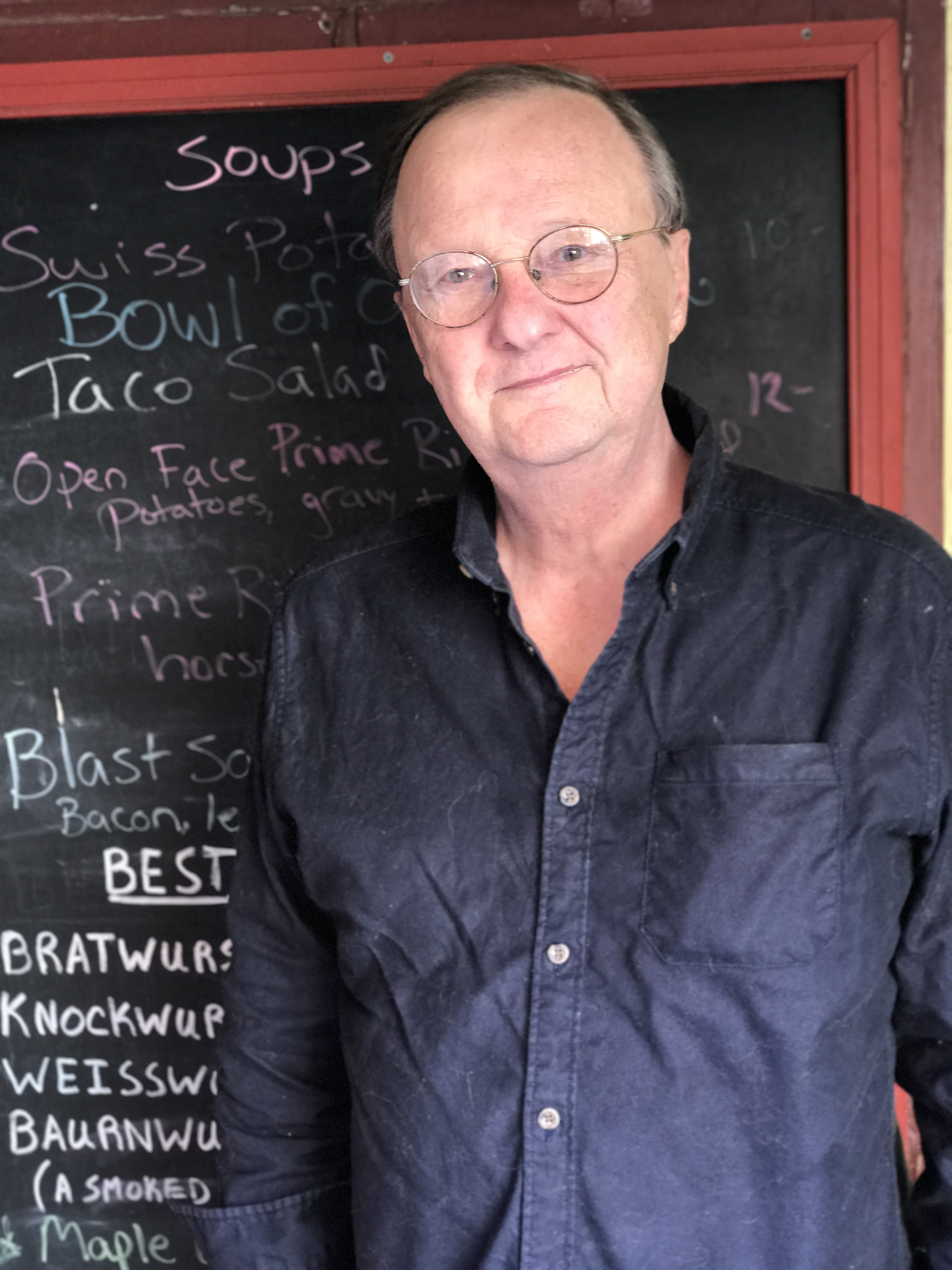
JSM in Charlottesville in October 2016.

John S. Marr (born April 1940) is an American physician, epidemiologist, and author. His professional life has concerned outbreaks of infectious disease and thus his subsequent writing career has focused on that topic, particularly historical epidemics.

== Early life and education ==
Marr was born in New York City and grew up in Manhattan, attending Trinity School and Deerfield Academy. After graduating from Yale, he received an MD from New York Medical College and did a residency in Spanish Harlem. He then completed an MPH degree from the Harvard School of Public Health. Marr is a board-certified (internal medicine, preventive medicine, occupational medicine) physician and a Louisiana State University Fellow in Tropical Medicine.

== Medical career ==
After graduating, Major Marr served at the US Army's Academy of Health Sciences in San Antonio, Texas. His role was teaching about tropical disease to troops preparing to deploy to the Vietnam War. In 1966, he worked up-country in Liberia (in the same area as the 2014 Ebola outbreak) at Phebe Hospital, treating malaria, schistosomiasis, intestinal worms and leprosy.

In 1974, Marr returned to New York as the city's director of the New York City Bureau of Communicable Diseases, where he investigated a number of infectious disease outbreaks, including Legionnaires' disease, typhoid fever, botulism, amoebiasis, and was director of the city's swine flu response in 1976. He went on to hold several private and government medical posts. His last post was as State Epidemiologist of Virginia, from which he retired in 2006.

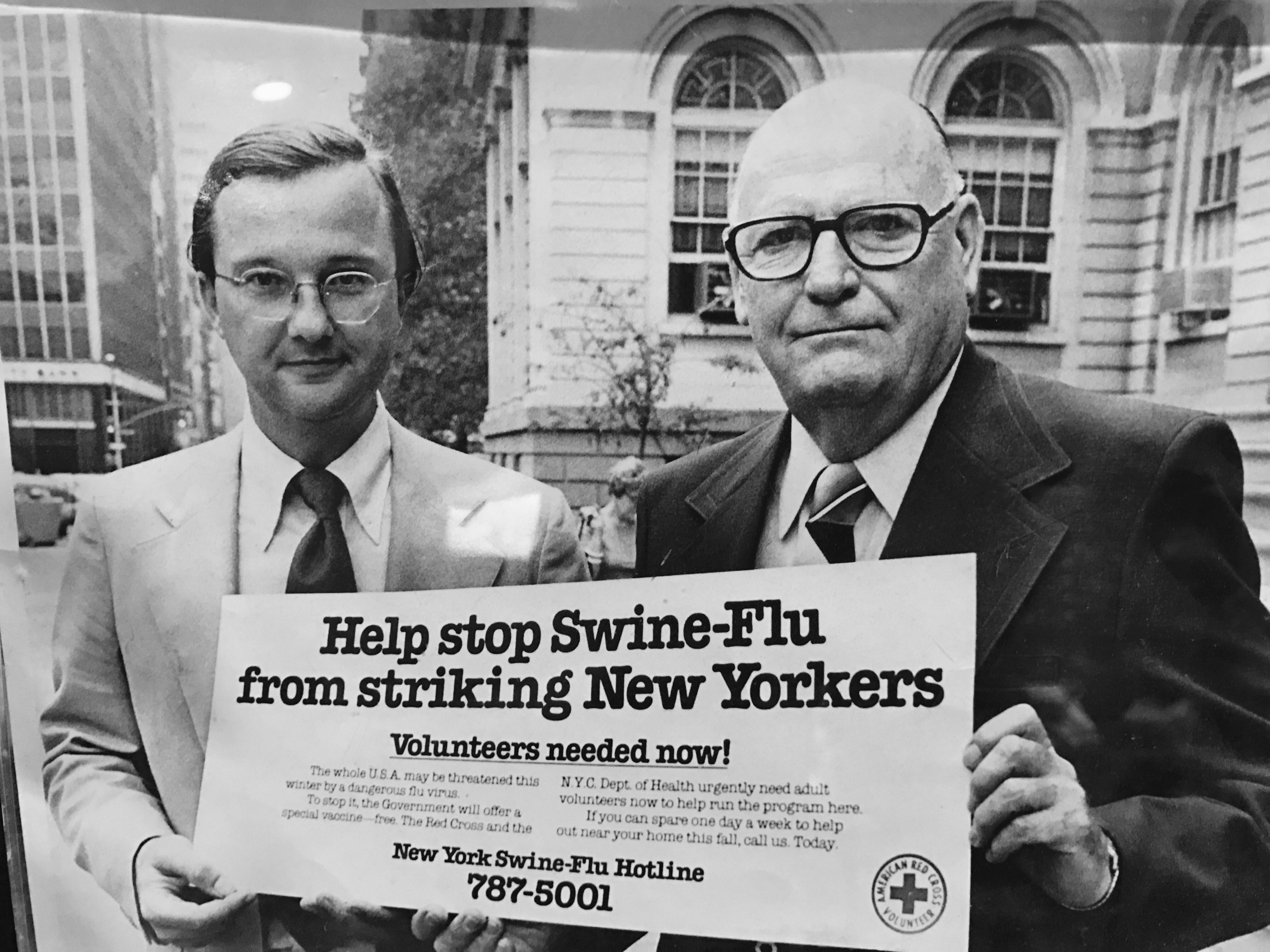
JSM with Director of NYC Red Cross, 1976

== Writing ==
Marr's writing career began in the early 1970s when he wrote three popular books for children on health issues (The Good Drug and the Bad Drug, A Breath of Air and a Breath of Smoke, and The Food You Eat). A New York Times article featured The Good Drug and the Bad Drug and a special teacher's guide was developed for city schools. The book was later featured in a 1971 NBC-TV special on drugs hosted by Bill Cosby, in which Marr appeared. Marr went on to co-author a thriller about a pneumonic plague outbreak in New York, inspired by research he'd done as the city's epidemiologist. Written with Gwyneth Cravens and published in 1978, The Black Death was later filmed by CBS as a movie of the week under the title Quiet Killer.

In 1996, Marr wrote a scientific paper speculating on the causes of the ten plagues of Egypt, which was then featured in a New York Times article on scientific explanations for the plagues. The article led to an hour-long 1998 BBC documentary. At the same time, he co-created the plaguescapes website, one of forty declared "best of the web" out of 65,000 websites by the Encyclopædia Britannica in 1998. An illustrated and updated adaptation of the article is now available on iBooks. His articles on historical epidemics have been made into documentary films by National Geographic, Warner Brothers Video, Discovery, and the Travel Channel. He was also a contributor to the Concrete Jungle, a 1997 book by artist Alexis Rockman.

Marr's second novel, The Eleventh Plague (1998), is a thriller in which a rogue scientist attempts to unleash modern versions of the Biblical plagues. A 2000 sequel, Wormwood, was a bestseller in Germany. In the sequel, the crazed scientist from The Eleventh Plague reappears and plots against delusional adversaries who he believes are reincarnated Wizard of Oz characters. Each enemy is stalked and killed by parasites designed for specific tasks to fulfill each character's weaknesses (lack of a heart, brain, and so on). The novels were inspired in part by the Vincent Price film The Abominable Dr. Phibes.

In 2001, Marr co-edited a series of articles on bioterrorism. It was published months before the anthrax scares and was used by health officials as a source of reliable information before the creation of the Department of Homeland Security informational websites. In 2005, he co-authored a comprehensive guide to parasites, which is widely used by medical students, military medics, physicians, veterinarians, and parasitologists in the US and abroad.

More recently, he has written a series of short novels for young adults that are available in Kindle books. Set in the early 1950s, the books involve boys investigating a series of mysteries, such as the disappearance of a former OSS agent, an ancient Native American curse, and a character linked to Unit 731. All are freestanding and take place in both a rural Pennsylvania setting and New York City.

Launched in July 2018, on a podcast series on JPHMPDirect, the online site for the Journal of Public Health Management & Practice, Marr relates stories about historical epidemiological investigations, such as "Mystery in the Pines," which recounts a typhoid epidemic in the Catskill Mountains. The collection of case studies called Backstories in Epidemiology: True Medical Mysteries is also available in ebook form. During the COVID-19 pandemic, Dr. Marr and Dr. Lloyd Novick, the editor-in-chief of JPHMP, discussed future scenarios as the situation unravelled.

Since his first scientific publication in 1967, he has authored or co-authored over fifty peer-reviewed articles on communicable disease topics. One of the first was an unusual report on the epidemiology of the human bite from 892 human bites reported to the New York City Department of Health in 1977. He has also written many articles, book reviews, essays on public health issues, and analyses of historical epidemics. In ""Was the huey cocoliztli a haemorrhagic fever?"" he and co-author Kiracofe proposed an alternative explanation for the post-Columbian epidemics in central Mexico that decimated the indigenous population during the 16th century. Based on a comprehensive study of newly found eyewitness accounts and other historical and scientific evidence, they concluded that the cause was an arenaviral disease that arose in part as a result of changes in post-contact agrarian practices. A 2018 paleogenomic analysis of ancient genetic material from skeletal remains suggested that a strain of Salmonella enterica, a cause of enteric fever, might be a cause, but the study was limited to detection of bacterial pathogens and DNA viruses, while arenaviruses are RNA viruses. His analysis of an epidemic of smallpox that struck an invading army that besieged Mecca suggested that the outbreak saved the pre-Islamic peoples, including a newborn Mohammed. For the American Public Health Association, he and a co-author published "A Century in the Life of the Control of Communicable Diseases Manual: 1917 to 2017." In 2017, he published a review of a large outbreak of hepatitis B among US troops in 1942 that was due to contaminated lots of yellow fever vaccine. He continues to research information on obscure historical infectious disease outbreaks.
