= Kalashnikov =

Kalashnikov may refer to:

== Weapons ==
- Mikhail Kalashnikov, Russian military engineer and small arms designer
- Kalashnikov rifle, a series of automatic rifles based on the original design of Mikhail Kalashnikov
  - AK-47
  - AK-74
- Kalashnikov Concern, Russian manufacturer of the rifles and other weapons
- Kalashnikov USA, Israeli owned United States manufacturer and distributor of Kalashnikov style rifles and other weapons

== Creative works ==
- The Song of the Merchant Kalashnikov, poem about Russian fist fighting by Mikhail Lermontov, written in 1837
  - The Merchant Kalashnikov, opera by Anton Rubinstein, based on Lermontov's poem
  - Song About the Merchant Kalashnikov (film), a 1909 Russian film by Vasily Goncharov, based on Lermontov's poem
- Kalasnjikov, a song from the soundtrack to Emir Kusturica's film Underground
- Kalashnikov, a 2020 Russian biographical film about Mikhail Kalashnikov.

== Other uses ==
- Kalashnikov (surname), including a list of people with the name
- Kalashnikov culture, a tradition of weapon ownership in Pakistan
- Kalashnikov Variation, a form of the Sicilian Defense in chess

== See also ==
- Kalashnik (disambiguation)
