= Goldfarb =

Goldfarb is a German surname meaning "golden color". Notable people with the surname include:

- Alex Goldfarb (politician), Israeli politician
- Alexander Goldfarb (biologist), microbiologist, activist and author
- Alvin Goldfarb, president of Western Illinois University
- Charles Goldfarb, co-inventor of the Generalized Markup Language, a system for annotating text
- Donald Goldfarb (born 1941), American mathematician
- Eddy Goldfarb, American toy inventor
- Ève Goldfarb-Borgese (born 1951), professionally known as Yeva, Israeli-French sculptor
- Howard Goldfarb, Canadian poker player
- Lawrence R. Goldfarb, CEO and founding partner of LRG Capital Group
- Mauricio Goldfarb (1947–2021), Argentine journalist better known as Mauro Viale
- Michael Goldfarb (author and journalist), American foreign correspondent, author and broadcaster
- Michael Goldfarb (political writer), American writer for The Weekly Standard
- Robert Goldfarb, President and CEO of Ruane, Cunniff, and Goldfarb
- Veniamin Iosifovich Goldfarb, Soviet scientist and academic
- Warren Goldfarb, philosopher and mathematician

== See also ==
- Broyden–Fletcher–Goldfarb–Shanno algorithm, a method for solving nonlinear optimization problems
- Goldfarb Seligman & Co., the largest law firm in Israel
- Ruane, Cunniff & Goldfarb, an investment firm in the United States
