= Kalashnikov (surname) =

Kalashnikov (Russian: Калашников) is a surname literally meaning, "son of Kalach maker". Notable people with the name include:

- Mikhail Kalashnikov (1919−2013), Russian small arms designer, designer of the AK-47 assault rifle
- Ilya Kalashnikov (born 1982), Russian footballer
- Marina Kalashnikova, Russian historian and freelance journalist
- Maxim Kalashnikov (born 1966), Russian writer and political activist
- Nicholas Kalashnikoff, Russian writer whose books include Jumper, Toyon, Yakub and The Defender
- Nikolay Kalashnikov (born 1940), Russian Olympic water polo player
- Oksana Kalashnikova, Georgian tennis player playing in the ITF Women's Circuit
- Oleg Kalashnikov (1962−2015), Ukrainian politician, murdered in 2015
- Victor Kalashnikov (1942–2018), Russian small arms designer, son of Mikhail Kalashnikov
- Viktor Kalashnikov (journalist), Russian journalist and ex-KGB officer
- Viktor Kalashnikov (politician) (1940–2023), Russian politician
- Vladimir Kalashnikov (born 1953), Russian footballer and coach
- Vyacheslav Kalashnikov (born 1985), Russian footballer
- Alexander Kalashnikov (born in the 1890s), Ukrainian anarchist and commander in the Revolutionary Insurgent Army of Ukraine

== Fictional characters ==
- From "The Song of the Merchant Kalashnikov", a 1837 poem by Mikhail Lermontov
