= Ruane =

Surname

Ruane is a surname. Notable people with the surname include:

- Billy Ruane (1957–2010), Boston, Massachusetts, United States, music promoter, and the son of investment manager William J. Ruane
- Caitríona Ruane MLA (born 1962), Sinn Féin politician and a member of the Northern Ireland Assembly for South Down
- Chris Ruane (born 1958), Welsh Labour Party politician who has been the Member of Parliament (MP) for the Vale of Clwyd since 1997
- Christopher Gerald Ruane (born 1986), Musician and American Football Player who has won 3 National Minor League Championships. Founder of Hat Trix Music and the California Buckeyes.
- Frances P. Ruane, director of the Economic and Social Research Institute (ESRI) in Dublin, Ireland
- J. Michael Ruane (1927–2006), American politician who represented the 7th Essex district in the Massachusetts House of Representatives
- James Ruane, Irish Gaelic footballer
- James O. Ruane (born 1972), American lawyer
- John Ruane (1936–2006), American jockey in thoroughbred horse racing
- Kevin Ruane (1932–2018), English journalist
- Martin Ruane (1946–1998), English professional wrestler of Irish descent better known as Giant Haystacks
- Paul Ruane, former Republican member of the Pennsylvania House of Representatives
- Seán Ruane, Irish politician
- William "Skippy" Rohan (1871–1916), American gangster born William Ruane
- Terry Ruane (1946–2024), English deaf actor and director
- Thomas Ruane, Irish politician
- Tom Ruane, Captain of the Second Western Division of the Irish Republican Army, from 1916 to 1920
- William J. Ruane (1925–2005), Wall Street investment manager and philanthropist
- William Ruane (born 1985), Scottish actor
- Willie Ruane (born 1975), Irish rugby player

== See also ==
- Ruane, Cunniff & Goldfarb based in New York City is the investment firm founded in 1969 by William J. Ruane and Richard T. Cunniff
