= PP-19 Bizon =

Russian submachine gun

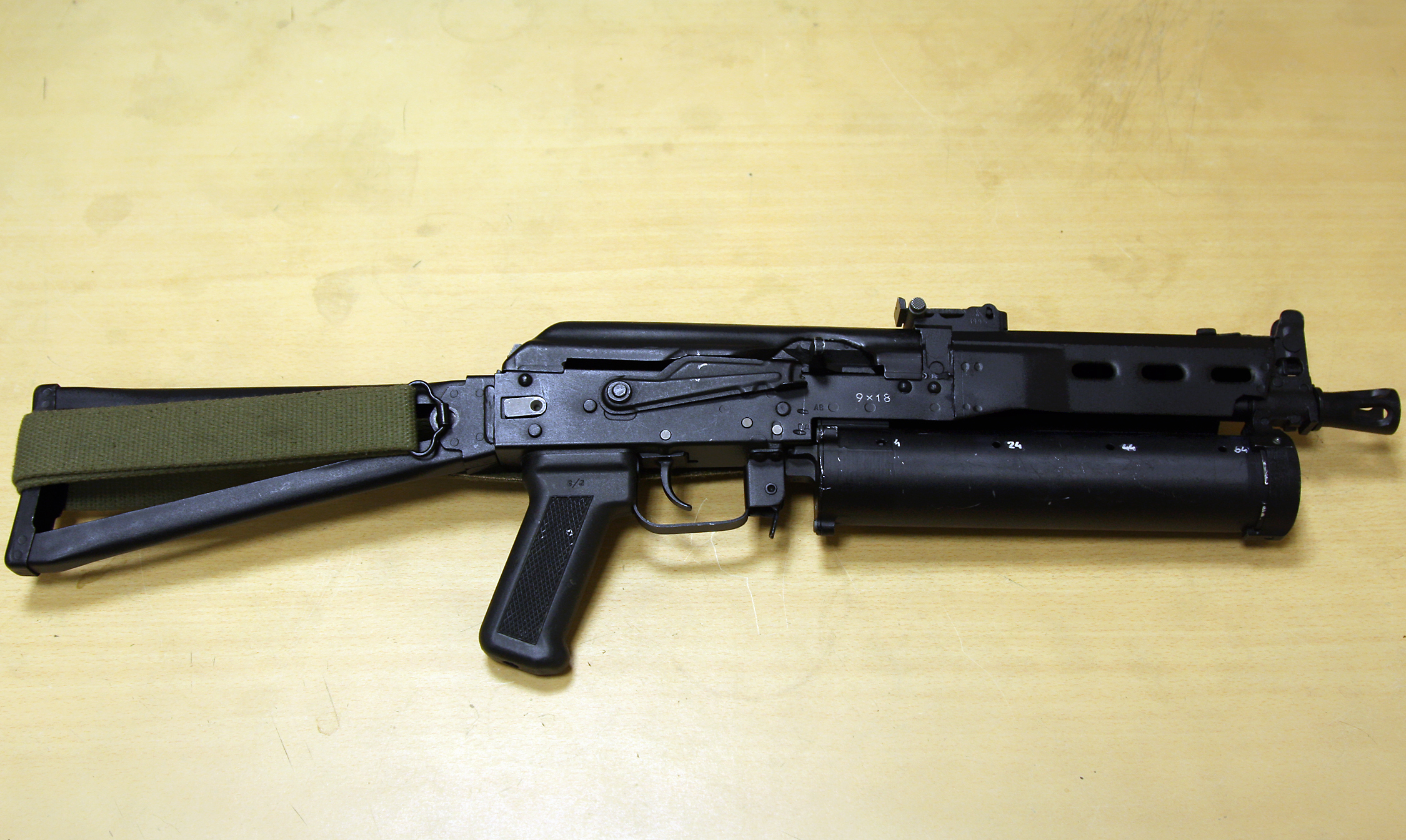
- PP-19 Bizon-2
- Type: Submachine gun
- Place of origin: Russia

Service history
- In service: 1996–present
- Used by: See Users

Production history
- Designer: Victor Kalashnikov, Alexei Dragunov
- Designed: 1993–1995
- Manufacturer: Izhmash
- Produced: 1996–present
- Variants: See Variants

Specifications
- Mass: 2.1 kg (4.63 lb)
- Length: 660 mm (26.0 in) stock extended / 425 mm (16.7 in) stock folded (Bizon); 690 mm (27.2 in) stock extended / 460 mm (18.1 in) stock folded (Bizon-2)
- Barrel length: 195 mm (7.7 in) (Bizon); 230 mm (9.1 in) (Bizon-2 9×18mm Makarov); 225 mm (8.9 in) (Bizon-2-01 9×19mm Parabellum)
- Cartridge: 9×18mm Makarov; 9×19mm Parabellum.380 ACP (9×17mm Short); 7.62×25mm Tokarev
- Action: Blowback, closed bolt
- Rate of fire: 680 rounds/min (9×18mm Makarov); 700–750 rounds/min (9×19mm Parabellum, 7.62×25mm Tokarev)
- Muzzle velocity: 320 m/s (1,050 ft/s) (9×18mm Makarov); 380 m/s (1,246.7 ft/s) (9×19mm Parabellum)
- Effective firing range: 100 m (9×18mm Makarov); 200 m (9×19mm Parabellum)
- Feed system: 64-round helical magazine (9×18mm Makarov); 53-round helical magazine (9×19mm Parabellum) (Bizon-2-01)
- Sights: Open front post, rear flip-up notch

The PP-19 Bizon (Russian: Пистолет Пулемёт Бизон, Pistolet Pulemyot Bizon, Pistol Submachine Gun "Bison") is a 9×18mm Makarov submachine gun developed in 1993 by the Russian company Izhmash.

== History ==
The Bizon was designed by a team of engineers headed by Victor Kalashnikov (son of engineer Mikhail Kalashnikov, creator of the AK-47) and including Alexei Dragunov (youngest son of Yevgeny Dragunov, the creator of the SVD sniper rifle).

Victor called the Bizon "The Woman's Gun" due to it being light with virtually no recoil.

The Bizon was developed at the request of the Russian Ministry of Internal Affairs (MVD) and is primarily intended for counter-terrorist and law enforcement units that need accurate fire at close ranges.

Prototypes were trialed by the Special Equipment Research Institute in 1995 where they outperformed several competitors. The weapon was accepted into service on 28 December 1996.

== Design details ==
The Bizon is a lightweight selective fire weapon that fires from a closed bolt, a feature that enhances the gun's practical accuracy.

The weapon has a notably large magazine capacity for the size of it, made possible by the uncommon helical design of the magazine.

It is based on the AKS-74U and shares 60% of its parts with the AK-74.

Chambered for the standard Russian 9×18mm Makarov pistol cartridge, the Bizon will also fire a new high-impulse armor-piercing 57-N-181SM round.

=== Operating mechanism ===
The Bizon uses a simple straight blowback method of operation; an unlocked breech system reduces cost and build complexity.

The Bizon's operating cycle is characterized by a very short recoil stroke; standard 9×18mm ammunition will only drive the bolt partially to the rear of the receiver and results in a cyclic rate of 680 rounds per minute.

High-impulse ammunition drives the bolt all the way to the end of the receiver, lightly striking the receiver wall.

A rate of fire of 700–750 rounds per minute is the result. Due to the slow cyclic rate, it has the effect of reducing perceived recoil and increasing firing stability and hit probability.

=== Features ===
The Bizon has no gas system and the internal components have been modified accordingly. The bolt carrier with fixed charging handle was recycled from the AK, but the piston rod and rotary bolt were removed and the piston extension was plugged with a steel insert. The return spring and guide rod are identical to those of the AK.

The Bizon has a four-groove barrel with a 240 mm (1:9 in) right-hand rifling pitch. The gun's muzzle device has a large rectangular port on each side of dead center that serves to reduce muzzle jump, although the main purpose of this device is to protect the muzzle and magazine from impact damage.

The pinned and riveted sheet metal receiver of the Bizon is derived from the AKS-74 and has been modified at the front end, since the gas system was omitted. The handguard is a sheet metal stamping with three rounded rectangular ventilation slots on each side.

The magazine serves as the lower handguard and the current models of the magazine are ribbed to enhance grip. The Bizon also uses the same trigger and safety mechanisms as the AK-74 rifle. The selector lever is placed on the right side of the receiver, above the trigger, and has three settings: the uppermost "safe" setting disables the trigger and in this position the lever physically blocks the bolt's integral retracting handle; the middle position (marked "АВ") enables fully automatic fire and the lowest position ("ОД") will activate the semi-automatic function of the trigger. An original five-piece anti-bounce device is built into the trigger unit and this functions as a rate reducer, delaying firing until the bolt has settled entirely into battery.

The Bizon also utilizes the AKS-74u side folding stock. It folds to the left side of the receiver but unlike the AKS-74 and AKS-74U, it is not held closed by a spring-loaded capture in the forward end of the receiver. Instead, it is held closed by the forward trunnion pin which is longer on the Bizon than on its AKS-74 predecessors. The extended length of the pin allows it to catch the folding skeleton stock. The pistol grip is identical to the grip on the AK-100 series and is made of a black fiberglass-reinforced polyamide.

=== Feeding ===
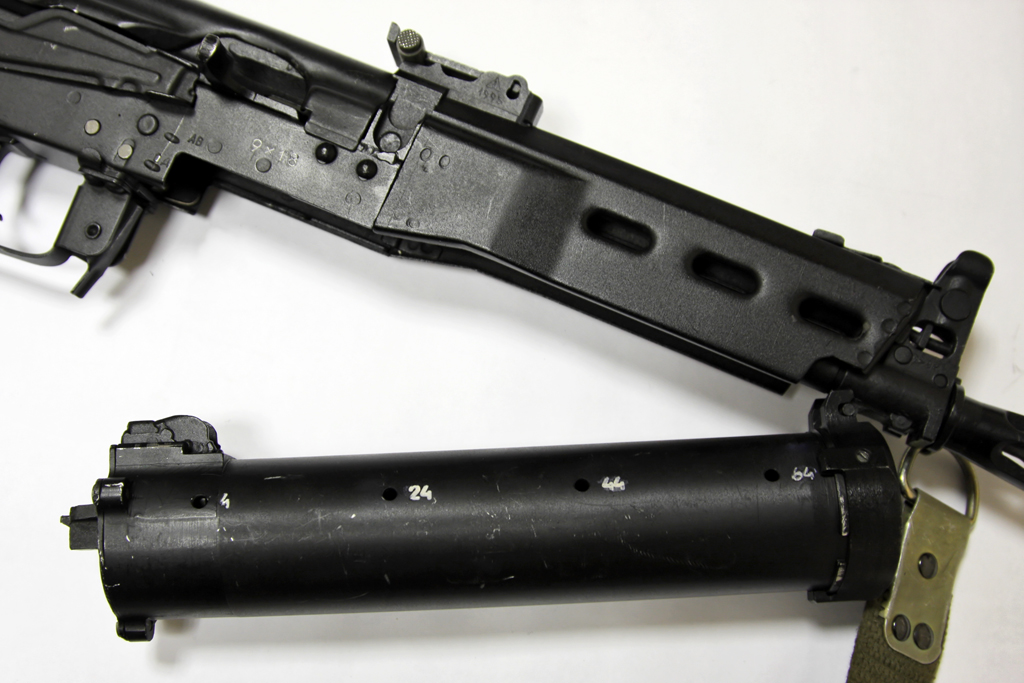
The Bizon SMG with detached magazine. Demonstrated is the hinge-like action required to seat the magazine

One of the Bizon's more unusual features is the magazine, which is often mistaken for a grenade launcher. The cylinder below the barrel is in fact a 64-round helical-feed magazine, similar to the type used in the American Calico M960 submachine gun.

The magazine is made from a durable glass-reinforced polyamide 6 and mounts under the handguard in line with the barrel. This layout makes the weapon more compact and concealable compared to a standard drum or stick magazine. All cartridges are aligned nose forward in the Bizon magazine and cannot be loaded incorrectly.

Early magazines were fabricated from aluminium tubing and had a capacity of 67 rounds. The production magazine capacity of 64 rounds was selected as 64 is a multiple of 16, and 9×18mm Makarov rounds are packaged in boxes of 16.

The magazine has hooks on top of the front end that engage a pair of pins under the front sight, and the rear end of the magazine interfaces with a Kalashnikov pattern spring-loaded paddle type magazine catch/release located in front of the trigger guard.

Some magazines were produced with indicator holes allowing the user to verify the amount of ammunition loaded; these are spaced at 4, 24, 44 and 64-round increments.

=== Sights ===
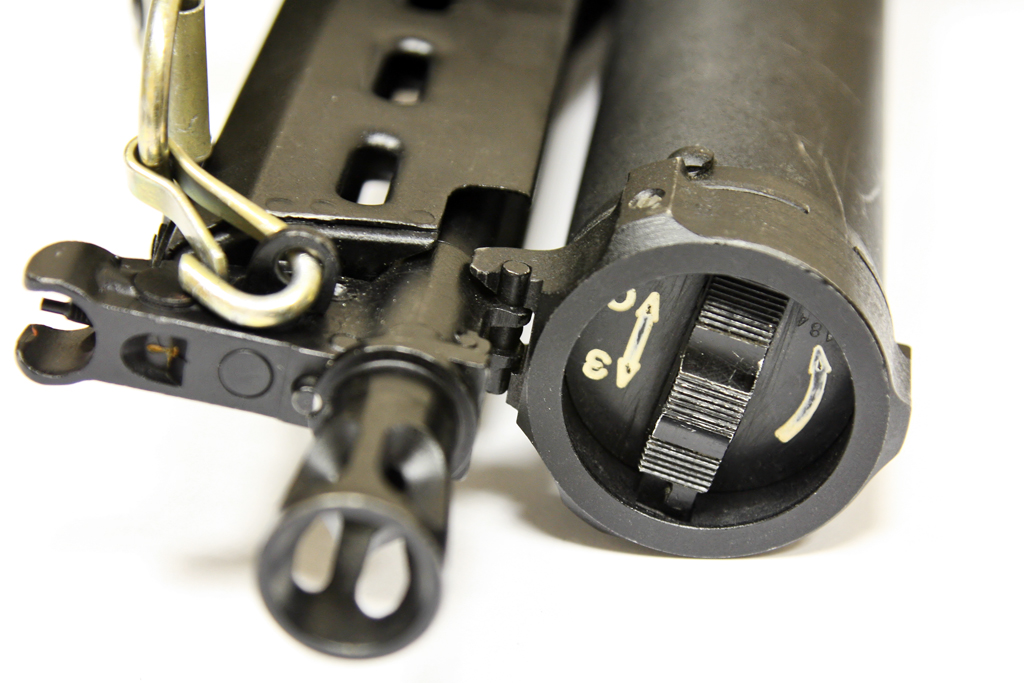
Detailed view of the front sight and magazine

The sighting arrangement resembles that used on the AK-74 and consists of a rear flip-up sight permanently attached to the receiver top cover with two open square notches with 50 m and 100 m elevation settings and a round post front sight taken from the AK series of rifles, common to many Russian small arms. The front sight is contained in a protective cage with a hole in the top to insert an elevation adjustment tool, while the rear sight is shielded by two metal ears.

=== Accessories ===
The gun is issued with one magazine, a sling, cleaning kit, oil can and magazine pouch.

Other accessories such as scope mounts, Kobra optics and PBS1 sound suppressors were available due to it being largely derived from the AK-74/47 family, thus having the correct thread and AK optics side mount.

== Variants ==
The original Bizon was retroactively designated Bizon-1 after the design was improved with the introduction of the Bizon-2.

=== Bizon-2 ===
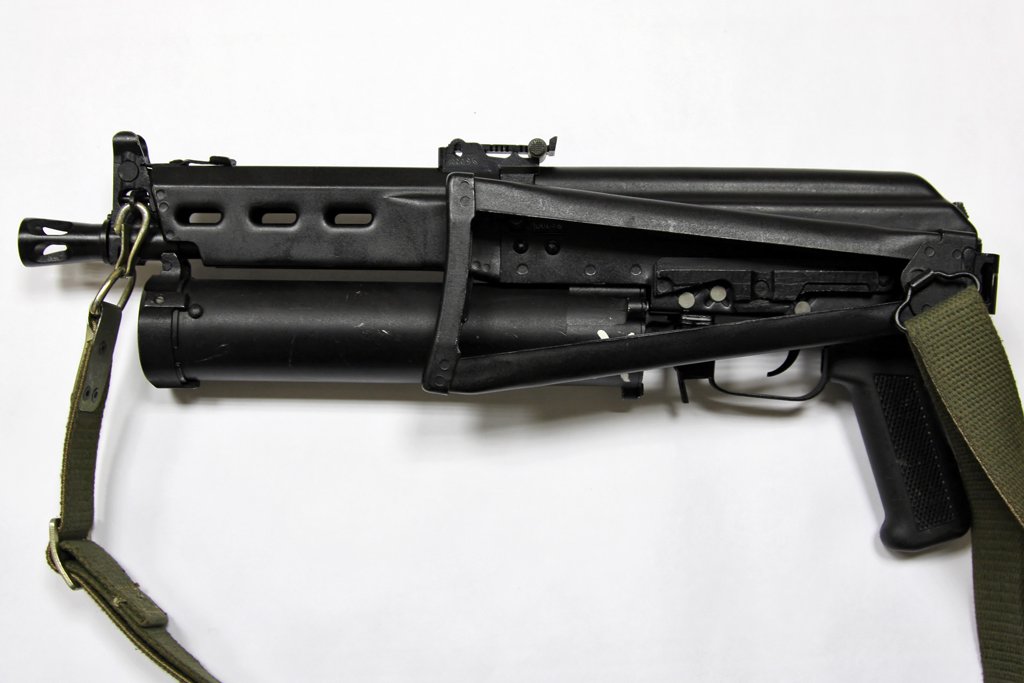
Left side with folded buttstock

The Bizon has been continuously modified over its production life, and an improved variant is known as the Bizon-2.

It features AK-style iron sights (an open U-notch rear sight on a tangent with three settings: 50, 100 and 150 m and a semi-shrouded front post), a receiver-mounted side rail adapter for optics and a new slotted flash hider designed to accept a quick-detachable sound suppressor.

The Bizon-2 is made in several variants to increase the product's commercial appeal and demonstrate its versatility; it is offered in 8 different configurations:

Variant	Configuration	Ammunition	Magazine	Other offerings
Bizon-2-01	Submachine gun	9×19mm Parabellum	53-round	NATO-standard cartridge
Bizon-2-02	Submachine gun	.380 ACP	64-round	
Bizon-2-03	Submachine gun	9×18mm Makarov	64-round	Integral sound suppressor
Bizon-2-04	Carbine	9×18mm Makarov	64-round	Semi-automatic
Bizon-2-05	Submachine gun	9×19mm Parabellum	53-round	Semi-automatic
Bizon-2-06	Carbine	.380 ACP	64-round	
Bizon-2-07	Submachine gun	7.62×25mm Tokarev	35-round	Conventional staggered-column steel box magazine

=== Bizon-3 ===
A variant known as the Bizon-3 was also developed and features a flip-up rear peep sight moved further to the rear on the receiver cover and a stock that folds up and over the receiver to lock into a spring-loaded latch on the receiver top cover.

The Bizon-3's barrel has an adapter for several types of muzzle devices. These are selected by the operator depending on the weapon's tactical employment and include sound suppressors, muzzle brakes, compensators, and flash hiders.

== Derivatives ==
=== Vityaz-SN ===
A further evolution of the PP-19 Bizon, the Vityaz is chambered in 9×19mm Parabellum. It entered Russian service in 2005, and continues to be the country's standard issue submachine gun for all military and police forces.

==== PPK-20 ====
A subcompact, further modernisation of the PP-19-01 Vityaz-SN.

=== SN9P ===
Vietnamese 9×19mm Bizon clone manufactured by the Z111 Factory of the Vietnam General Department of Defense Industry.

The SN9P features modifications such as a Galil-style stock to suit local conditions, with limited use by Special Forces units.

=== SN7P ===
Vietnamese Bizon clone chambered for 7.62x25mm, also manufactured by the Z111 Factory.

== Service ==
The Bizon is issued to armed response units of the Federal Security Service (FSB) and the Ministry of Justice in Russia.

It was used in combat operations against separatists in the North Caucasus region, namely Chechnya and Dagestan.

The Bizon has been largely replaced by the PP-19-01 Vityaz in Russian service, which was developed directly from the design of the Bizon, due to reliability issues with the helical magazine.

== Users ==
- Russia
- Vietnam: Clones as the SN7P and SN9P.

== See also ==
- PP-90
- PP-90M1
