= Tom Mardirosian =

Armenian-American actor (born 1947)

- Born: December 14, 1947 (age 78); Buffalo, New York, US
- Occupation: Actor
- Years active: 1980–present

Tom Mardirosian (born December 14, 1947) is an American actor. He is known for playing Agamemnon Busmalis in the HBO show Oz and Agt. Kristos Koutris in the HBO show The Wire.

Mardirosian was born and raised in Buffalo, New York, the son of Armenian parents Afro (née Karahos) and Matthew Mardirosian. In the army, he was a member of a Special Forces troop, where he first started developing his love for acting. After his army service he appeared in numerous productions in Buffalo, and was taught acting at The Studio ARENA Theatre School. He appeared on Broadway at the Cort Theatre in The Magic Show as Goldfarb.

Mardirosian is strongly involved with the Armenian General Benevolent Union (AGBU) within New York City. His brother is the actor and writer Oliver Clark.

== Filmography ==
=== Film ===
Years	Title	Role	Notes
1983	Trading Places	Officer Pantuzzi	
1984	Alphabet City	Benny	Night Club Owner
1986	Eat and Run	Scarpetti	
1988	Shakedown	Insane Cab Driver	
1987	The Rosary Murders	Detective Fallon	
1990	Presumed Innocent	Nico Della Guardia	
1992	Quiet Killer	Deputy Mayor Kaprow	TV film
1992	Boomerang	Salesman	
1993	The Dark Half	Rick Crowley	
1994	Don Juan DeMarco	Baba the Eunuch	
2014	Let's Be Cops	Georgie	
2019	Abe	Salim	

=== Television ===
Years	Title	Role	Notes
1980	Seizure: The Story of Kathy Morris	Bus Driver	TV movie
1980	Ryan's Hope	Norris	Episode #1.1337
1982	Muggable Mary, Street Cop	Maitre'D	TV movie
1982	The Neighborhood	Customer	TV movie
1984	Another World	Bates	
1985	American Masters	Michael Anagnos	Episode: "Becoming Helen Keller
1986	Rockabye	Cab Driver #1	TV movie
1986	Miami Vice	Leo Cryson	Episode: "Streetwise"
1987	Guiding Light	Hitman's Medic	
1989	The Equalizer	Arnoff	Episode: "Time Present, Time Past"
1989	True Blue	UN Ambassador	Episode: "Pilot: Part 1"
1990	Kojak: None So Blind	Weiss	TV movie
1991–2006	Law & Order	Brian Doxsee / Joe Tashjian / Mr. Butler / Mr. Stubelski / Nicky Avakian / Judge Keith Fischer	7 episodes
1992	Black Death	Kaprow	TV movie
1992	Miss Rose White	Henry	TV movie
1992	L.A. Law	Gary Lowery	Episode: "Silence Of The Lambskins"
1992	With Murder in Mind		TV movie
1994	Nurses	Mr. Parry	Episode: "The One After the Earthquake"
1994	Love & War	Merchant	Episode: "A New York Yankee in Queen Dana's Court"
1995	NYPD Blue	Mr. Kasinzakas	Episode: "Torah! Torah! Torah!"
1996	If Looks Could Kill	Police Captain	TV movie
1996	Voice from the Grave	Judge Bacon	TV movie
1998–2003	Oz	Agamemnon 'The Mole' Busmalis	47 episodes
2003	Queens Supreme	Mr. Ali	Episode: "Permanent Markers"
2003	The Wire	Agent Kristos Koutris	3 episodes
2004	The Jury	Darryl	Episode: "Mail Order Mystery"
2006	The Bedford Diaries	Thaddeus Cole	2 episodes
2008	New Amsterdam	Samar	Episode: "Honor"
2009	The Philanthropist	Caller from Buffalo	Episode: "Kashmir"
2012	Blue Bloods	Connie	Episode: "The Uniform"
2014	Elementary	Artem Dedekian	Episode: "The Adventure of the Nutmeg Concoction"
2016	Mom	Priest	Episode: "Diabetic Lesbians and a Blushing Bride"
2016	Bosch	Joey Marks	3 episodes
2019	City on a Hill	Father Bender	Episode: "If Only the Fool Would Persist in His Folly"
2021	The Blacklist	Hashem Mojtabai	Episode: "The SPK (No. 178)"

=== Videogames ===
Years	Title	Role
2005	Bully	Mr. Smith
2015	Evolve	Lazarus
