= The Defender (Kalashnikoff novel) =

1951 novel by Nicholas Kalashnikoff

- First edition
- Author: Nicholas Kalashnikoff
- Illustrator: Claire Louden and George Louden, Jr.
- Language: English
- Genre: Children's Literature
- Publisher: Scribner
- Publication date: 1951
- Publication place: United States
- Media type: Print
- Pages: 130 pp
- ISBN: 0-8027-7397-4

The Defender is a children's novel by Nicholas Kalashnikoff. Set deep within the mountains of Siberia, the novel is about an ostracized shepherd who defends the mountain rams from hunters. The novel, illustrated by Claire Louden and George Louden, was first published in 1951 and was a Newbery Honor recipient in 1952.

== Plot ==
The story is about a Lamut (Evens) named Turgen, whose family is killed by an illness which left him alone to his practice of medicine in his yurt. Out of his loneliness, he befriends a group of rams near his yurt. This causes the townspeople and the local shaman to start rumors that he must be a sorcerer, because it is impossible for a man to befriend animals; he is shunned because of it.

While coming back from his usual fishing and hunting rounds, he hears crying from another yurt and decides to help. He goes inside the yurt to see two children: Tim, and an infant named Aska. Turgen stays to tend to the children. Soon, Marfa, the mother of the children, comes from working to see Turgen tending to her children. Rather than being angry, she is surprised to find him in her home. Marfa's late husband was one of the few people who hadn't listened to the rumors about Turgen.

From that point on, he frequently drops by to see Marfa and her children, and brings them meats and salts to ease Marfa's workload. On these visits Turgen reveals how he used to hunt the rams for sport, but eventually it saddened him to see the rams being hunted for their horns and meat. Turgen set out to gain the ram's trust by feeding them every day. As time passed he began to bond with the herd of rams, observing them as they ate and protecting them from bears and wolves to the best of his ability.

In the middle of September, hunting season begins, and hunters start to come to the mountains to hunt the rams. Turgen takes on the responsibility of guiding the rams to a safer spot in the mountains. With the help of Marfa and her children he leads the rams to safety. The hunters threaten his life in response.

Marfa pleads with the hunters to listen to reason and to Turgen's story. Turgen speaks with the hunters and tells them to ignore the shaman's words, since he was visited by a spirit for helping the rams. The villagers begin to believe a spirit haunted Turgen, and that he is now free since the rams are gone. In the end Turgen is accepted back into the village, and he marries Marfa.

== Characters ==
- Turgen - An exiled man accuse of sorcery who befriends a group of rams, and later the defender of the rams.
- Shamanist - A jealous village shaman who starts the rumor of Turgen's sorcery.
- Marfa - A widowed Lamut who does not believe the rumor told about Turgen, and befriends him in his time of need.
- Tim - Marfa's first-born son.
- Aska - Marfa's second-born daughter.
- The Rams - The rams that Turgen protects and feeds throughout the story consist of 3 females, 4 males including the leader, and 2 baby rams.
