= Battle of Bryansk =

World War II battle

- Part of the Eastern Front of World War II
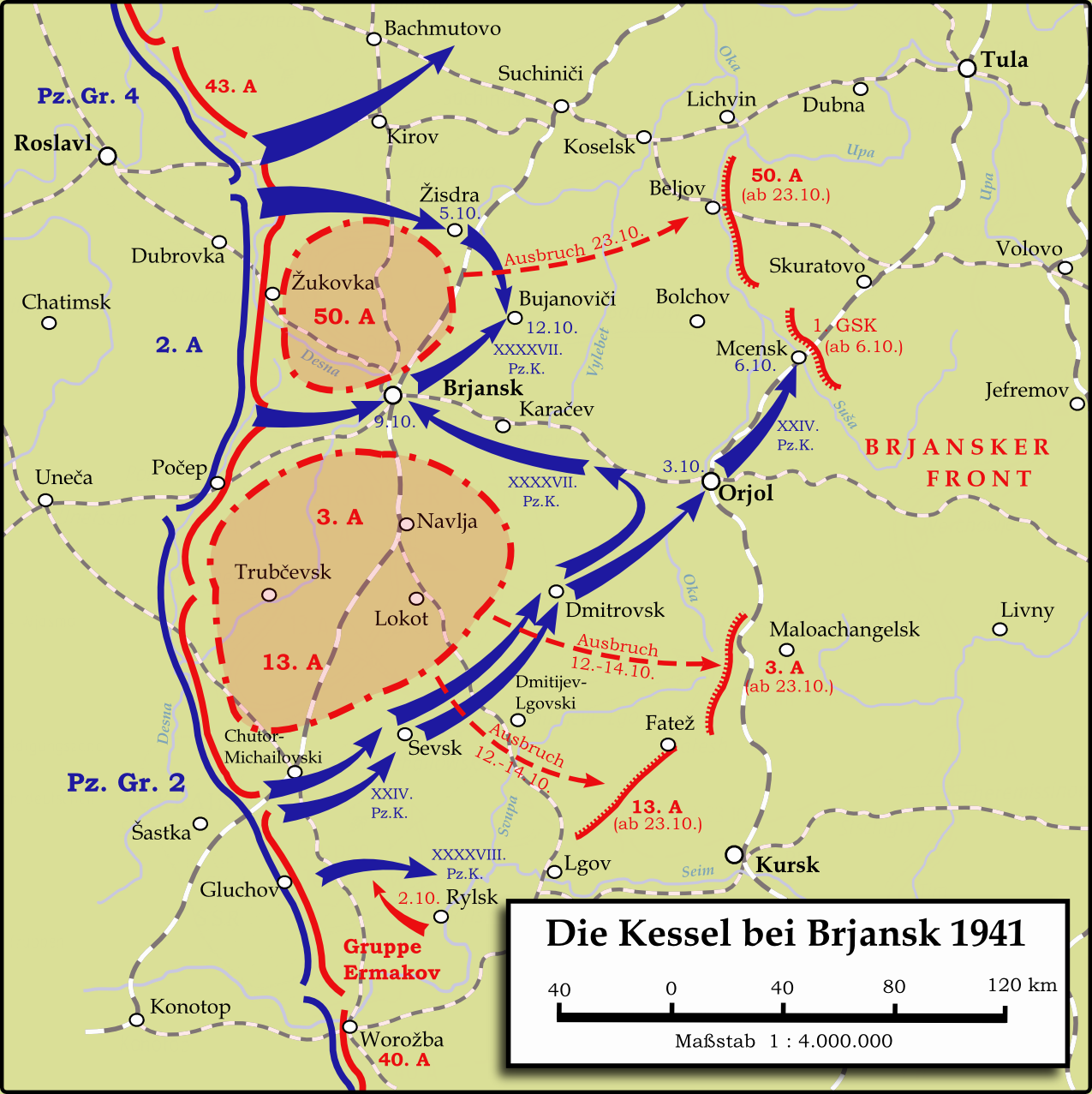
- Encirclement of Soviet armies near Bryansk
Date	30 September – 21 October 1941
Location	Bryansk, Soviet Union
Result	German victory

Belligerents
Germany	Soviet Union

Commanders and leaders
(Nazi Germany) Fedor von Bock (Nazi Germany) Heinz Guderian (Nazi Germany) Maximilian von Weichs	(Soviet Union) Andrey Yeryomenko (Soviet Union) Semyon Timoshenko (Soviet Union) Georgy Zhukov

Units involved
2nd Army; 2nd Panzer Army	(Soviet Union) 50th Army (Soviet Union) 13th Army (Soviet Union) 3rd Army

Strength
Unknown	Unknown

Casualties and losses
48,000 killed or wounded	100,000 killed or missing 600,000 captured

The Battle of Bryansk (30 September – 21 October 1941) was a battle during World War II conducted in the Bryansk Oblast as a part of the overall Moscow campaign. Returning from the Kiev operation, Heinz Guderian attacked in an unexpected direction capturing Bryansk and Oryol with few casualties thereby encircling two Soviet formations, the 13th Army and 3rd Army. A third Soviet formation, the 50th Army was encircled by infantry of the German 2nd Army north of Bryansk. However the encircled Red Army units continued fighting, delaying the drive on Moscow for two weeks. This delay, as well as the casualties taken by the Wehrmacht liquidating the pockets contributed to the German collapse at the gates of Moscow. See also: Vyazma and Bryansk pockets. As a result of this battle, the Germans occupied Bryansk until they were expelled by the Red Army on 17 September 1943 as a part of the Smolensk campaign.

== Background and planning ==
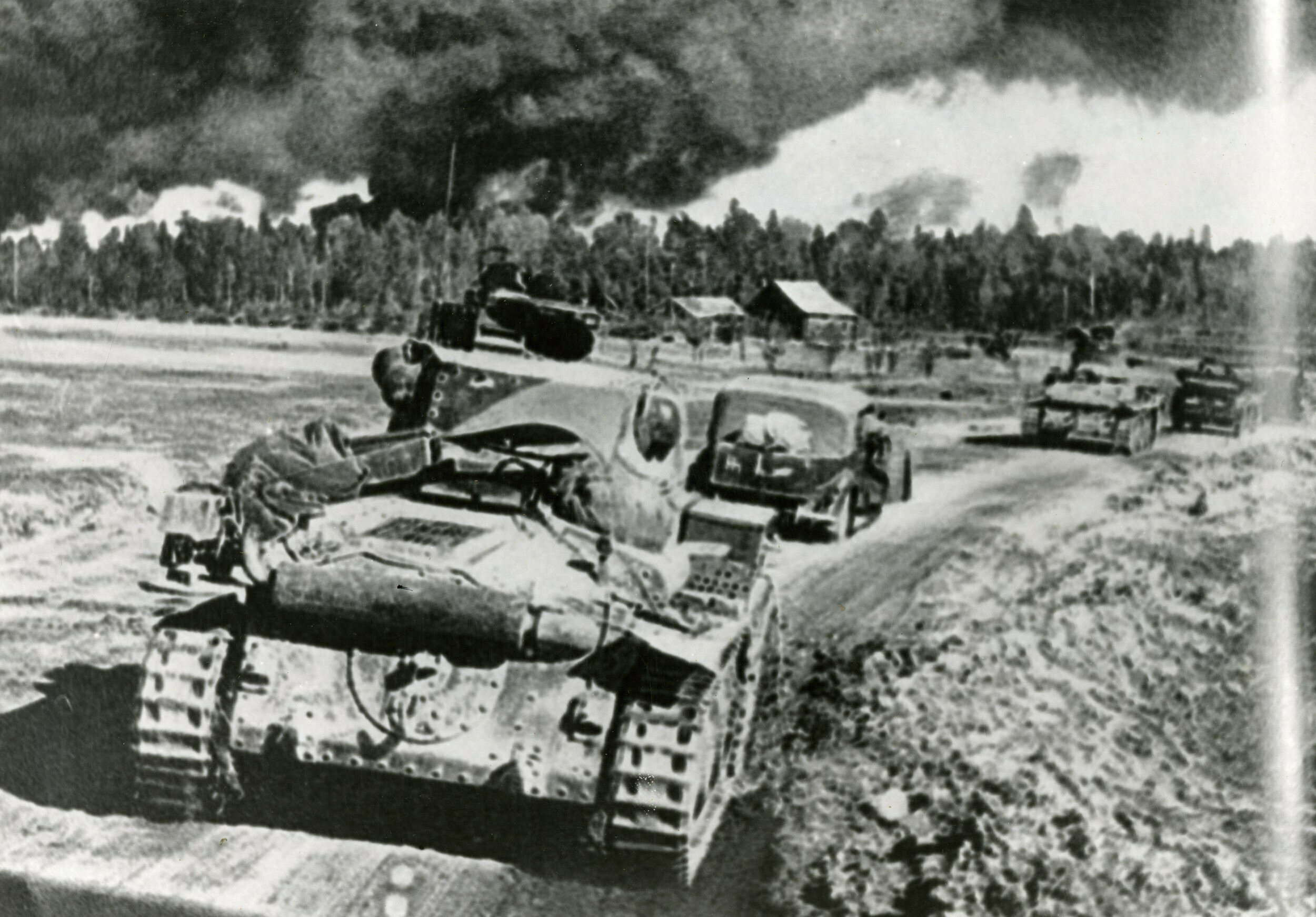
German armoured forces race towards Vyazma, October 1941.

After the successful encirclement of the reconstituted Western Front in the Smolensk pocket, the tanks of Army Group Centre were ordered to halt so that the infantry could catch up and liquidate the pocket. Further to the north, Army Group North had stalled out in the drive towards Leningrad, and Army Group South was struggling to take Kiev. To secure the flanks of Army Group Center, Hitler ordered that the 3rd Panzer Army be diverted north and the 2nd Panzer Army be diverted south. Army Group Centre's infantry formations, the 4th Army and 9th Army were ordered to dig in and wait for their flanks to be secured.

During the "lull" in the offensive, the Red Army General Staff, the Stavka ordered Red Army formations around Smolensk and Bryansk to conduct frontal assaults on Army Group Center in an effort to drive the Wehrmacht back from the approaches to Moscow. The offensives were conducted over poor terrain against units in strong defensive positions and nearly all of them were disasters that seriously weakened Red Army formations defending the approaches to Moscow.

== Operation ==
In September 1941, the German troops of XLVII. Armeekorps (mot.) (commander General of Panzer troops Joachim Lemelsen) advanced towards, and crossed the Desna River in the region southwest of Moscow. During the breakthrough attack, the German troops broke through the Bryansk Front on 30 September, during the operation to encircle the 50th Army. This resulted in the penetration of the Front's position between the 50th and 13th Armies. The Bryansk Front commander Andrei Yeremenko adopted a defence in depth strategy, with the Front's reserves consisting of two rifle, one tank division and one tank brigade concentrated in the Bryansk area. However, in the course of the operation the troops of the XXXXVII Corps took Karachev and were able to advance to east of the city on 6 October while trying to link up with the XXXXIII Corps coming from the opposite direction.

This forced the Red Army's 50th and 13th Armies and the Operational Group of General Major A.N. Yermakov to withdraw in order to avoid encirclement, and consequently Bryansk was evacuated without significant fighting. Regardless of this, the city was subjected to heavy artillery and air bombardment which destroyed large parts of Bryansk.

The Red Army, as part of the Orel-Bryansk Defensive Operation (30 September 1941 – 23 October 1941) lost over 80,000 killed in and around the area of the city, with around 4,062 soldiers injured and hospitalized Another 50,000 prisoners were taken, before XXXXVII Corps proceeded on to its next objective, Orel.

== Aftermath ==
By virtue of Guderian's one-armed encirclement, the Germans had destroyed all of the Red Army forces defending the southern approaches to Moscow, opening the way to Tula. Tula stood at the center of the road and rail network south of Moscow and its capture was vital to the Moscow Offensive. After the encirclement of the Bryansk Front, Guderian was closer to Tula than the nearest Red Army formation. However, the delay in liquidating the pocket bought the Stavka precious time to rush in reinforcements south of Moscow, stabilizing the front. When Guderian resumed the drive, he failed to capture Tula, and instead opted to bypass the city. This put a severe logistical constraint on the rest of the Moscow campaign. When Stalin ordered the Moscow Counter-Attack in December, Red Army control of Tula forced Guderian to withdraw the 2nd Panzer Army from Moscow, in violation of a direct order from Hitler. This resulted in Guderian's dismissal in January 1942. In honor of its determined stand, Tula was awarded the title of Hero City in 1976.

=== Inspiration for the AK-47 ===
Mikhail Kalashnikov was a senior sergeant (tank commander) serving on the T-34s of the 24th Tank Regiment, 12th Tank Division of the 8th Mechanised Corps stationed in Stryi (31 KV-1 and 10 T-34 tanks) before retreating after the Battle of Brody, with the regiment soon to become a part of the 159th Tank Brigade. He was wounded during the battle, but made it to a hospital on foot, where he received medical attention. This was not Kalashnikov's first battle as he had also participated in the Battle of Brody where his division was part of the 8th Mechanized Corps that encountered the German 16th Panzer Division in battle around Leshuv. While recovering from his injuries, Kalashnikov started experiencing flashbacks of the raid and "became obsessed with creating a submachine gun that would drive the Germans from his homeland. Many believe the myth he mostly just copied the Sturmgewehr 44. However when examined, the Sturmgewehr 44 is very different in regards to the bolt design and operation, the disassembly method and contains a completely different style firing mechanism. Essentially the Sturmgewehr 44 has many more similarities to the HK G3 rifle than the AK-47."
