= Power to Save the World =

- Author: Gwyneth Cravens
- Language: English
- Subject: nuclear power
- Publisher: Knopf
- Publication date: January 2007
- Publication place: United States
- Pages: 439
- ISBN: 978-0-307-26656-9

Power to Save the World: The Truth About Nuclear Energy (Knopf, 2007), by Gwyneth Cravens, is an introduction to the benefits of nuclear power and the science behind it. It is written for members of the lay public who want to learn more about nuclear power, environmentalists concerned about global warming due to fossil fuel combustion; and scientists and others who work in the nuclear world.

== Synopsis ==
In the book, Cravens, a skeptic about nuclear energy who actively protested the plan to open Shoreham Nuclear Power Plant on Long Island, New York, has a conversation about nuclear power while visiting friends in Albuquerque. One of them, Dr. Richard (Rip) Anderson, a scientist at Sandia National Laboratories, listens to her beliefs about how deadly nuclear plants are and gently suggests that she is not quite correct by describing how nuclear power actually works. After more discussions, Anderson suggests that she accompany him and his wife on a tour of the United States visiting power plants, national laboratories and the Yucca Mountain nuclear waste repository.

Cravens, after interviewing leading researchers, engineers, and experts in the fields of nuclear fission and radiation, public health, counterterrorism, and risk assessment, concludes that nuclear power is clean and safe. Exploration of the issues from multiple points of view and her own observations reveal to her that nuclear fission as a power source is being economically and cleanly harnessed in the U.S. She finds that in countries like France and Sweden, which both derive considerable energy from nuclear plants, the environment is far safer and cleaner than in those nations that continue to get most of their electricity from burning fossil fuels. She learns that in the worldwide energy industry - including wind and solar - nuclear power has by far the fewest deaths per terawatt-hour generated. She concludes that if we are to care for subsequent generations, embracing nuclear energy is an ethical imperative.
