= Victor Kalashnikov =

Russian small arms designer

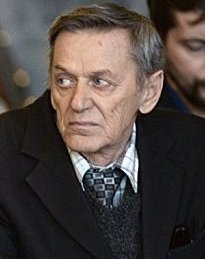
- Kalashnikov at his father Mikhail's funeral, December 2013
- Born: Victor Mikhailovich Kalashnikov; 16 July 1942; Kazakh SSR, Soviet Union
- Died: 27 March 2018 (aged 75); Izhevsk, Russia
- Occupation: Small arms designer
- Known for: Designer of the PP-19 Bizon
- Children: Mikhail and Aleksandr
- Parent(s): Mikhail Timofevich Kalashnikov, Ekaterina Viktorovna Kalashnikova
- Awards: Order of the Badge of Honour

Victor Mikhailovich Kalashnikov (Russian: Ви́ктор Миха́йлович Кала́шников; 16 July 1942 – 27 March 2018) was a Russian small arms designer known for developing the PP-19 Bizon submachine gun.

== Early life and education ==
Kalashnikov was born 16 July 1942 in Kazakh SSR, Soviet Union, the son of small arms designer Mikhail Kalashnikov, creator of the AK-47, and Ekaterina Viktorovna Kalashnikova.

Victor graduated in 1966 from a mechanical institute in Izhevsk in the Soviet Union.

== Career ==
Kalashnikov began his weapon designing career in 1966 by conducting a series of tests of the AK-47 and summarizing the factors that affect its stability, durability, and reliability. He was then involved in the development of self-loading hunting rifles.

He designed a number of parts and components and participated in developing self-loading hunting rifles and Kalashnikov machine guns. He led a group which designed the Bizon and Vityaz-SN submachine guns.

== Personal life ==
Kalashnikov had two sons, Mikhail and Aleksandr. He died 27 March 2018 at age 75 in Izhevsk, Russia.
