= Robert Goldfarb =

Money manager

Robert Goldfarb serves as president and CEO of Ruane, Cunniff & Goldfarb, the value investing firm founded in 1970 by William J. Ruane and Rick Cunniff. Goldfarb is a disciple of Warren Buffett, the CEO of Berkshire Hathaway. A native of St. Louis, Goldfarb received his B.A. from Yale University in 1967, where he graduated summa cum laude and Phi Beta Kappa, and went on to earn his M.B.A. from Harvard Business School in 1971. In 2010, Goldfarb and David Poppe were selected as Domestic-Stock mutual fund managers of the year by Morningstar, Inc. for the outstanding long-term performance of the Sequoia Fund.

On 23 March 2016 Sequoia Fund announced to shareholders the retirement of Robert Goldfarb as chief executive officer of the Sequoia Mutual Fund.
