= Journal of Public Health Management & Practice =

- Discipline: Public health
- Language: English
- Edited by: Lloyd F. Novick and Justin B. Moore

Publication details
- History: 1995-present
- Publisher: Lippincott Williams & Wilkins (USA)
- Frequency: Bimonthly
- Impact factor: 1.510 (2015)

Standard abbreviations
- ISO 4: J. Public Health Manag. Pract.

Indexing
- ISSN: 1078-4659 (print); 1550-5022 (web)
- LCCN: 95652816
- OCLC no.: 181819768

Links
- Journal homepage

The Journal of Public Health Management & Practice (JPHMP) is a bimonthly peer-reviewed public health journal, which was established in 1995 at Aspen Publishers. The editor-in-chief is Lloyd F. Novick and the associate editor is Justin B. Moore. According to the Journal Citation Reports, the journal has a 2015 impact factor of 1.510.

The journal publishes articles which cover a diverse range of population health topics, with information on public health practice and research. These topics include research to practice, emergency preparedness, bioterrorism, infectious disease surveillance, environmental health, community health assessment, chronic disease prevention and health promotion, and academic-practice linkages. Aside from the main journal issue, JPHMP also publishes a number of peer-reviewed special supplements and/or special topical sections that are sponsored by organizations interested in promoting their work.

== Editors ==
The journal's editor-in-chief is Justin B. Moore and the associate editors are Brian Castrucci, Jessica Malty Rivera, and Gulzar H. Shah. There are a few consulting editors for various health topics, including Public Health Ethics, Environmental & Occupational Health, Human Subjects Protection, Community-Based Practice, Biostatistics, and Infectious Diseases.
