= Mikhail Kalashnikov =

Russian firearms designer (1919–2013)

- Михаил Калашников
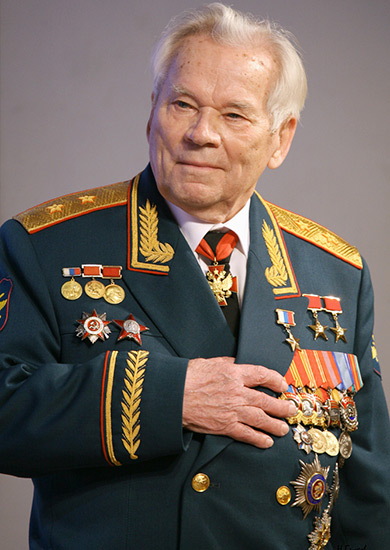

Deputy of the Supreme Soviet
- In office 1950–1958
- In office 1966–1989

Personal details
- Born: 10 November 1919 Kurya, Russian State
- Died: 23 December 2013 (aged 94) Izhevsk, Udmurtia, Russia
- Party: United Russia; CPRF (until 2001); CPSU (until 1991)
- Spouse: Yekaterina Kalashnikova (m. 1940; died 1977)
- Children: 4, including Victor
- Occupation: Small arms designer
- Known for: Designer of the AK-47, AKM, AK-74, RPK, and PK
- Awards: USSR State Prize (1959); Hero of Labour (1964); Stalin Prize (1978); Lenin Prize (2); Hero of the Russian Federation; Order of St. Andrew; Order For Merit to the Fatherland II cl.

Military service
- Allegiance: Soviet Union
- Branch/service: Red Army
- Years of service: 1938 – 1941
- Rank: Lieutenant general
- Battles/wars: World War II; Eastern Front; Battle of Brody; Battle of Bryansk

Mikhail Timofeyevich Kalashnikov (Note: In this name that follows East Slavic naming customs, the patronymic is Timofeyevich and the family name is Kalashnikov.) (Note: UK: /kəˈlæʃnɪkɒf/ kə-LASH-nik-off, US: /-ˈlɑːʃ-/ -LAHSH-; Russian: Михаил Тимофеевич Калашников, IPA: [mʲɪxɐˈil tʲɪmɐˈfʲejɪvʲɪtɕ kɐˈlaʂnʲɪkəf]) (10 November 1919 – 23 December 2013) was a Soviet and Russian lieutenant general, inventor, military engineer, writer, and small arms designer. He is most famous for developing the AK-47 assault rifle and its improvements, the AKM and AK-74, as well as the RPK light machine gun and PK machine gun.

Kalashnikov was, according to himself, a self-taught tinkerer who combined innate mechanical skills with the study of weaponry to design arms that achieved battlefield ubiquity. Even though Kalashnikov felt sorrow at the weapons' uncontrolled distribution, he took pride in his inventions and in their reputation for reliability, emphasizing that his rifle is "a weapon of defense" and "not a weapon for offense".

== Life and career ==
=== Early life ===
Kalashnikov was born in the village of Kurya, in present-day Altai Krai, Russia, as the seventeenth child of the 19 children of Aleksandra Frolovna Kalashnikova (born Kaverina) and Timofey Aleksandrovich Kalashnikov, who were peasants. In his youth, Mikhail suffered from various illnesses and was on the verge of death at age six. He was attracted to all kinds of machinery, but also wrote poetry, dreaming of becoming a poet. He later went on to write six books and continued to write poetry all of his life. In 1930, his father and most of his family had their properties confiscated and were deported as kulaks to the village of Nizhnyaya Mokhovaya, Tomsk Oblast. After deportation, his family had to combine farming with hunting, and thus Mikhail frequently used his father's rifle in his teens. Kalashnikov continued hunting into his 90s.

After completing seventh grade, Mikhail, with his stepfather's permission, left his family and returned to Kurya, hiking for nearly 1,000 km. In Kurya, he found a job in mechanics at a tractor station. A party organizer embedded within the factory noticed the man's dexterity and issued him a directive (napravlenie) to work at a nearby weapons design bureau, where he was employed as a tester of fitted stocks in rifles.

=== Military career ===
In 1938, he was conscripted into the Red Army. Because of his engineering skills he was assigned as a tank mechanic, and later became a tank commander. While training, he made his first inventions, which concerned not only tanks, but also small weapons, and was personally awarded a wrist watch by Georgy Zhukov. Kalashnikov served on the T-34s of the 24th Tank Regiment, 12th Tank Division stationed in Stryi before the regiment retreated after the Battle of Brody in June 1941. He was wounded in combat in the Battle of Bryansk in October 1941 and hospitalised until April 1942. In the last few months of being in hospital, he overheard some fellow soldiers bemoaning their current rifles, which were plagued with reliability issues, such as jamming. As he continued to overhear the complaints that the Soviet soldiers had, as soon as he was discharged, he went to work on what would become the famous AK-47 assault rifle.

=== Weapons development ===
Seeing the drawbacks of the standard infantry weapons at the time, he decided to construct a new rifle for the Soviet military. During this time Kalashnikov began designing a submachine gun. Although his first submachine gun design was not accepted into service, his talent as a designer was noticed. From 1942 onwards, Kalashnikov was assigned to the Central Scientific-developmental Firing Range for Rifle Firearms of the Chief Artillery Directorate of the Red Army.

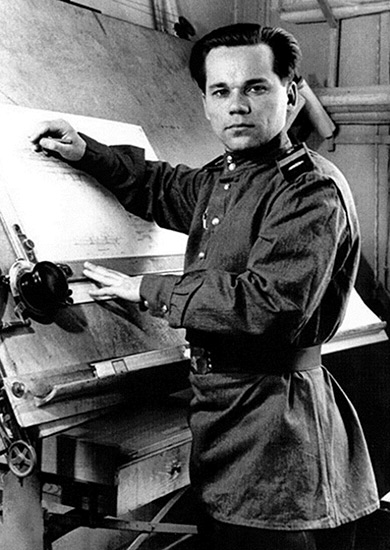
Kalashnikov, c. 1944

In 1944, he designed a gas-operated carbine for the new 7.62×39mm cartridge. This weapon, influenced by the Garand rifle design, lost out to the new Simonov carbine which would eventually be adopted as the SKS; but it became a basis for his entry in an assault rifle competition in 1946. His winning entry, with the designer recorded by the alias "Mikhtim" (so named by taking the first letters of his name and patronymic, Mikhail Timofeyevich) became the prototype for the development of a family of prototype rifles.

This process culminated in 1947, when he designed the AK-47 (standing for Avtomat Kalashnikova model 1947). In 1949, the AK became the standard issue assault rifle of the Soviet Army and went on to become Kalashnikov's most famous invention.

While developing his first assault rifles, Kalashnikov competed with two much more experienced weapon designers, Vasily Degtyaryov and Georgy Shpagin, who both accepted the superiority of the AK-47 design. Kalashnikov named Alexandr Zaitsev and Vladimir Deikin as his major collaborators during those years.

=== Later career ===
From 1949, Mikhail Kalashnikov lived and worked in Izhevsk, Udmurtia. He held a degree of Doctor of Technical Sciences (1971) and was a member of 16 academies.

Over the course of his career, he evolved the basic design into a weapons family. The AKM (Russian: Автомат Кала́шникова Модернизированный, lit. 'Kalashnikov modernized assault rifle'), first brought into service in 1959, was lighter and cheaper to manufacture, owing to the use of a stamped steel receiver (in place of the AK-47's milled steel receiver) and contained detail improvements such as a re-shaped stock and muzzle compensator. From the AKM, he developed a squad automatic weapon variant, known as the RPK (Russian: Ручной пулемет Кала́шникова, lit. 'Kalashnikov light machine gun').

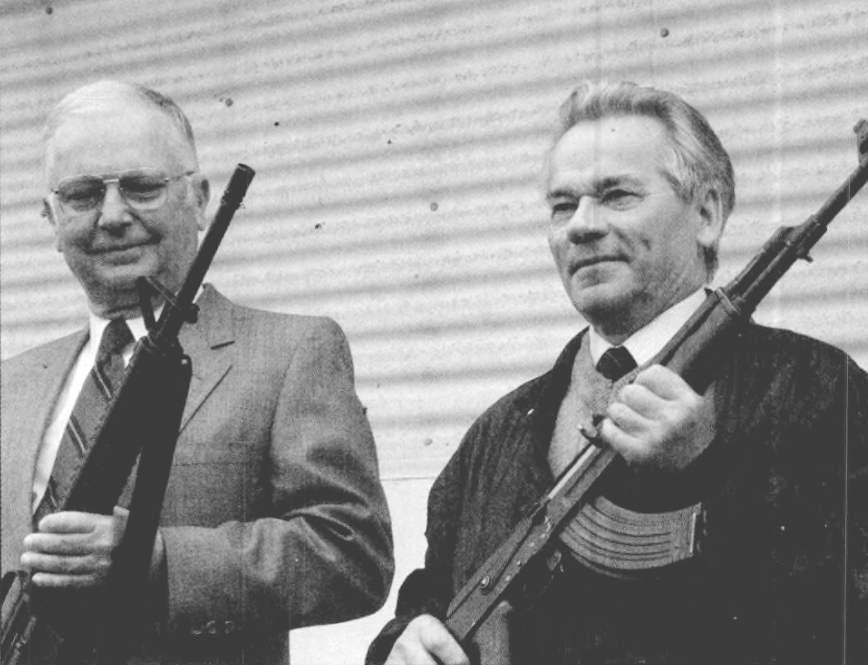
Kalashnikov (right) and Eugene Stoner (left) hold the rifles they designed, taken in May 1990.

He also developed the general-purpose PK machine gun (Russian: Пулемет Кала́шникова, lit. 'Kalashnikov machine gun'), which used the more powerful 7.62×54mmR cartridge of the Mosin–Nagant rifle. It is cartridge belt-fed, not magazine-fed, as it is intended to provide heavy sustained fire from a tripod mount, or be used as a light, bipod-mounted weapon. The common characteristics of all these weapons are their simple design, ruggedness and ease of maintenance in all operating conditions.

Approximately 100 million AK-47 assault rifles had been produced by 2009, and about half of them are counterfeit, manufactured at a rate of about a million per year. Izhmash, the official manufacturer of AK-47 in Russia, did not patent the weapon until 1997, and in 2006 accounted for only 10% of the world's production.

Kalashnikov stated that his motivation was always to serve his country, not to earn money.

During a visit to the United States in the early 2000s, Kalashnikov was invited to tour a Virginia holding site for the forthcoming Americans in Wartime Museum. Kalashnikov, a former tank commander, became visibly moved at the sight of his old tank in action, painted with his name in Cyrillic.

=== Death ===
After a prolonged illness, Kalashnikov was hospitalized on 17 November 2013, in an Udmurtian medical facility in Izhevsk, the capital of Udmurtia and where he lived. He died 23 December 2013, at age 94 from gastric hemorrhage. In January 2014, a letter that Kalashnikov wrote six months before his death to the leader of the Russian Orthodox Church, Patriarch Kirill, was published by the Russian daily newspaper Izvestia. In the letter, he stated that he was suffering "spiritual pain" about whether he was responsible for the deaths caused by the weapons he created. Translated from the published letter he states, "I keep having the same unsolved question: if my rifle claimed people's lives, then can it be that I... a Christian and an Orthodox believer, was to blame for their deaths?".

The patriarch wrote back, thanked Kalashnikov, and said that he "was an example of patriotism and a correct attitude toward the country". Kirill added about the design responsibility for the deaths by the rifle, "the church has a well-defined position when the weapon is defense of the Motherland, the Church supports its creators and the military, which use it."

He became one of the first people buried in the Federal Military Memorial Cemetery.

=== Family ===
Kalashnikov's father, Timofey Aleksandrovich Kalashnikov (1883–1930), was a peasant. He completed two grades of parochial school and could read and write. In 1901, he married Aleksandra Frolovna Kaverina (1884–1957), who was illiterate throughout her life. They had 19 children, but only eight survived to adult age; Kalashnikov was born 17th, and was close to death at age six.

In 1930, the government labeled Timofey Aleksandrovich a kulak, confiscated his property, and deported him to Siberia, along with most of the family. The eldest three siblings, daughters Agasha (b. 1905) and Anna and son Victor, were already married by 1930, and remained in Kuriya. After her husband's death in 1930, Aleksandra Frolovna married Efrem Kosach, a widower who had three children of his own.

Mikhail Kalashnikov married twice, the first time to Ekaterina Danilovna Astakhova of Altai Krai. He married the second time to Ekaterina Viktorovna Moiseyeva (1921–1977). She was an engineer and did much technical drawing work for her husband. They had four children: daughters Nelli (b. 1942), Elena (b. 1948) and Natalya (1953–1983), and a son Victor (1942–2018). Victor also became a prominent small arms designer.

Kalashnikov's grandson, Igor, ran a German company called Marken Marketing International. The company revamps trademarks and produces merchandise carrying the Kalashnikov name, such as vodka, umbrellas and knives. One of the items is a knife named for the AK-74.

The title to the AK-47 trademark belonged to Mikhail Kalashnikov's family until 4 April 2016, when the Kalashnikov Concern won a lawsuit to invalidate the registration of the trademark.

== Weapon designs ==
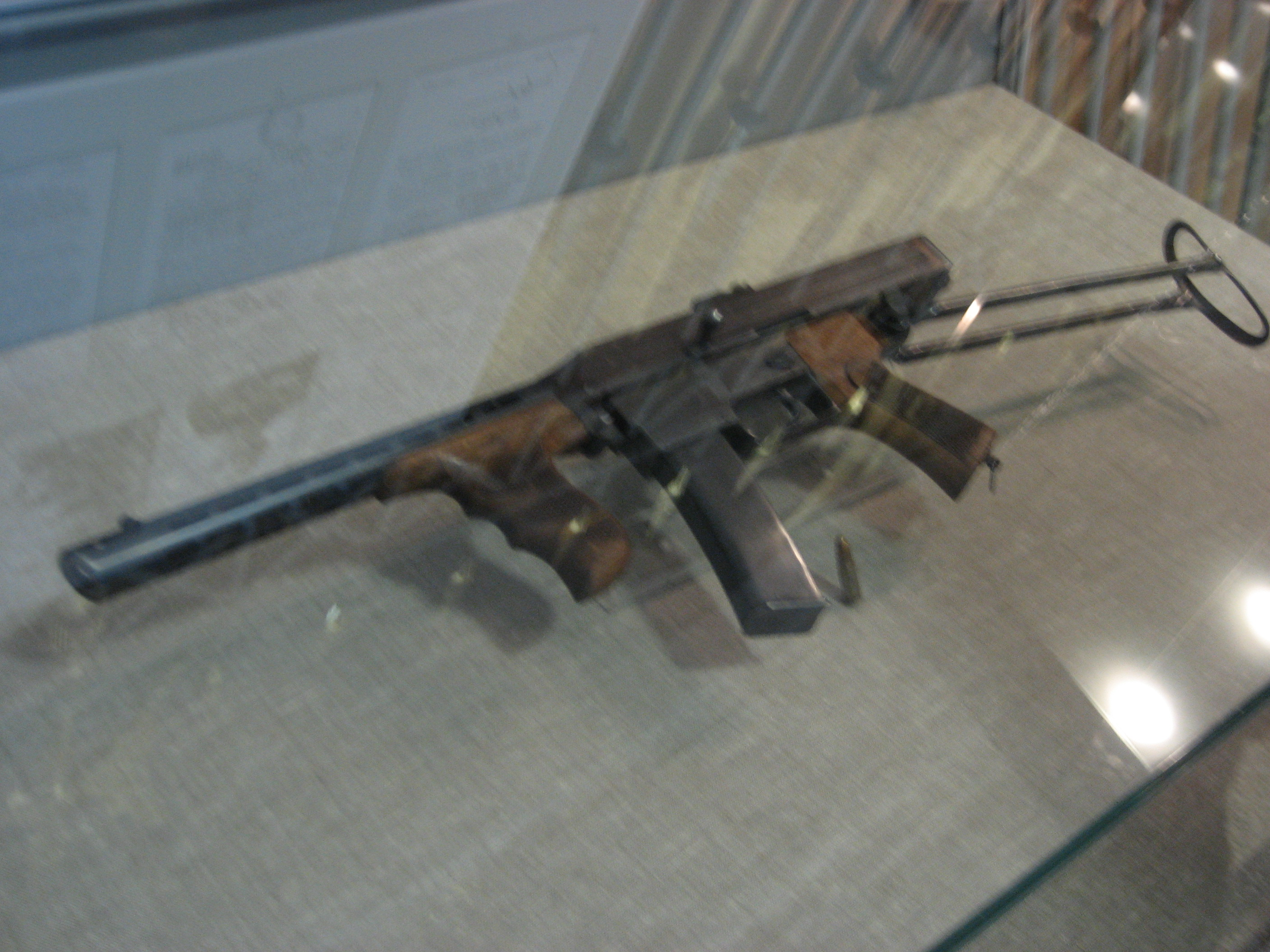
The SMG predecessor of the Kalashnikov rifle, the PPK-42

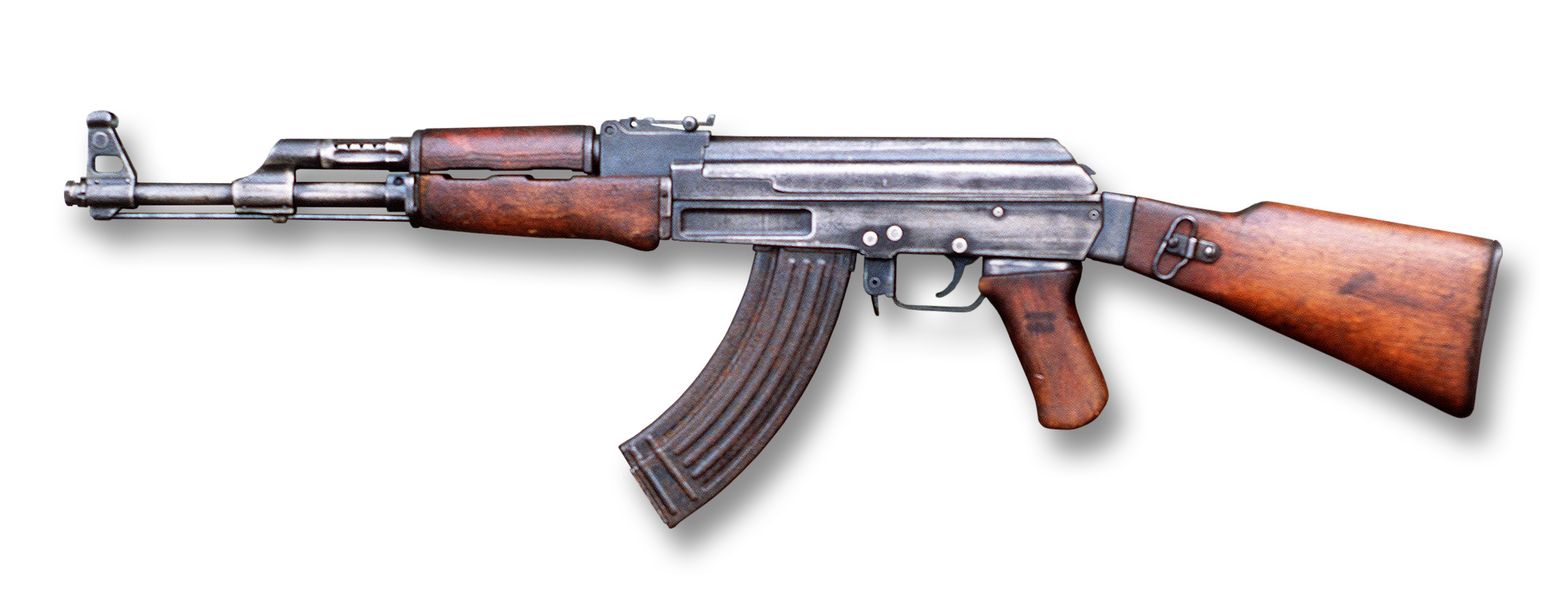
A Type 2 AK-47, the first machined receiver variation

During his career, Kalashnikov designed about 150 models of small weapons. The most famous of them are:

- AK-47
- AKM
- AK-74 / AKS-74U / AK-74M / AKS-74
- AK-101 / AK-102
- AK-103 / AK-104
- AK-105
- RPK / RPK-74
- PK / PKM / PKP
- Saiga semi-automatic rifle

== Awards and tribute ==
The Russian Medal of Small Arms Maker was introduced in 2008 and named after Kalashnikov.

- Recipient of the Order of St. Andrew
- In 1998, he was awarded an Order of Saint Andrew the Protoclete
- On his 90th birthday on 10 November 2009, Kalashnikov was named a "Hero of the Russian Federation" and presented with a medal by President Dmitry Medvedev who lauded him for creating "the brand every Russian is proud of"
- In 2012, Izhevsk State Technical University was named after Kalashnikov
- On 7 November 2014 a statue of Kalashnikov was unveiled at the Russian 102nd Military Base in Gyumri, Armenia. Armenian Defense Minister Seyran Ohanyan attended the opening ceremony.
- On 19 September 2017 a 9 metres (30 ft) monument of Kalashnikov was unveiled in Garden Ring, central Moscow. An activist who sought to disrupt the ceremony by displaying a sign reading "a creator of weapons is a creator of death" was subsequently arrested.

=== Russian Federation ===
Decorations

- Hero of the Russian Federation (2009)
- Order of St. Andrew (2008)
- Order "For Merit to the Fatherland", 2nd class (1994)
- Order of Military Merit (2004)

Awards

- State Prize of the Russian Federation in the field of design (1997)
- Award of the President of the Russian Federation in the field of education (2003)
- All-Russian Literary Prize of Suvorov (2009)
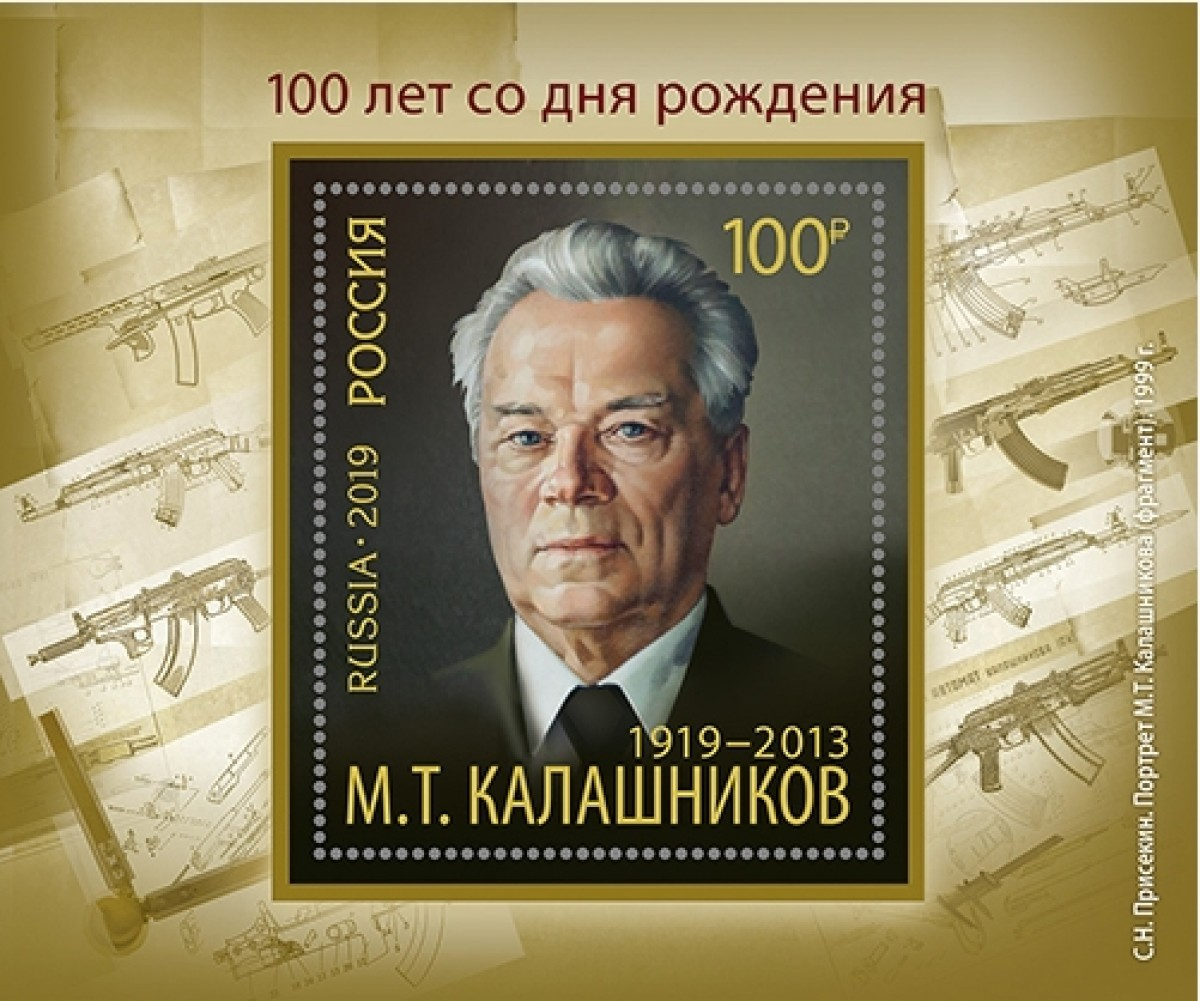
  A 2019 Russian stamp dedicated to the 100th anniversary of Kalashnikov's birth

Honorary diplomas

- Diploma of the Government of the Russian Federation (1997, 1999)

Medals

- Jubilee Medal "50 Years of Victory in the Great Patriotic War 1941–1945"
- Medal "Symbol of Science" (2007)
- Gold Medal of Zhukov
- Medal "For outstanding contribution to the development of the collection business in Russia"

Acknowledgements

- Gratitude of the President of the Russian Federation (1997, 1999, 2002, 2007)

=== Soviet ===
Honors

- Hero of Socialist Labour (1958, 1976)
- Order of Lenin (1958, 1969, 1976)
- Order of the October Revolution (1974)
- Order of the Red Star (1949)
- Order of the Patriotic War, 1st Class (1985)
- Order of the Red Banner of Labour (1957)
- Order of Friendship of Peoples (1982)

Medals

- Medal "Hammer and Sickle" (1958,1976)
- Medal "For Victory over Germany in the Great Patriotic War of 1941–1945"
- Medal "Twenty Years of Victory in the Great Patriotic War 1941–1945"
- Medal "In commemoration of the 100th anniversary of the birth of Vladimir Ilyich Lenin"
- Jubilee Medal "Thirty Years of Victory in the Great Patriotic War 1941–1945"
- Jubilee Medal "Forty Years of Victory in the Great Patriotic War 1941–1945"
- Medal "For Distinction in Guarding the State Border of the USSR"
- Medal "Veteran of Labor" on behalf of the Presidium of the Supreme Soviet of the USSR
- Jubilee Medal "30 years of the Soviet Army and Navy"
- Jubilee Medal "40 years of the Armed Forces of the USSR"
- Jubilee Medal "50 Years of the Armed Forces of the USSR"
- Jubilee Medal "60 Years of the Armed Forces of the USSR"
- Jubilee Medal "70 years of the Armed Forces of the USSR"
- Medal "In Commemoration of the 800th anniversary of Moscow"

Awards

- Stalin Prize (1949)
- Lenin Prize (1964)

=== Foreign decorations ===
- (Belarus) Order of Honor (1999)
- (Kazakhstan) Order of Friendship, First Class (2003)

=== Other honors ===
- the home of Mikhail Kalashnikov in the village he set Courier lifetime bronze bust (1980)
- the name of the designer named projected prospect in Izhevsk (1994)
- "Honorary Citizen of the Altai Territory" (1997)
- Ministry of Economy of Russia award – The sign "of small arms designer Mikhail Kalashnikov" (1997)
- Union of scientific and engineering organizations and the Government of Udmurtia established an award named after Mikhail Kalashnikov (1999)
- Diamond company "Alrosa" extracted 29 December 1995 gem diamonds weighing 50.74 carats given the name "designer Mikhail Kalashnikov" (14.5 x 15, 0h15, 5 mm, quality Stones Black) (1999)
- Mikhail Kalashnikov Cadet School in Votkinsk (2002)
- Award in his name at the School of Weapon Skills of Izhevsk (2002)
- Izhevsk State Cultural Institution "Museum of Mikhail Kalashnikov"
- "Honorary Engineer of Kazakhstan" (Kazakhstan; 2004)
- Gift from President Hugo Chávez, the highest award of the Republic – a copy of the famous sword of Simon Bolivar, which is a relic of Venezuela and the copy is equal to the highest award of the country (2009)
- The name of Mikhail Kalashnikov was given to the military department of the Mining Institute in St. Petersburg (2009)
- Izhevsk State Technical University was awarded the name of Mikhail Kalashnikov (2012)
- German knife company Boker has dedicated a series to him (2013)
- The companies that make Kalashnikov rifles, Izhmash and Izhevsk Mechanical Plant were merged and formally renamed Kalashnikov Concern. (2013)

== See also ==
- List of Heroes of the Russian Federation
