= Gwyneth Cravens =

American writer

Gwyneth Cravens (born c. 1945) is an American novelist and journalist. She has published five novels. Her fiction and nonfiction have appeared in The New Yorker, where she also worked as a fiction editor, and in Harper's Magazine, where she was an associate editor. She has contributed articles and editorials on science and other topics to Harper's Magazine, The New York Times, and The Washington Post.

At a September 2007 seminar given by the Long Now Foundation, Cravens outlined the message of her book, Power to Save the World: The Truth About Nuclear Energy. Released in October 2007, it argued for nuclear power as a safe energy source and an essential preventive of global warming. She appeared in the documentary Pandora's Promise to speak about the merits of nuclear power.

Since then, she has given presentations to members of the technical and academic communities around the U.S., including the Brookings Institution, the Progressive Policy Institute, the University of Hartford, and Sandia National Laboratories. She has often shared the podium with Dr. D. Richard ("Rip") Anderson, a chemist, oceanographer, and international expert in nuclear risk assessment.

Cravens has contributed articles on nuclear power as a low-carbon alternative energy source to The Huffington Post and Discover. In 2002, she wrote "Terrorism and Nuclear Energy: Understanding the Risks" for The Brookings Review.

== Personal life ==
Gwyneth Cravens was born in 1944 in Mitchell, South Dakota. In an interview, she says that she "grew up in an anti-nuke family. My parents were anti-nuclear."

Cravens has a daughter, the artist Astrid Cravens (born 1967).

In 1974, she started dating Henry Beard, one of the founders of the magazine National Lampoon and the author of several best-selling books. While there is some question if they ever married or not, they have continued as a couple. In 1991, an article said that Beard and Cravens divided their time between Manhattan and a renovated boat shed in East Hampton and referred to them as partners. A 2006 interview in a different publication said that Beard and Cravens had married.

In May 2022, it was reported that Cravens, suffering from Alzheimer's disease, went missing for a brief period, but was later located.

== Bibliography ==
- The Black Death (1977), cinematised in 1992 as Quiet Killer.
- Speed of Light (1980)
- Love and Work (1982)
- Heart's Desire (1986)
- Gates of Paradise (1990)
- Power to Save the World: The Truth about Nuclear Energy (2007) ISBN 978-0-307-26656-9

== Filmography ==
- Pandora's Promise (2013)
