= William J. Ruane =

American businessman, investor and philanthropist

- Born: October 24, 1925; Chicago, Illinois, U.S.
- Died: October 4, 2005 (aged 79); New York City, U.S.
- Education: University of Minnesota (BS); Harvard University (MBA)
- Occupation: Investment management
- Employer: Ruane, Cunniff, and Goldfarb
- Known for: Manager of Sequoia Fund

William J. Ruane (October 24, 1925 – October 4, 2005) was an American businessman, investor, and philanthropist.

Ruane graduated from the University of Minnesota in 1945 with a degree in electrical engineering and from Harvard Business School in 1949. He enlisted in the U.S. Navy and was on his way to Japan when World War II ended. He met Warren Buffett at an investment seminar with value investing guru Benjamin Graham and he and Buffett became lifelong friends. They both worked as assistants to Graham at Columbia University When Buffett closed his investment group in 1969, he advised associates to consider investing with Ruane as they both employed Graham's value investing techniques.

Ruane founded his own investment firm, Ruane Cunniff, with partner Rick Cunniff in 1970, and the same year they launched their flagship Sequoia Fund. Ruane's firm was renamed Ruane, Cunniff, and Goldfarb in 2004, when Robert Goldfarb became president. In 2008, the Sequoia Fund announced it would open its fund to new investors for the first time since 1982.

In 1992 he adopted a block in the Harlem neighborhood of New York City, committed to make it a better place, renovating buildings and establishing clinics and community service programs. Ruane gave every child on the block a scholarship to a Catholic school. He also funded programs at public schools and schools on Indian reservations, and contributed to mental health causes.

== Death ==
He died at Memorial Sloan-Kettering Cancer Center in Manhattan, aged 79, of lung cancer.

== Personal life ==
William J. Ruane resided in Manhattan and Washington, Connecticut. He was married twice. His first wife predeceased him. His second wife, to whom he was married at the time of his death, was Joy. He had four offspring: his sons were William Jr., who lived in Cambridge, Massachusetts, and Thomas, of Washington, Connecticut.; his daughters were Elizabeth "Lili" Ruane, of Burlington, Vermont, and Paige Ruane, of New York City; he had a sibling, Patricia Lowry, of Kihei, Maui, Hawaii.

== See also ==
- Warren Buffett
- David Dodd
- Irving Kahn
