= Nicholas Kalashnikoff =

Siberian-American author

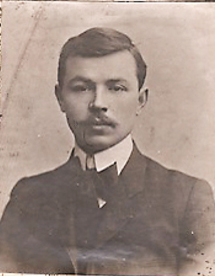
Nicholas Kalashnikoff

Nicholas Kalashnikoff (May 17, 1888 – August 17, 1961) was a Siberian-American author who wrote in the 1930s to 1950s. Before moving to the United States in 1924, Kalashnikoff participated in the 1905 Russian Revolution and was a political exile during the rest of the 1900s. With the military, Kalashnikoff served as a captain during World War I and a general in the Russian Civil War. After arriving in the United States, Kalashnikoff published his 1939 autobiography They That Take the Sword and received two fellowships from MacDowell by 1941.

Following his expansion into children's books in 1944, Kalashnikoff was an author until the early 1950s. He used his past to create Jumper: The Life of a Siberian Horse and My Friend Yakub. In fictional works, Kalashnikoff wrote about a mythical legend from the Yakut with Toyon: A Dog of the North and His People. His book about a fictional Lamut shepherd, The Defenders, received a Newbery Honor in 1952.

== Early life and education ==
On May 17, 1888, Kalashnikoff was born in Minusinsk, Siberia. During the 1900s, Kalashnikoff studied philosophy and history at Moscow University before joining the 1905 Russian Revolution.

== Career ==
After living in Siberia as a political exile from 1905 to 1909, Kalashnikoff was an Army captain for Russia during World War I and a Siberian general throughout the Russian Civil War. During the 1920s, Kalashnikoff lived in China due to war before moving to the United States in 1924. In 1939, Kalashnikoff became a writer with his autobiography They That Take the Sword. By 1941, Kalashnikoff had received two fellowships from MacDowell.

In 1944, Kalashnikoff wrote a children's book titled Jumper: The Life of a Siberian Horse. Kalashnikoff's book was about a warhorse that he had previously owned. With Toyon: A Dog of the North and His People, Kalashnikoff retold a mythical legend from the Yakuts in his 1950 book. In The Defender, Kalashnikoff wrote about a Lamut shepherd for his book in 1952. That year, The Defender was named a Newbery Honor. Kalashnikoff used his childhood as a basis for the 1953 book My Friend Yakub.

== Personal life ==
On August 17, 1961, Kalashnikoff died in New York from cardiovascular disease. He was married and had no children.

- * Кан Г. С. Грозя бедой преступной силе… Летучий боевой отряд Северной области (1906-1908). Т.I-II» (СПб., 2021) ISBN 978-5-87991-153-4
