= Izhevsk State Technical University =

Public university in Izhevsk, Russia

- Ижевский государственный технический университет
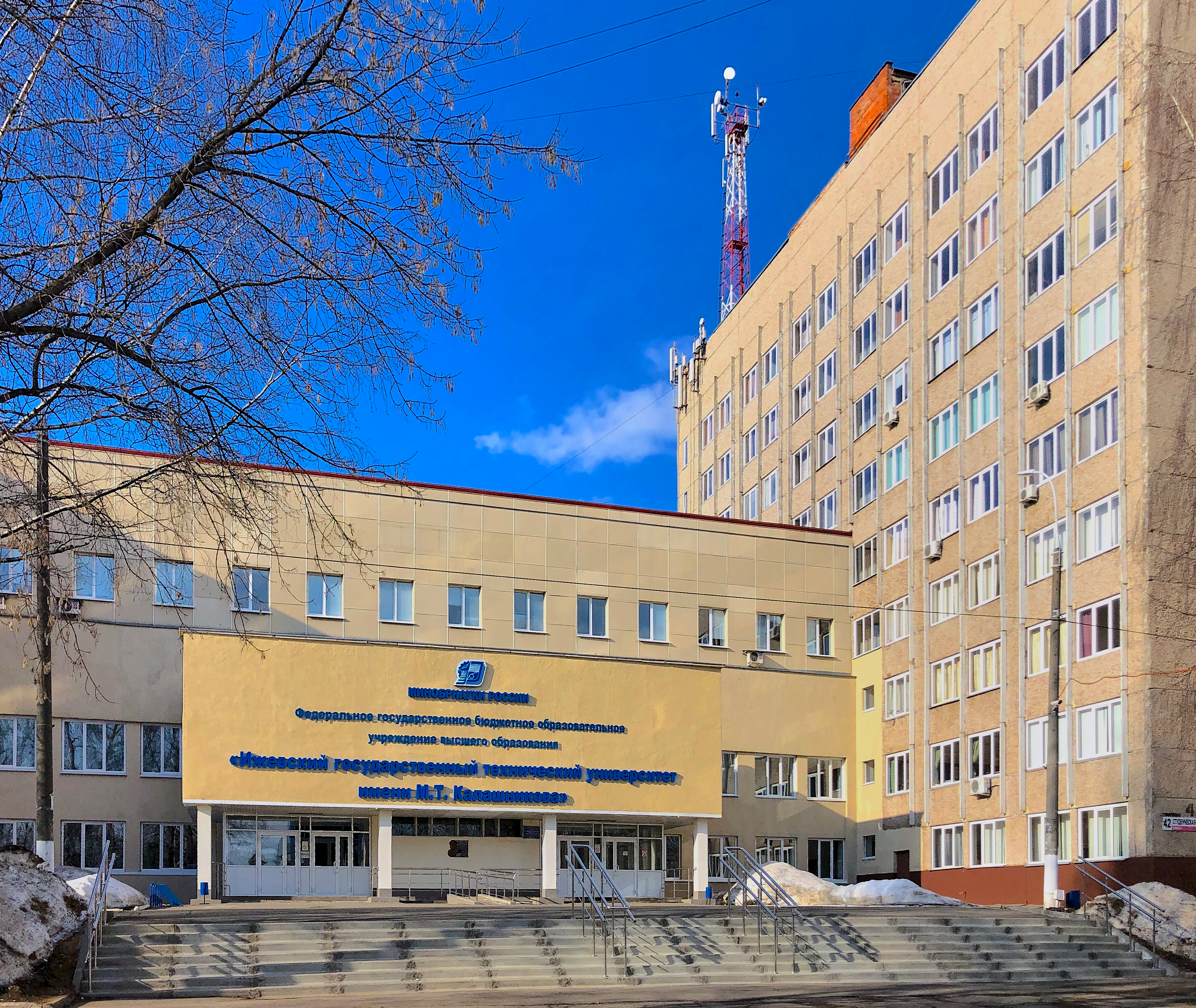
- Type: Public
- Established: 22 Februay 1952
- Location: Izhevsk, Russia; 56°52′21″N 53°10′36″E
- Campus: Urban
- Nickname: IzhGTU (Russian: ИжГТУ)
- Website: www.istu.ru

Kalashnikov Izhevsk State Technical University (Russian: Ижевский государственный технический университет имени М. Т. Калашникова) is a higher education institution in Izhevsk, Republic of Udmurtia, Russia.

== History ==
The Izhevsk Mechanical Institute of the Ministry of Higher Education of the Soviet Union was established by Resolution No. 1034 of the Council of Ministers of the Soviet Union on February 22, 1952, supplemented by Order No. 370 of the Minister of Higher Education of the USSR on March 4, 1952 as a higher educational institution of the Ministry of Higher Education to provide qualified engineering personnel for the industry of the USSR, the city of Izhevsk, and the Udmurt ASSR.

The first student intake, in September 1952, consisted of 200 students. Gradually, the list of faculties and specialties expanded, and branches were opened in cities throughout the republic and the region (Votkinsk, Sarapul, Glazov, Tchaikovsky and Kambarka).

On 22 December 1993 in accordance with a decree of the State Committee for Higher Education, the institute was renamed as Izhevsk State Technical University.
