= Ruane, Cunniff & Goldfarb =

Investment firm

Ruane Cunniff LP
- Type: Private company
- Industry: Investment Management
- Founded: 1969
- Headquarters: New York City
- Products: Mutual fund, Hedge funds, Separately managed accounts
- AUM: $6.73 billion (7 November 2022)
- Number of employees: 66
- Website: www.ruanecunniff.com

Ruane Cunniff LP, based in New York City, is the investment firm founded in 1969 by William J. Ruane, Richard T. Cunniff and Robert Goldfarb.

Ruane Cunniff LP is best known as the investment advisor and distributor of the Sequoia Fund (SEQUX). For a long time after its inception in 1970 the Sequoia Fund recorded one of the best long-term track records on Wall Street.

Ruane Cunniff LP manages $19 billion in assets across the Sequoia Fund, hedge fund partnerships (Acacia Partners and Wishbone Partners), and separately managed accounts.

== Management ==
Robert Goldfarb retired at the end of 2016, following Sequoia Fund's significant losses that year. David Poppe succeeded Goldfarb as CEO. Poppe retired in 2018. Since then, a four-person investment committee has managed the Sequoia Fund.

== Sequoia Fund ==
The history of the Sequoia Fund traces its roots to Bill Ruane's lifelong friendship with Warren Buffett. Bill Ruane first met Buffett at a value investing seminar taught by Benjamin Graham at Columbia University in 1950. When Buffett closed his investment partnership in 1969, he advised his clients to invest with Ruane in the Sequoia Fund. In 1970, William J. Ruane and Richard T. Cunniff founded the Sequoia Fund to take on Buffett's former investors. Robert Goldfarb joined the firm in 1971.

In The Superinvestors of Graham-and-Doddsville, Buffett wrote, "When I wound up the Buffett Partnership, I asked Bill Ruane if he would set up a fund to handle all of our partners, so he set up the Sequoia Fund. Bill was the only person I recommended to my partners." During his search for a candidate to succeed him as chief investment officer of Berkshire Hathaway, Buffett said, "I'm looking for another Bill Ruane."

In the 45-year period from its inception in 1970 to 2015, the Sequoia Fund earned an annualized return of 14.65% versus the S&P 500's annualized return of 10.93%. According to Morningstar, Sequoia Fund outperformed its large-cap blend-category peers in 332 of the 333 rolling 10-year periods dating back to its 1970 start. The fund closed to new investment in 1982 and reopened 26 years later in 2008. In 2010, Morningstar named co-managers Robert Goldfarb and David M. Poppe Domestic-Stock Fund Managers of the Year in recognition of the excellent long-term performance of the Sequoia Fund. In 2013, the Sequoia Fund again closed to new investors. In April 2016 and after a sharp loss on Valeant Pharmaceuticals, the Fund indicated it was reopening to new investors.

In 2016, the fund lost $1.26 billion in a single day when Valeant Pharmaceuticals stock, which made up 19% of Sequoia Fund holdings, lost a significant portion of its value. Goldfarb and Poppe responded by saying that their "credibility as investors has been damaged by this saga." The Valeant Pharmaceuticals position accounted for over 30% of Sequoia Fund's assets in mid-2015, and declined 87% from a high of $265.52 in August 2015 to $33.43 in March 2016. Over this time period Sequoia fell by 22%, performing worse than 99% of rival funds. At one point, over 30 percent of the fund's assets were invested in Valeant.
