= RPG-22 =

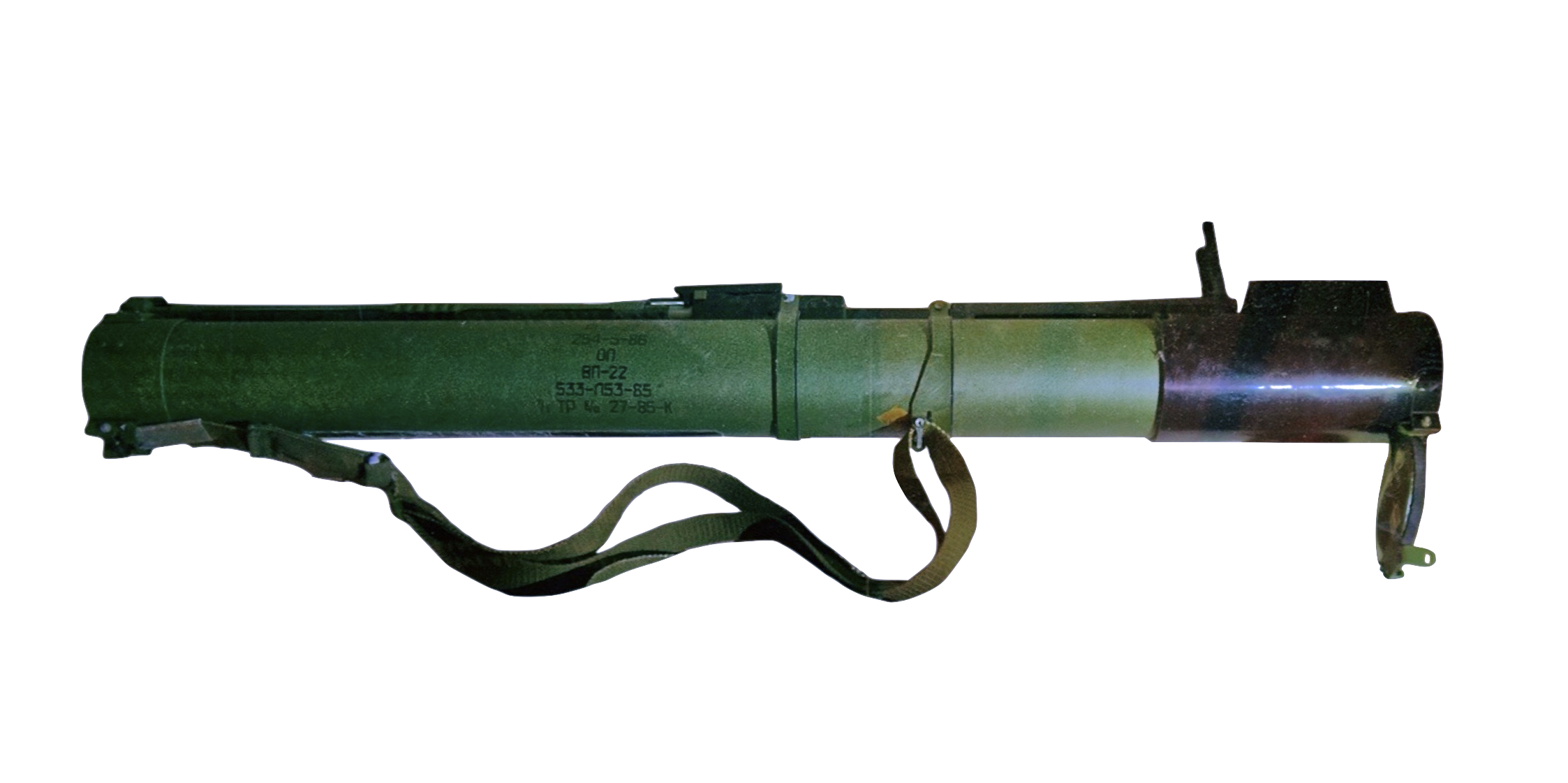
- RPG-22 launcher
- Type: Disposable Rocket-propelled grenade
- Place of origin: Soviet Union

Service history
- In service: 1985–present
- Used by: See Operators
- Wars: Soviet–Afghan War; Russo-Georgian War; Iraq War; Syrian Civil War; War in Iraq (2013–2017); Russo-Ukrainian War

Specifications
- Mass: 2.8 kg (loaded)
- Length: 785 mm (unarmed); 850 mm (ready to fire)
- Shell: HEAT
- Caliber: 72.5 mm
- Action: 400 mm: RHA; 1000 mm: Concrete; 1200 mm: Brick
- Muzzle velocity: 133 m/s
- Effective firing range: 150–200 m
- Maximum firing range: 250 m

The Soviet RPG-22 Netto is a one-shot disposable anti-tank rocket launcher first deployed in 1985, based on the RPG-18 rocket launcher, but firing a larger 72.5 mm fin stabilised projectile.

== Operation ==
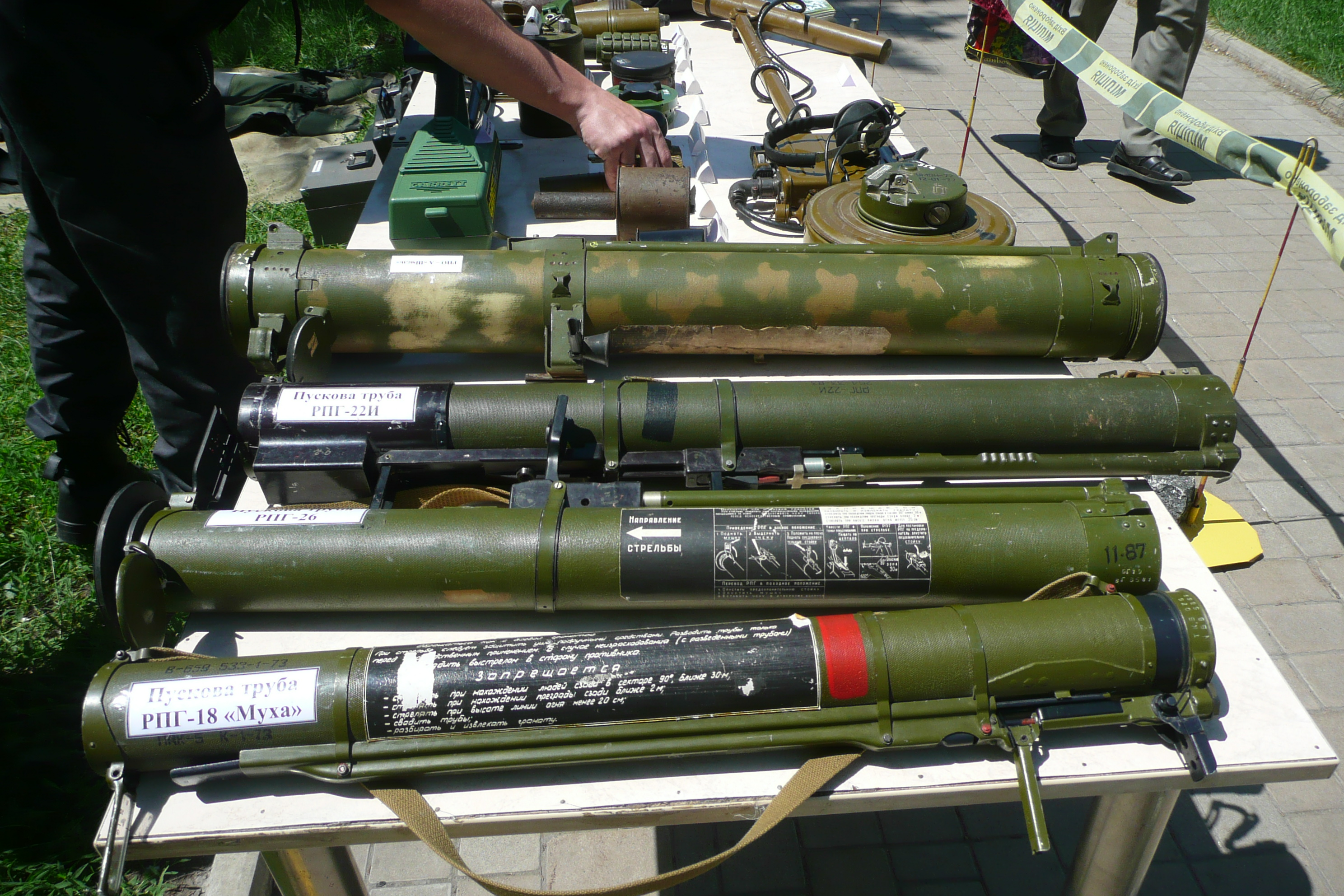
RPG-22 (third from the bottom) with comparable Soviet/Russian rocket launchers

The weapon fires an unguided projectile, can be prepared to fire in around 10 seconds, and can penetrate 400 mm of armour, 1.2 metres of brick or 1 metre of reinforced concrete.

The smoothbore container is made from two fibreglass parts; a main tube containing the rocket, and a telescoping forward extension, which slides over the barrel.

In transport mode, both ends of the barrel are closed by plastic covers, which open when the weapon is extended. The firing mechanism is manually cocked by raising the rear sight. Lowering the rear sight de-cocks the weapon if there is no target.

On firing, there is a backblast danger area behind the weapon, of at least 15 metres. The solid propellant motor completely burns out while the rocket is still in the barrel tube, accelerating it to about 133 metres per second. The weapon has simple pop-up sights graduated to ranges of 50, 150 and 250 metres.

To keep training costs down, a reusable RPG-22 is available that fires a 30 mm subcalibre projectile, weighing 350g, to operational ranges. Handling is identical to that of the full calibre version, with the exception of the discharge noise and backblast.

== Usage ==
=== Real IRA ===
On the evening of 20 September 2000, dissident Irish Republican group the Real IRA attacked the MI6 Building in London (the headquarters of the British Secret Intelligence Service) with a single RPG-22 round, causing superficial damage.

The rocket used in London was made in Russia; a rocket found in a Real IRA cache near Dungannon came from Bulgaria. A weapons cache destined for the Real IRA, seized in Croatia in August 2000, contained a number of RPG-22s. Prices range from £150 to £220 per launcher.

== Operators ==
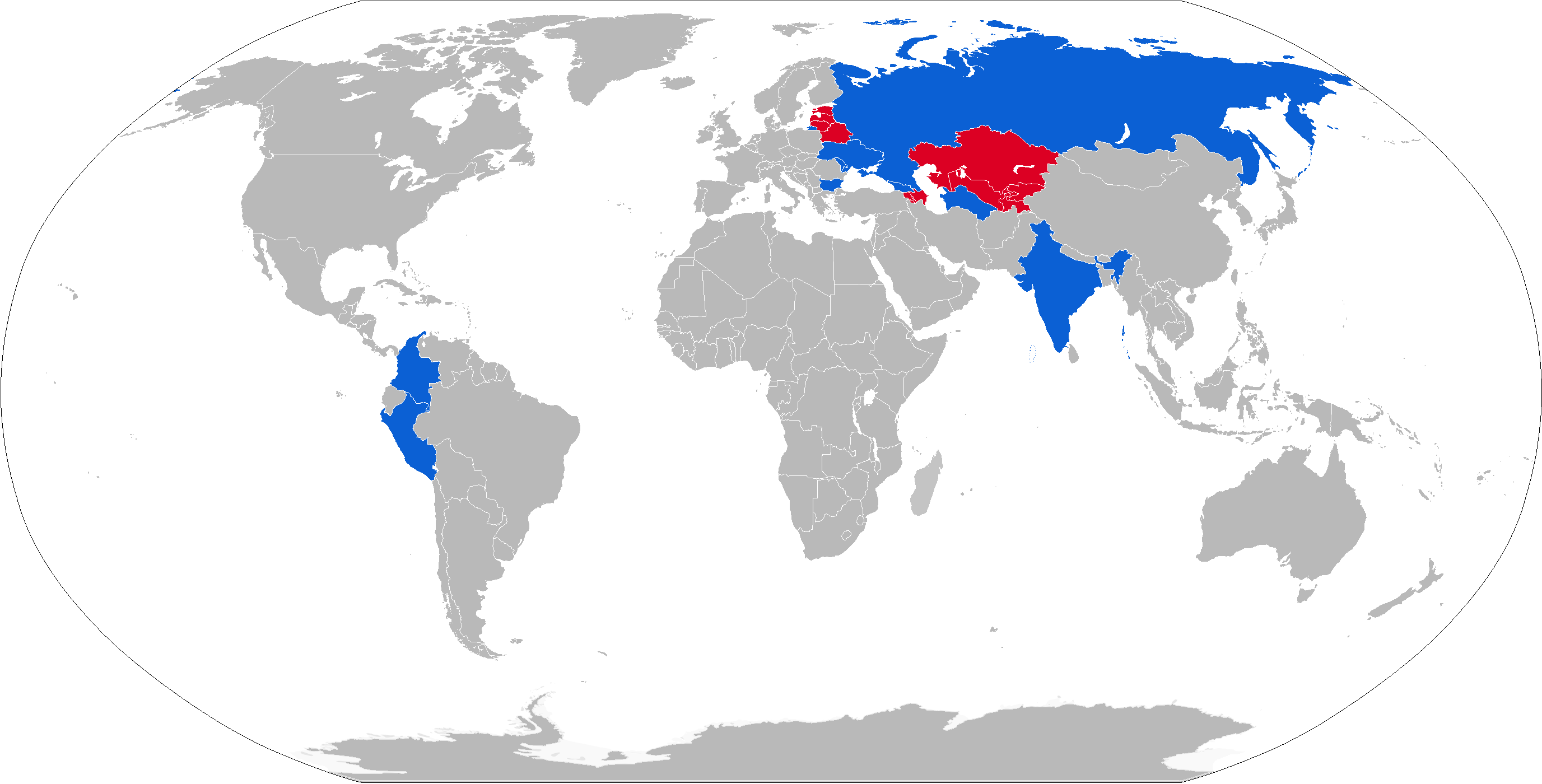
Operators: Current Former

=== Current operators ===
- Bulgaria
  - Bulgarian Land Forces
    - Local production at VMZ Sopot, also a variant: Bulspike.
- Colombia
  - Colombian National Army
- Croatia
  - Croatian Army
- Georgia
  - Georgian Land Forces
- India
  - Indian Army
- Iraq
  - Iraqi insurgents
- Moldova
  - Moldovan Ground Forces
- Peru
  - Peruvian Army
- Russia
  - Russian Ground Forces
- Syria
- Transnistria
- Turkmenistan
  - Turkmenistan Ground Forces
- Ukraine
  - Ukrainian Ground Forces
  - Ukrainian National Guard

=== Former operators ===
- Soviet Union
  - Passed on to successor states
- Real Irish Republican Army

== See also ==
- M72 LAW – (United States)
- M80 Zolja – (Socialist Federal Republic of Yugoslavia)
- PF-89 – (China)
- Kestrel – (Taiwan)

== Reference in print ==
- Jones, Richard. Jane's Infantry Weapons 2005–06. Coulsdon: Jane's, 2005. ISBN 0-7106-2694-0.
