= Kestrel (rocket launcher) =

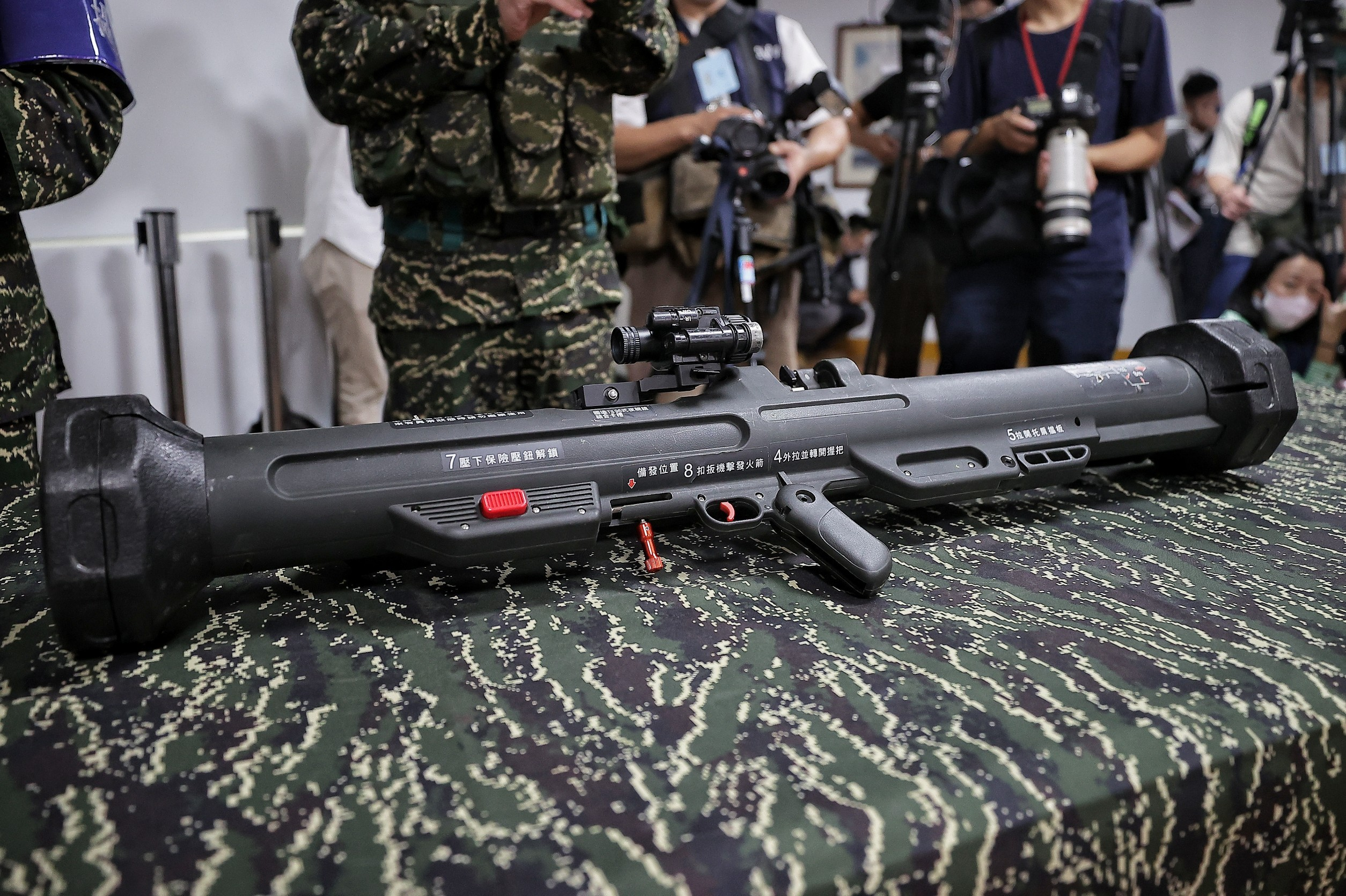
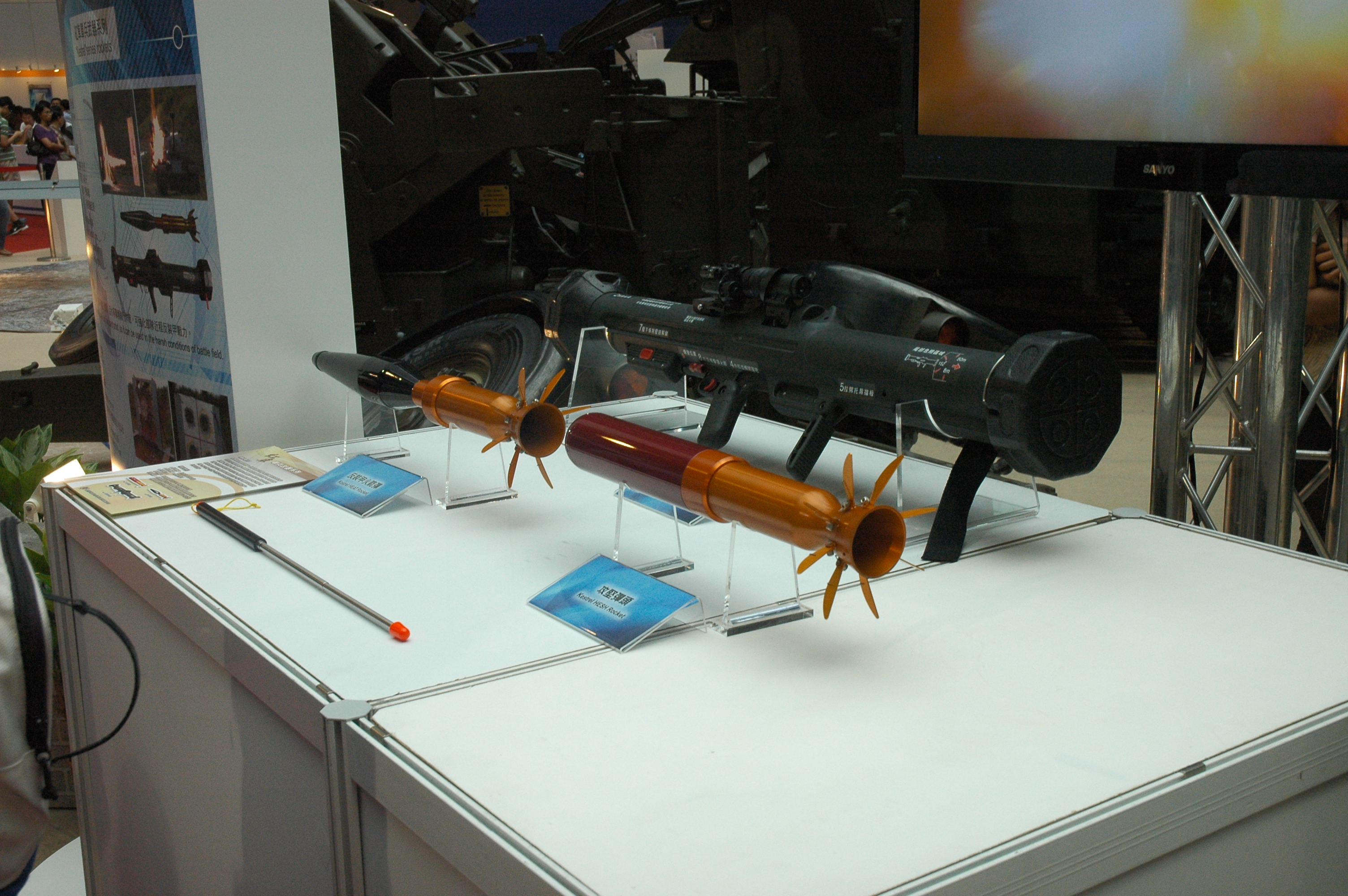
- Kestrel system
- Type: Anti-tank weapon
- Place of origin: Taiwan

Service history
- In service: 2015–present
- Used by: See operators

Production history
- Designer: National Chung-Shan Institute of Science and Technology
- Designed: 2008-2012
- Manufacturer: National Chung-Shan Institute of Science and Technology
- Unit cost: US$3,100
- Produced: 2015-present
- No. built: 33,000+

Specifications
- Mass: 5 kg
- Length: 110 cm
- Crew: 1
- Caliber: 67 mm
- Effective firing range: 400 m (HEAT) or 150 m (HESH)
- Sights: Iron sights and modular optics

The Kestrel (Chinese: 紅隼反裝甲火箭) is an individual shoulder-launched weapon system developed by Taiwan's National Chung-Shan Institute of Science and Technology.

== Development ==
Development of the Kestrel began in 2008 following a request from the Republic of China Marine Corps. Eleven tests were carried out between 2009 and 2012 and the Initial Operational Test and Evaluation occurred in 2013. The Kestrel was first exhibited at the Taipei Aerospace & Defense Technology Exhibition in 2013.

== Design ==
The Kestrel launcher is made from fiber reinforced plastic (FRP) and features an optical sight as well as a mount for a night vision scope. Its effective range is 400m with HEAT warhead rocket and 150m with HESH warhead rocket.

=== Rockets ===
==== HEAT ====
The standard rocket features a high explosive anti-tank warhead. The HEAT rocket has a 400m range and can penetrate 35 centimeters of armor.

==== HESH ====
The development of a High Explosive Squash Head warhead began in 2012. It has been tested against brick walls and reinforced concrete. This warhead is particularly effective for making mouseholes (improvised doorways) in concrete walls during urban combat. The HESH rocket has a range of 150 meters and can penetrate 20-60 centimeters of reinforced concrete.

==== Long range ====
A long range rocket that can reach out to 1,200m is in development.

==== Guided ====
A guided missile based on existing Kestrel rockets is under development by NCSIST with an eye to providing a domestic equivalent to the FGM-148 Javelin.

== Variant ==
=== Kestrel II ===
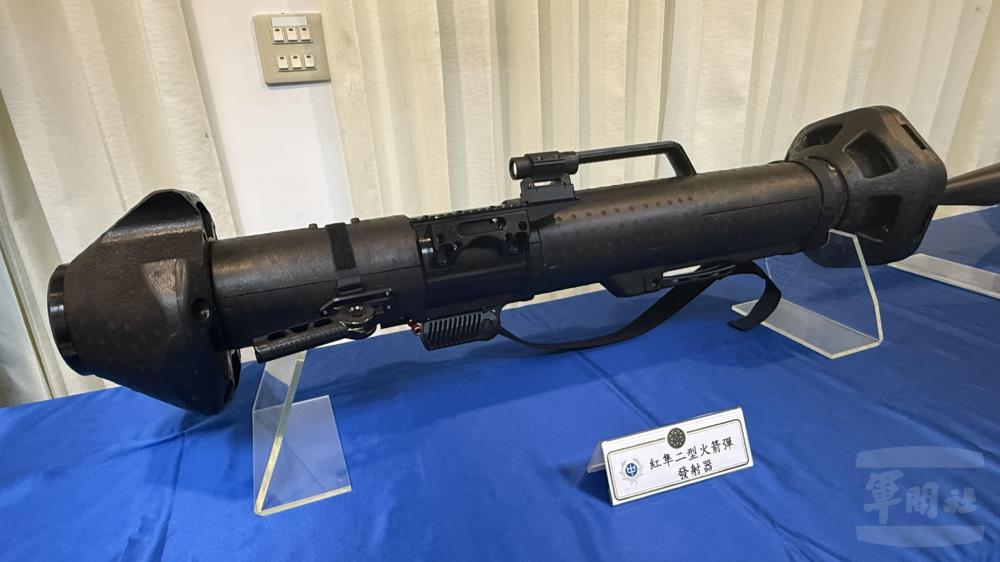
Kestrel Ⅱ

In 2026, NCSIST announced its new-generation Kestrel rocket launcher called the "Kestrel II" (Chinese: 紅隼二型). It is heavier since the caliber have been increased from 66mm to 96mm. Hence, the range have been increased to 500 meters while the projectile can penetrate 67cm of armor. The testing phase will finish by the end of 2026.

== Service history ==
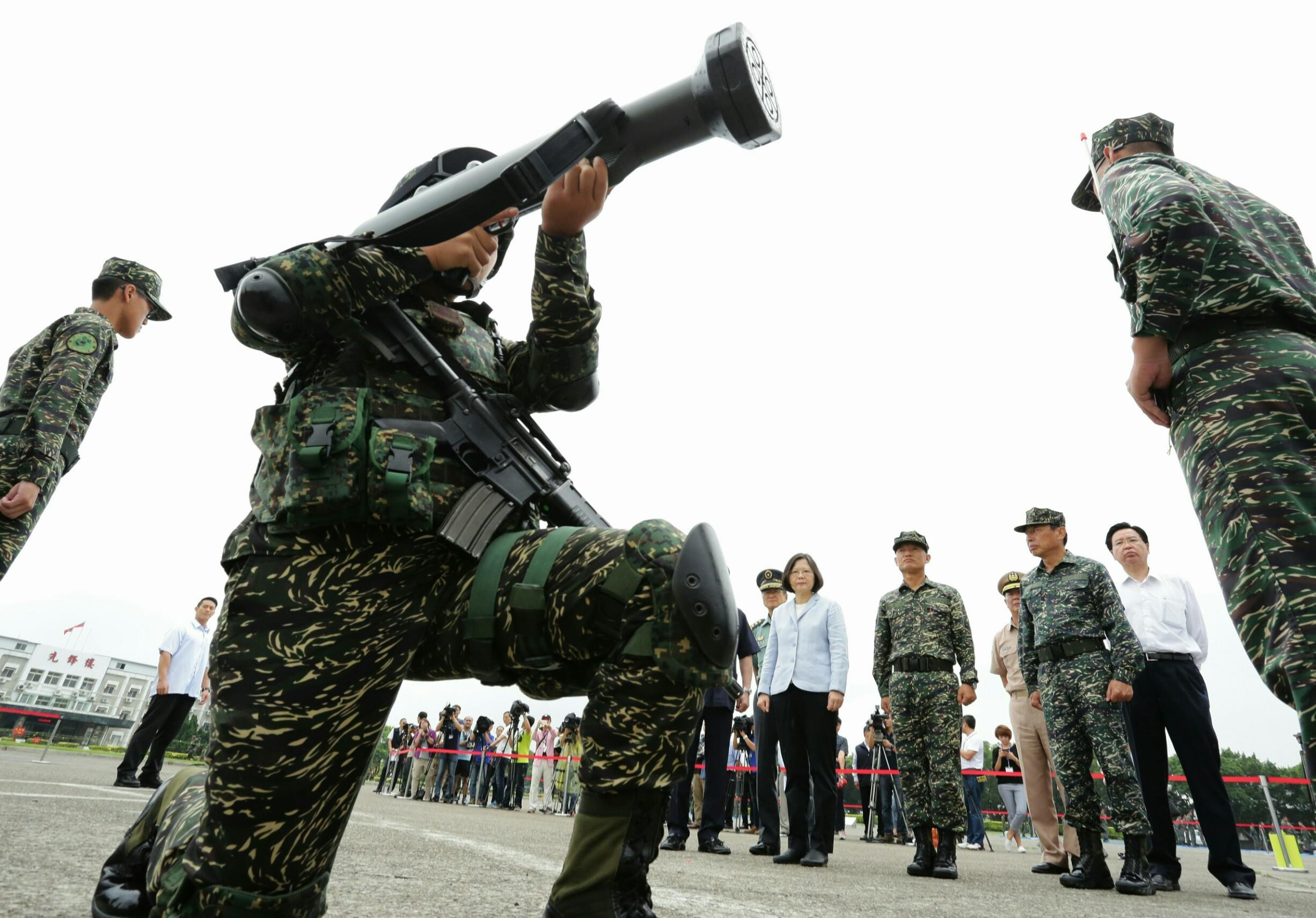
Kestrel system demonstrated for Taiwanese President Tsai Ing-wen

=== Republic of China Military Police ===
The Kestrel entered service with the ROCMC in 2015. In 2018 the Republic of China Military Police placed an order for 445 launchers. As of December 2019 the ROCMP had procured 397 combat systems, 238 test systems and five training simulators.

=== Coast Guard Administration ===
In 2019 the Coast Guard Administration placed an order for 84 launchers and 88 simulators. By April 2021 many had been deployed to units garrisoned on islands in the South China Sea.

=== Republic of China Army ===
The Republic of China Army has evaluated the system to replace their numerous M72 LAW systems. In 2022, the Army placed an order for 5,000 launchers. In 2023 the Army placed an order for 5,962 additional launchers.

== Operators ==
(Taiwan) Republic of China Army

- September 2022, 5,000 missiles ordered
- August 2023, 5,962 Kestrel ordered

== See also ==
- List of rocket launchers
- List of anti-tank missiles
- NCSIST 2.75in rockets remote weapon station
- AT4 – Sweden
- APILAS – France
- Mk 153 SMAW – United States
- RPG-22 – Soviet Union
- PF-89 – China
- DZJ-08 – China
- Panzerfaust 3 – West Germany
