= RPG-76 Komar =

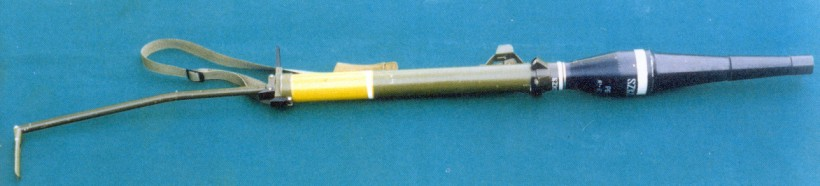
- An extended RPG-76 Komar
- Type: Rocket-propelled grenade
- Place of origin: Poland

Service history
- In service: 1985–present
- Used by: See § Users
- Wars: War in Afghanistan (2001–2021); Iraq War; Russian invasion of Ukraine

Production history
- Designed: 1973
- Manufacturer: Precision Works in Niewiadów (Zakład Sprzętu Precyzyjnego w Niewiadowie)
- Produced: 1980 prototypes, 1983-95
- No. built: Over 100,000

Specifications
- Mass: 2.1 kg - loaded launcher with rocket 1.7 kg - rocket
- Length: 805 mm - folded 1190 mm extended
- Crew: 1
- Cartridge: 68 mm with 260 mm penetration against RHA
- Caliber: 40 mm (1.57 in)
- Barrels: one
- Action: Single shot
- Muzzle velocity: 145 m/s
- Effective firing range: 250 m
- Feed system: Single shot, non reusable launch tube
- Sights: Iron sights

RPG-76 (Polish: Komar, lit. 'Mosquito') is a disposable one-shot anti-tank rocket-propelled grenade that fires an unguided rocket.

== History ==
In 1971, the Polish Military Institute of Defense Technology initiated the project “Argon,” aimed at developing an anti-tank launcher with a single-use launch tube as a supplement for the RPG-7. Two versions were considered: a recoilless rifle and a rocket-propelled grenade launcher.

Because of earlier experience gained during the development of the rocket-assisted PGN-60 rifle grenade used by the Kbkg wz. 1960 rifle grenade launcher, the project eventually settled on the rocket-propelled grenade design. At this stage, the Polish design team (Z. Zborowski, K. Kowalewski, T. Witczak, Z. Kapustka, A. Perełkowicz, K. Laskowski, Z.Kupidura) was supplemented by a team of Bulgarian scientists from the Military Institute of Research and Development in Sofia, whose task was to develop the rocket engine and the launcher.

The prototype was presented in 1973, at the III Central Military Invention and Rationalization Exhibition. At the time, the weapon was designated “HEAT grenade with single use launch tube RPG-73.” A series of prototype launchers was produced in 1980. In the following years, the Polish-Bulgarian cooperation broke down and the development of the launcher continued in Poland only.

== Design ==
The weapon was designed as a smaller and lighter alternative to the RPG-7, especially for use by airborne troops. Thanks to jet nozzles located between the warhead and the fuel compartment, it can be fired from inside a building or a vehicle.

The weapon is shipped in wooden crates, each launcher is sealed in an airtight plastic sheet and 6 launchers are placed in each crate.

Komar is an effective anti-personnel weapon, against light armored vehicles and firing posts.

== Operational history ==
The weapon was adopted by the Polish Army in 1985 as the "RPG-76 Komar".

With the warhead incapable of penetrating the front armor of modern western tanks it became an auxiliary weapon, not replacing standard issue RPG-7 grenade launchers in infantry squads.

It was produced in the Precision works in Niewiadów, Poland. Around 100,000 were manufactured between 1983 and 1995.

In the late 1990s it was withdrawn from front line units and stores due to limited anti-tank capabilities and increased safety demands (a lack of self-destructor). Polish deployments in Iraq and Afghanistan changed this policy, and the weapon was deployed to troops, using the Komar in Iraq and in Afghanistan. Polish soldiers also used a small number of heavier multipurpose Carl Gustav recoilless rifles using a variety of modern ammunition types.

In March 2022, Poland started to deliver surplus RPG-76 to Ukraine as a response to the Russian invasion of Ukraine.

== Users ==
=== Current ===
- Ukraine

=== Former ===
- Poland

== Similar weapons ==
- Panzerfaust – (Nazi Germany)
- M80 Zolja – (Socialist Federal Republic of Yugoslavia)
- RPG-18 – (Soviet Union)
- M72 LAW – (United States)

== See also ==
- Sturmpistole
- Type 69 RPG
