= RPG-18 =

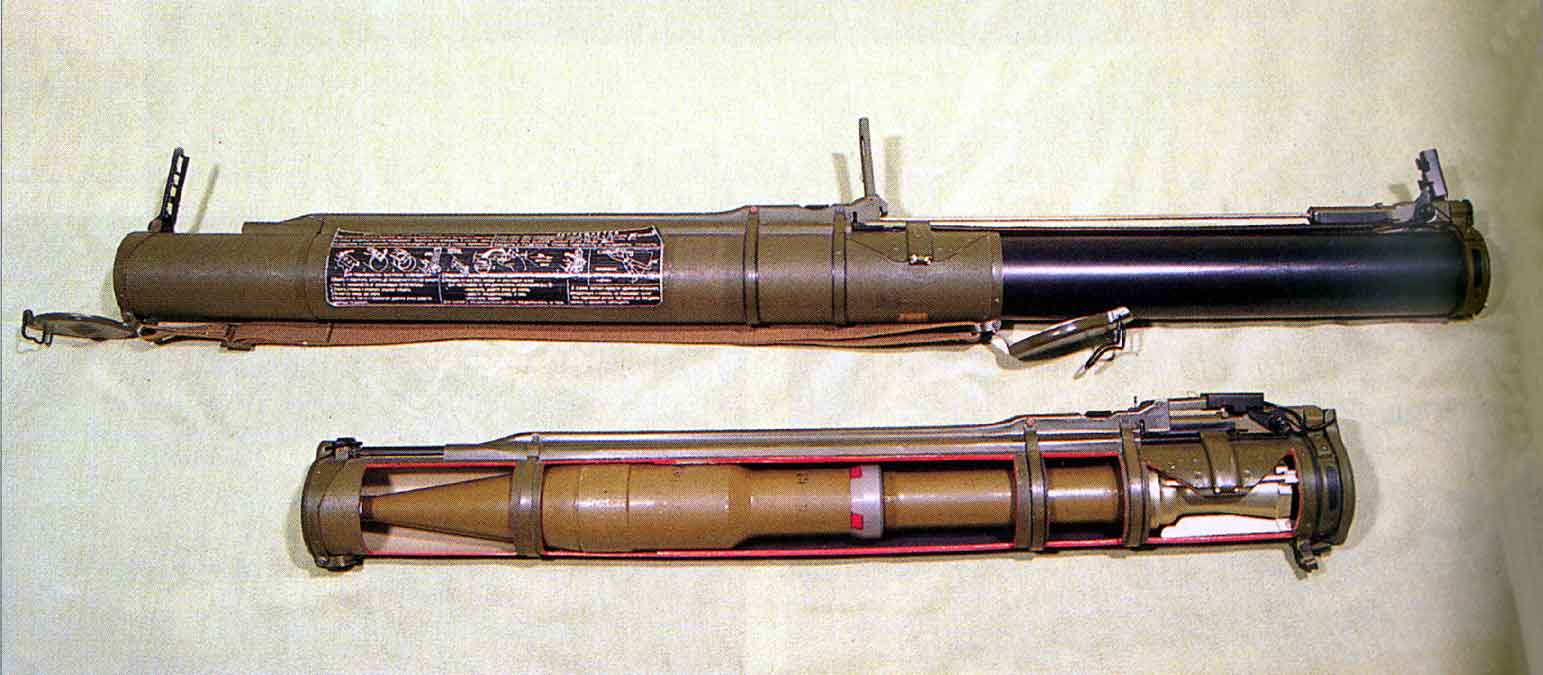
- RPG-18 rocket launcher with PG-18 rocket
- Type: Rocket-propelled grenade
- Place of origin: Soviet Union

Service history
- In service: 1972–present
- Used by: See users
- Wars: Vietnam War; Cambodian Civil War; Laotian Civil War; Sino-Vietnamese War; Cambodian–Vietnamese War; Third Indochina War; Soviet–Afghan War; Salvadoran Civil War; Gulf War; First Nagorno-Karabakh War; Tajikistani Civil War; First Chechen War; Congo Civil War; Second Chechen War; War in Afghanistan; Iraq War; Russo-Georgian War; Kivu conflict Syrian civil war Russo-Ukrainian War

Production history
- Designed: 1972
- Manufacturer: Bazalt (Soviet Union); VEB Mechanische Werkstätten (East Germany)
- Produced: 1972-1990 (Soviet Union); 1978-1989 (East Germany

Specifications
- Mass: 1.4 kg (projectile); 2.6 kg (loaded)
- Length: 705 mm (unarmed); 1,050 mm (ready to fire)
- Crew: 1
- Shell: PG-18 HEAT
- Caliber: 64 mm
- Rate of fire: Single shot
- Muzzle velocity: 115 m/s
- Effective firing range: 100-150m
- Maximum firing range: 200m
- Sights: Mechanical flip-up sight

The RPG-18 Mukha (Russian: Муха, romanized: Fly) is a Soviet short-range, disposable light anti-tank rocket launcher designed in 1972, based on the American M72 LAW. The RPG-18 has been in service in over 20 conflicts and used by over 20 armed forces across the world.

== History ==
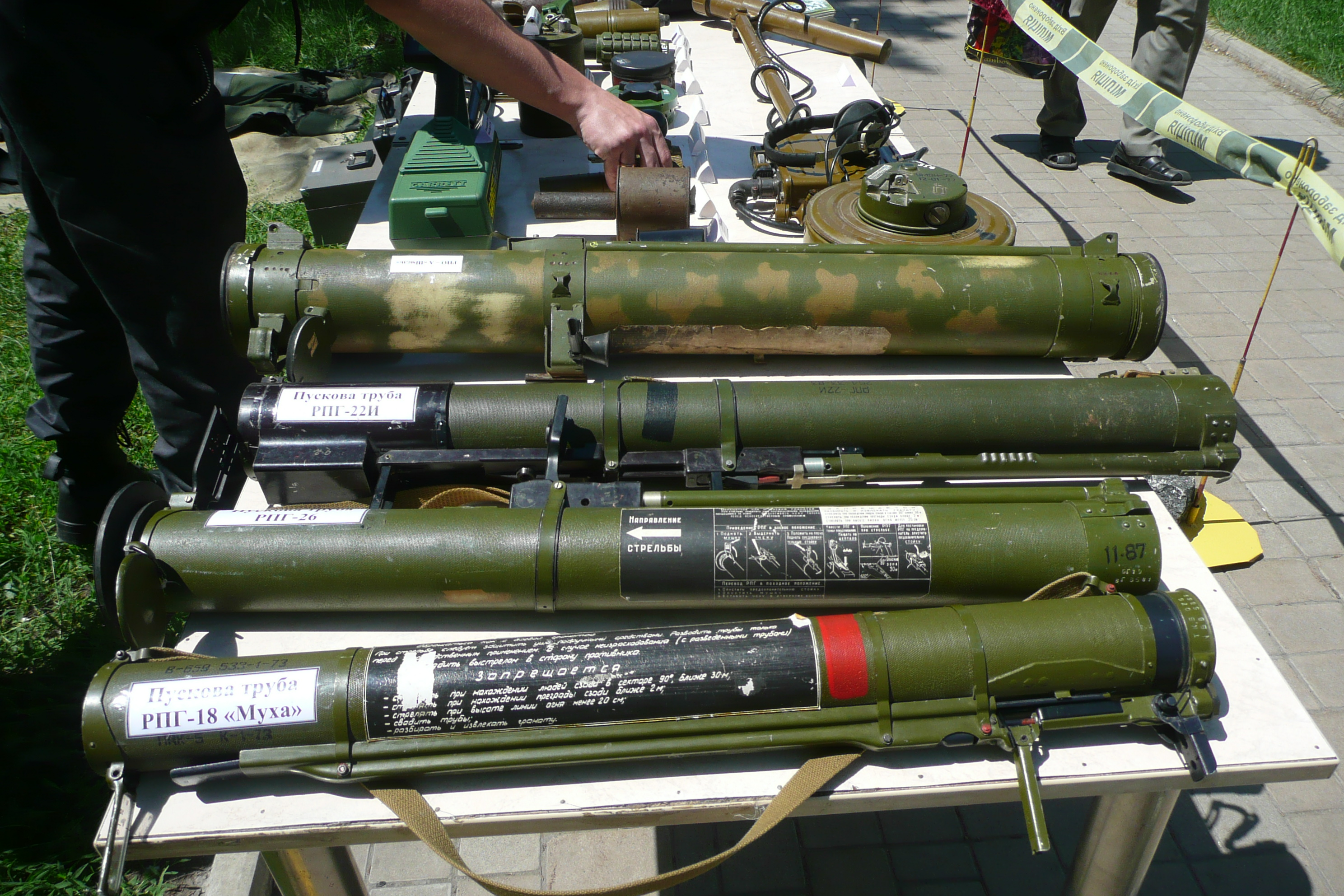
RPG-18 (bottom) with comparable Soviet/Russian rocket launchers

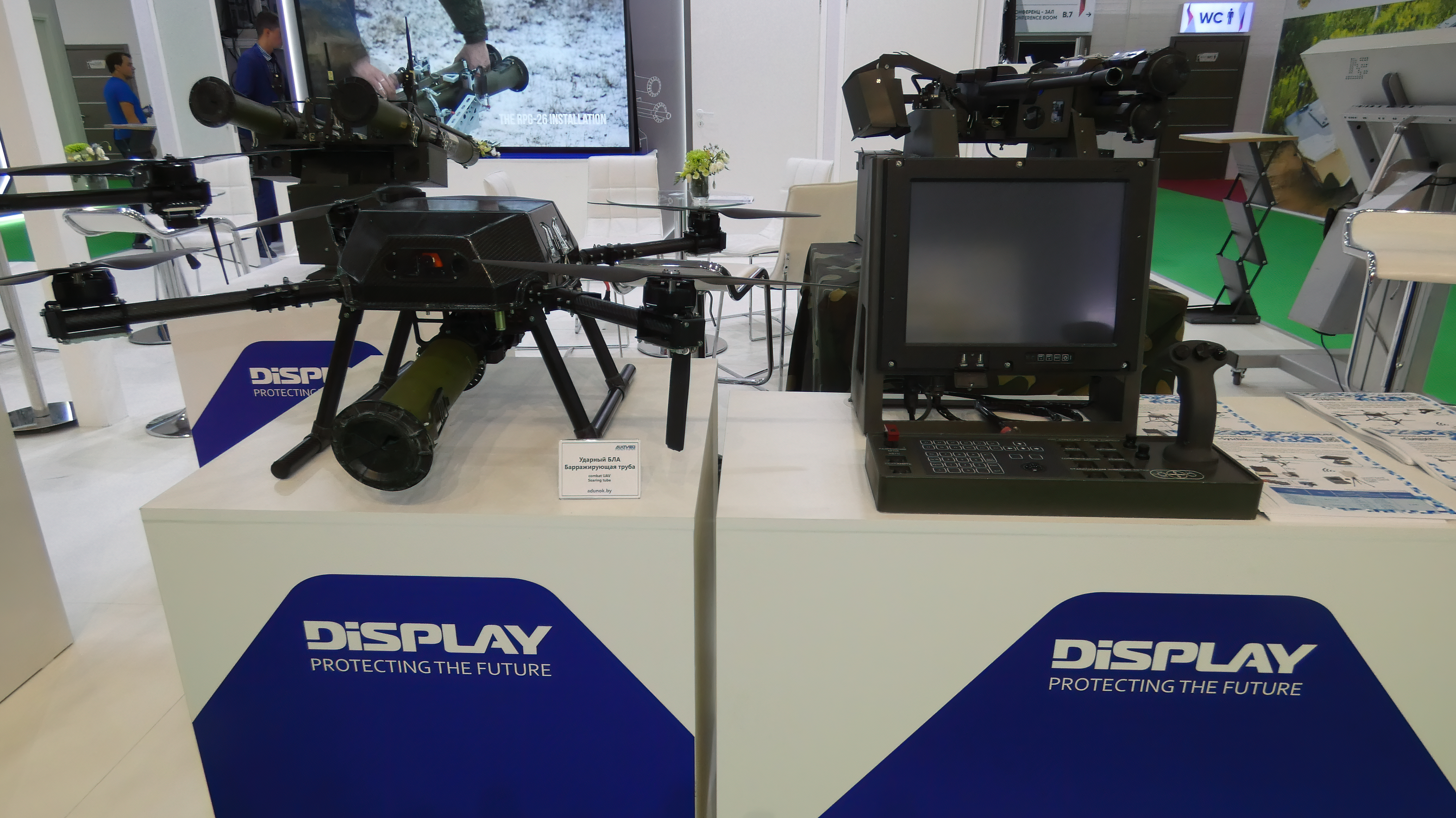
An RPG-18 attached to a drone

The RPG-18 is very similar to the US M72-series LAW anti-tank rocket launcher, with captured examples during the Vietnam War likely being sent to the Soviet Union. The RPG-18 has been succeeded by the RPG-22, a very similar design with a larger warhead.

== Description ==
The RPG-18 fires a 64 mm PG-18 high-explosive anti-tank (HEAT) warhead mounted on a small rocket able to engage targets within 200 meters. The warhead self-destructs six seconds after launch, placing a limit on range even if a sight was used that was effective with targets beyond 200 meters.

The RPG-18 can penetrate up to 300 mm of conventional vehicle armor (RHA); up to 500 mm of reinforced concrete; and up to 1,000 mm of brickwork. However, performance is significantly lessened when the RPG-18 is used against targets protected by HEAT-resistant explosive reactive armour (ERA) or composite armor.

Unlike similar weapons, the RPG-18 requires only one operator as it is not reloadable.

== Users ==
- Afghanistan
- Armenia
- Azerbaijan
- Belarus
- Chad
- Congo
- Georgia
- Greece
- Hamas
- (Iraq) Iraqi insurgents
- Islamic State
- Kazakhstan
- Kyrgyzstan
- Moldova
  - Transnistria
- Panama
- Russia
- Syria
  - Free Syrian Army
- Tajikistan
- Turkmenistan
- Ukraine
- Uzbekistan

=== Former users ===
- Chechen Republic of Ichkeria
- Democratic Forces for the Liberation of Rwanda
- Donetsk People's Republic: Used by DPR forces during the War in Donbas and the Russian invasion of Ukraine before their annexation by Russia in November 2022.
- Farabundo Marti National Liberation Front (FMLN)
- East Germany
- Nicaragua: Sandinista Popular Army
- Soviet Union: Passed on to successor states.
- Real Irish Republican Army

== See also ==
- RPG-76 Komar – (Polish People's Republic, Poland)
- M80 Zolja – (Socialist Federal Republic of Yugoslavia)
