= M72 LAW =

Anti-tank rocket-propelled grenade launcher

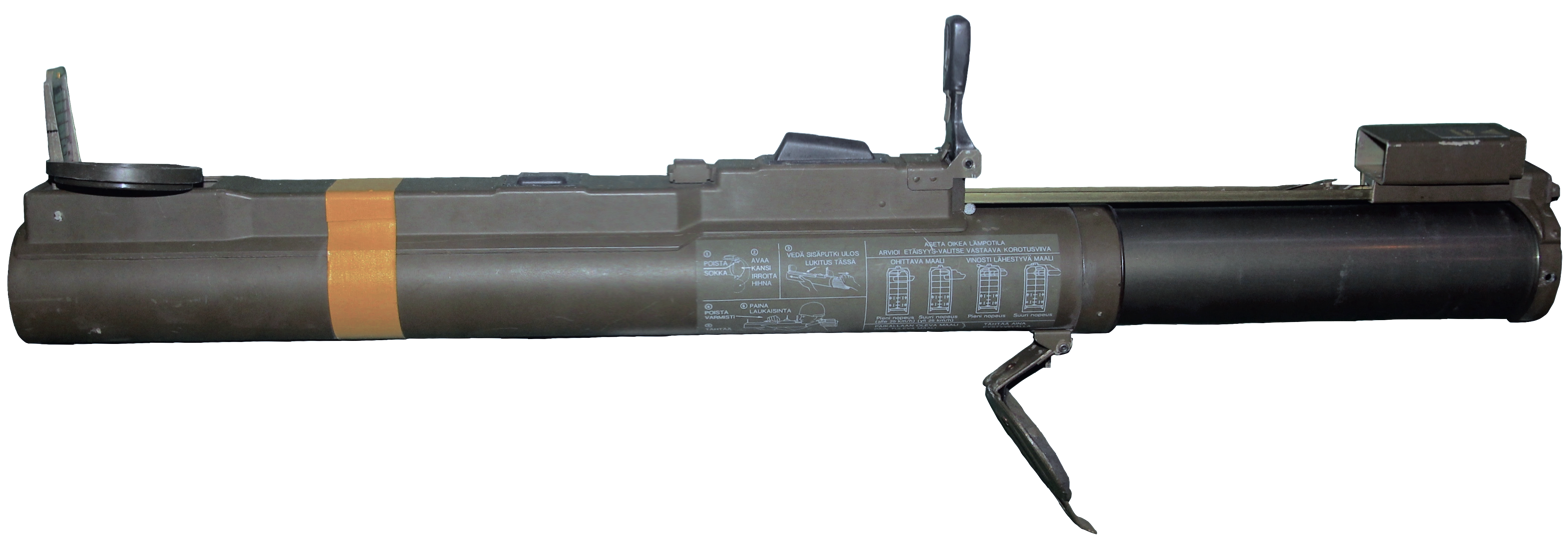
- An M72 LAW in extended position
- Type: Anti-tank disposable rocket-propelled grenade launcher
- Place of origin: United States

Service history
- In service: 1963–present
- Used by: See Operators
- Wars: Vietnam War; Cambodian Civil War; Laotian Civil War; Sino-Vietnamese War Lebanese Civil War; Nicaraguan Revolution; Falklands War; Salvadoran Civil War; Gulf War; Bougainville Civil War; Somali Civil War; Bosnian War; War in Afghanistan; Iraq War; Syrian Civil War; Yemeni Civil War; Russo-Ukrainian War; Gaza war

Production history
- Designer: FA Spinale, CB Weeks and PV Choate
- Designed: Patent filed 1963
- Manufacturer: Norway: NAMMO (Raufoss, Norway); U.S.: NAMMO Defense Systems (Mesa, Arizona); Turkey: under license by MKEK
- Produced: 1963–1980; 2004–present

Specifications
- Mass: 2.5 kg (5.5 lb) (M72A1–3) / 3.6 kg (7.9 lb) (M72A4–7)
- Length: 630 mm (24.8 in) (unarmed); 881 mm (34.67 in) (armed)
- Caliber: 66 mm (2.6 in)
- Muzzle velocity: 145 m/s (480 ft/s)(M72A1–3); 200 m/s (660 ft/s)(M72A4–7)
- Effective firing range: 200 m (660 ft), 220 m (720 ft) (A4–7)
- Detonation mechanism: Point-initiated, base-detonated

The M72 LAW (light anti-tank weapon, also referred to as the light anti-armor weapon or LAW as well as LAWS: light anti-armor weapons system) is a man-portable 66 mm (2.6 in) disposable unguided anti-tank weapon.

In early 1963, the M72 LAW was adopted by the U.S. Army and U.S. Marine Corps as their primary individual infantry anti-tank weapon, replacing the M31 HEAT rifle grenade and the M20A1 "Super Bazooka" in the U.S. Army. It was subsequently adopted by the U.S. Air Force to serve in an anti-emplacement and anti-armor role in airbase defense. (Note: The U.S. Army partially replaced the Super Bazooka not only with the M72 LAW, but also the M67 recoilless rifle, and U.S. Marines kept the Super Bazooka in service until the late 1960s.)

In the early 1980s, the M72 was slated to be replaced by the FGR-17 Viper. However, the Viper program was canceled by Congress and the M136 AT4 was adopted instead. At that time, its nearest equivalents were the Swedish Pskott m/68 (Miniman) and the French SARPAC.

== Background ==
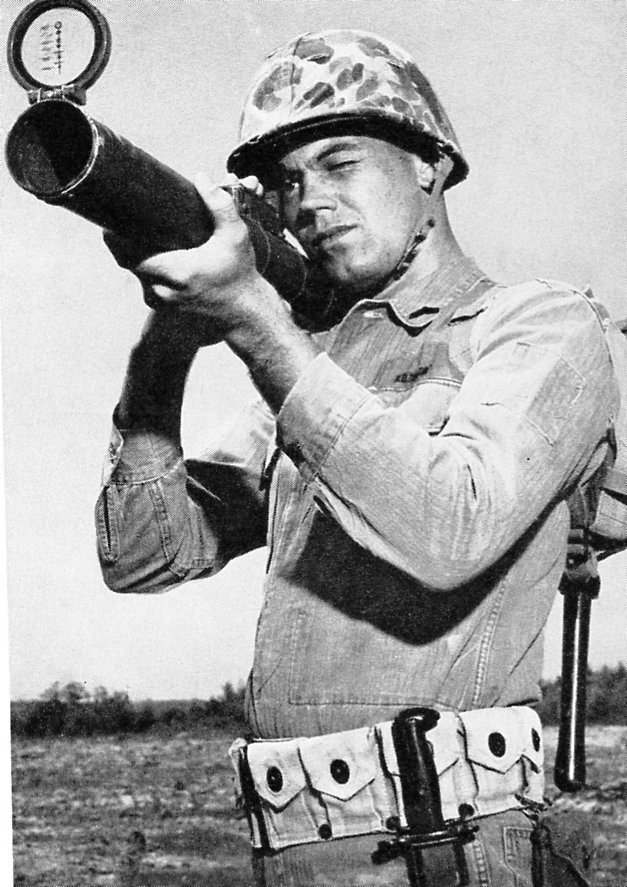
1961 LAW prototype, showing the rejected front sight that also served as the front cover

The increased importance of tanks and other armored vehicles in World War II caused a need for portable infantry weapons to deal with them. The first to be used (with varying successes) were Molotov cocktails, flamethrowers, satchel charges, jury-rigged landmines, and specially designed magnetic hollow charges. All of these had to be used within a few meters of the target, which was difficult and dangerous.

The U.S. Army introduced the bazooka, the first rocket-propelled grenade launcher. Despite early problems, it was a success and was copied by other countries.

However, the bazooka had its drawbacks. Large and easily damaged, it required a well-trained two-man crew. Germany developed a one-man alternative, the Panzerfaust, having single-shot launchers that were cheap and required no special training. As a result, they were regularly issued to Volkssturm home-guard regiments. They were efficient against tanks during the last days of World War II.

The M72 LAW is a combination of the two World War II weapons. The basic principle is a miniaturized bazooka, while its light weight and cheapness rival the Panzerfaust.

== Development and production ==
The solid rocket propulsion unit was developed in the newly formed Rohm and Haas research laboratory at Redstone Arsenal in 1959, and the full system was designed by Paul V. Choate, Charles B. Weeks, Frank A. Spinale, et al. at the Hesse-Eastern Division of Norris Thermador. American production of the weapon began by Hesse-Eastern in 1963, and was terminated by 1983; currently it is produced by Nammo Raufoss AS in Norway and their subsidiary, Nammo Defense Systems (formerly Nammo Talley Inc.) in Arizona.

== Description ==
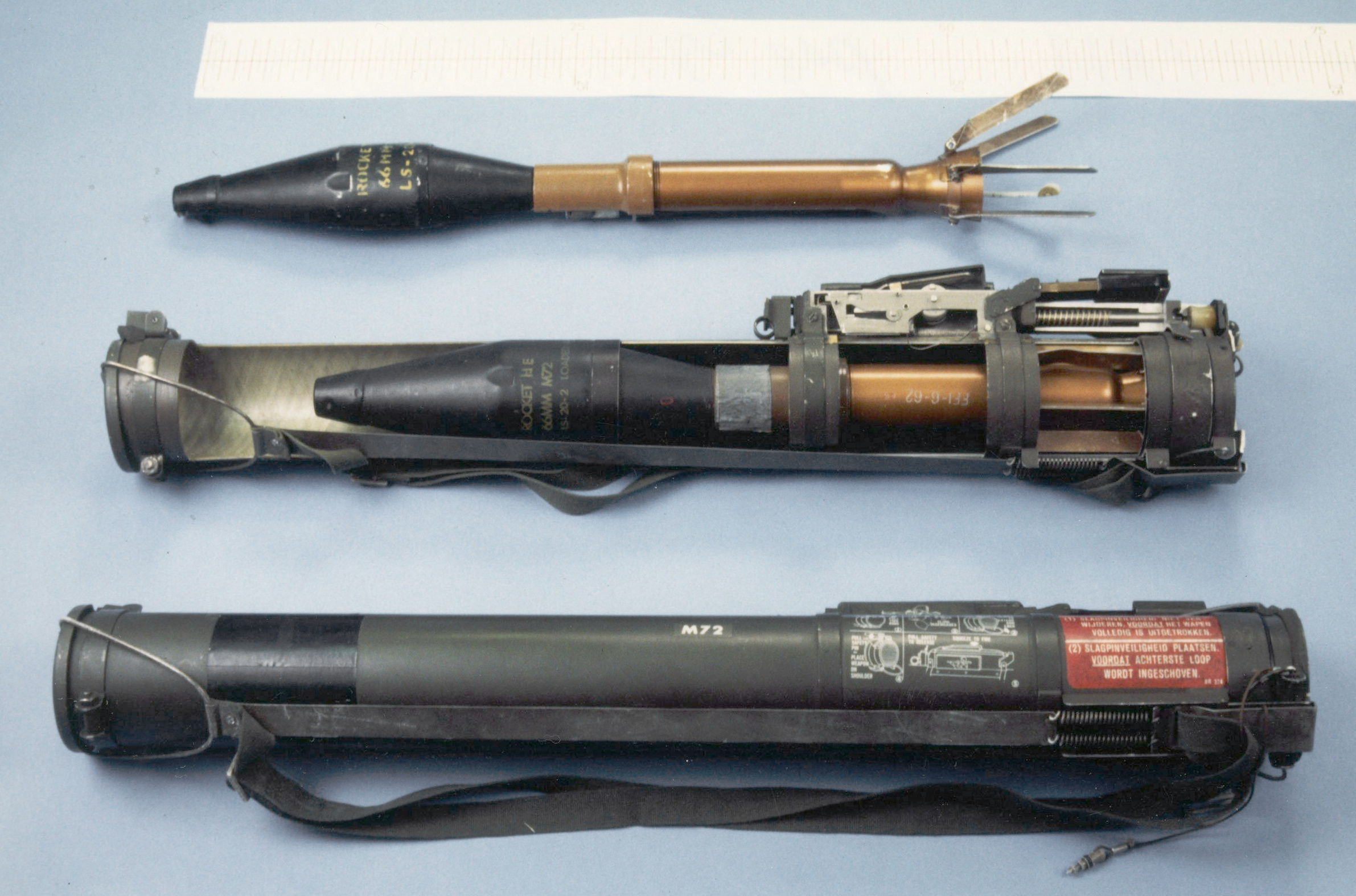
M72 rocket and launcher in cross-section

The weapon consists of a rocket within a launcher consisting of two tubes, one inside the other. While closed, the outer assembly serves as a watertight container for the rocket and the percussion-cap firing mechanism that activates the rocket. The outer tube contains the trigger, the arming handle, front and rear sights, and the rear cover. The inner tube contains the channel assembly, which houses the firing pin assembly, including the detent lever. When extended, the inner tube telescopes outward toward the rear, guided by the channel assembly, which rides in an alignment slot in the outer tube's trigger housing assembly. This causes the detent lever to move under the trigger assembly in the outer tube, both locking the inner tube in the extended position and cocking the weapon. Once armed, the weapon is no longer watertight, even if the launcher is collapsed into its original configuration. It is a line of sight weapon with a range around 200 meters (660 ft).

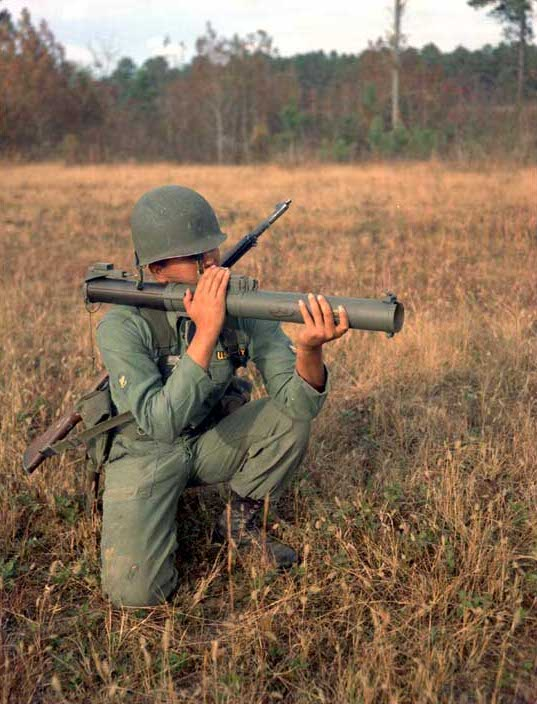
M72 demonstration at Fort Benning, Georgia, in the 1960s

When fired, the striker in the rear tube impacts a primer, which ignites a small amount of powder that "flashes" down a tube to the rear of the rocket and ignites the propellant in the rocket motor. The rocket motor burns completely before leaving the mouth of the launcher, producing a backblast of gases around 1,400 °F (760 °C). The rocket propels the 66 mm (2.6 in) warhead forward without significant recoil. As the warhead emerges from the launcher, six fins spring out from the base of the rocket tube, stabilizing the warhead's flight. The early LAW warhead, developed from the M31 HEAT rifle grenade warhead, uses a simple piezoelectric fuse system. On impact with the target, the front of the nose section is crushed, causing a microsecond electric current to be generated, which detonates a booster charge located in the base of the warhead, which sets off the main warhead charge. The force of the main charge forces the copper liner into a directional particle jet that, in relation to the size of the warhead, is capable of a massive penetration.

A unique mechanical set-back safety on the base of the detonator grounds the circuit until the missile has accelerated out of the tube. The acceleration causes the three disks in the safety mechanism to rotate 90° in succession, ungrounding the circuit; the circuit from the nose to the base of the detonator is then completed when the piezoelectric crystal is crushed on impact.

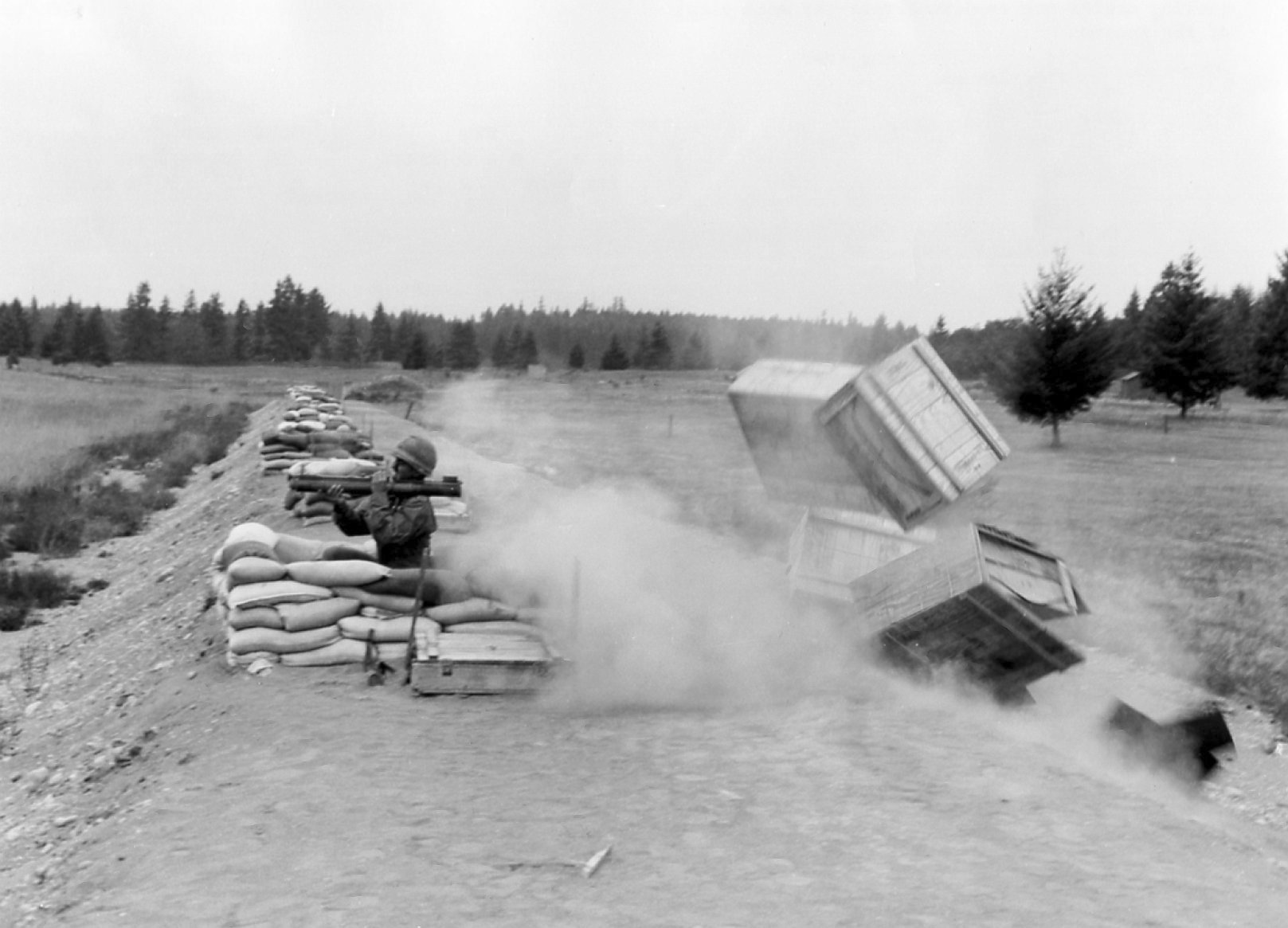
Packing crates are used to demonstrate the danger of the M72's back blast

The weapon can be fired from inside buildings as long as the structures are at least 3.7 by 4.6 m (12 by 15 ft) in size, which is about 50 cubic meters (1,800 ft^{3}) in volume, and have sufficient ventilation. The Department of the Army previously rated the weapon as safe to fire from enclosure, but this rating was removed in 2010 after the introduction of the safer AT4 CS. However, some modern variants of the LAW are specifically designed with fire-from-enclosure (FFE) capability.

In late 2021, Nammo unveiled the concept of a multi-rotor unmanned aerial vehicle (UAV) equipped with a LAW. The tube is mounted facing downward, enabling the drone operator to fire on tanks and armored vehicles from a top attack position while remaining 3 to 4 km (1.9 to 2.5 mi) away.

== Ammunition ==
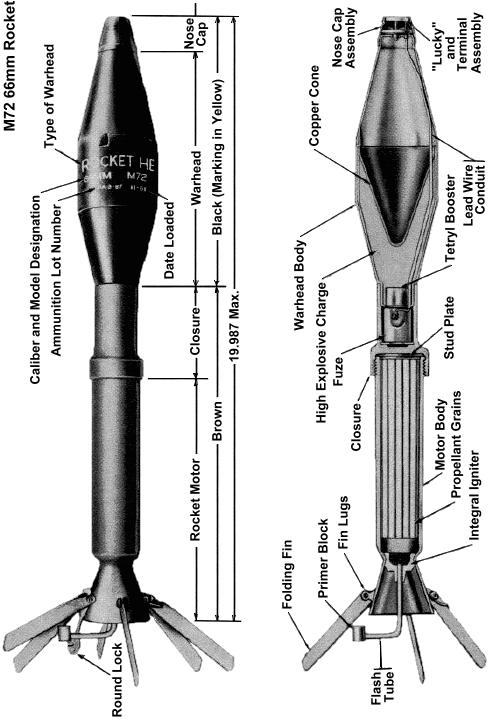
An M72 LAW's rocket

M72 LAWs used 66 mm (2.6 in) rockets, which were issued with the launcher itself. Improvements to the launcher and differences in the ammunition were differentiated by a single designation. The M72A2's warhead penetrated 30 cm (12 in) of armor.

A training variant of the M72 LAW, designated M190, also exists. This weapon is reloadable and uses the 35 mm (1.4 in) M73 training rocket. A subcaliber training device that uses a special tracer cartridge also exists for the M72. A training variant used by the Finnish armed forces fires 7.62 mm (0.300 in) tracer rounds.

The US Army tested other 66 mm rockets based on the M54 rocket motor used for the M72. The M74 TPA (thickened pyrophoric agent) had an incendiary warhead filled with TEA (triethylaluminum); this was used in the M202A1 FLASH (flame assault shoulder weapon) four-tube launcher. The XM96 RCR (riot control rocket) had a CS gas-filled warhead for crowd control and was also intended for use with the M202, though the rocket never entered service.

== Service history ==
=== Australia ===
The M72 rocket has been in Australian service since the Vietnam War. Currently, the Australian Defence Force uses the M72A6 variant, known as the "light direct fire support weapon", as an anti-structure and secondary anti-armor weapon. The weapon is used by ordinary troops at the section (squad) level and complements the heavier 84 mm (3.3 in) Carl Gustav recoilless rifle and Javelin missile, which are generally used by specialized fire support and anti-armor troops.

=== Canada ===
As of 21 February 2023, Canada has supplied 4,500 M72s to Ukraine for use in the Russo-Ukrainian War. These are of the M72A5-C1 designation.

=== Finland ===
The M72 LAW is used in the Finnish Army (some 70,000 pieces), where it is known under the designations 66 KES 75 (M72A2, no longer in service) and 66 KES 88 (M72A5). In accordance with the weapon's known limitations, a pair of "tank-buster" troops crawl to a firing position around 50 to 150 meters (160 to 490 ft) away from the target, bringing with them four to six LAWs, which are then used in rapid succession until the target is destroyed or incapacitated. Due to its low penetration capability, it is used mostly against lightly armored targets. The M72 is the most common anti-tank weapon in the Finnish Army. Finland has recently upgraded its stocks to the M72 EC LAW Mk.I version. It is designated 66 KES 12 Claimed penetration for the M72 EC LAW is 450 mm (18 in) of rolled homogeneous armor steel plate, nearly twice that of the M72A2. It also fields the bunker-buster version that contains 440 g (0.97 lb) of DPX-6 explosive, named M72 ASM RC, and locally designated 66 KES 12 RAK. The oldest version of the 66 KES 75 is now retired.

=== Israel ===
Having first arrived in Israel during The Yom Kippur War as part of Operation Nickel Grass, the LAW is the primary light anti tank weapon of the Israeli infantry, and has been used extensively throughout the different wars and conflicts, including the current Gaza war.

=== Norway ===
In late February 2022, the Norwegian government announced that it intended to donate "up to 2,000" M72 LAW units from their reserve stocks to Ukraine, in response to the Russian invasion. On March 30, 2022, the Norwegian Defence Ministry said that 2,000 more units will be sent to Ukraine.

=== Taiwan ===
The Republic of China Army (Taiwan) uses the M72 as a secondary anti-armor weapon for infantry units. It is used primarily as a backup to the Javelin and BGM-71 TOW anti-tank weapons. The weapon was later reverse-engineered into the "Type 1 66 mm anti-armor rocket", which was introduced from M72 A2, but is more-popularly nicknamed as the "Type 66 rocket" due to its caliber. After several decades of application, the Type 66mm anti-armor rocket has evolved into Kestrel (67mm) model since 2008.

=== Turkey ===
The Turkish Army uses a locally built version by Makina ve Kimya Endustrisi Kurumu, called HAR-66 (Hafif Antitank Roketi, 'light antitank rocket'), which has the performance and characteristics of a mix of an M72A2 and an A3. Turkey also indigenously developed an anti-personnel warhead version of HAR-66 AP and called it "Eşek Arısı" ('wasp').

=== United Kingdom ===
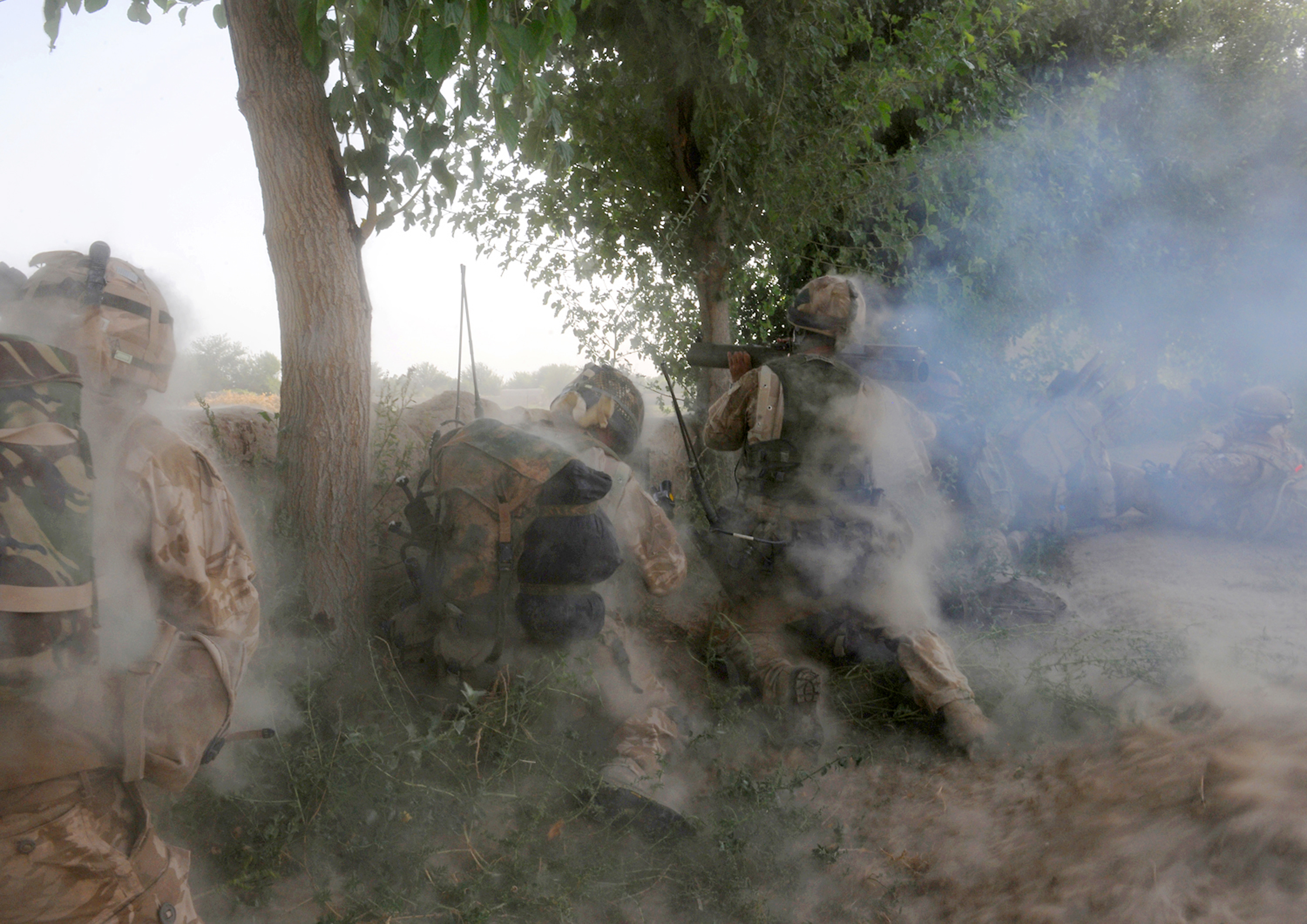
British soldier firing an L1A1 in Afghanistan, 2009

The British Army employed the NAMMO M72, designated as the "Rocket 66 mm HEAT L1A1," until it was phased out and replaced by the LAW 80 in the 1980s. The M72 saw active use during the 1982 Falklands War, where it was primarily utilized to suppress Argentinian defensive positions at close range. Additionally, it was used against an assault amphibious vehicle during the initial invasion and played a role in damaging the Argentinian warship ARA Guerrico during the invasion of South Georgia.

Under the 2012 Urgent Operational Requirement program, the M72 was reintroduced into British service, with the M72A9 variant being designated as the Light Anti-Structure Munition (LASM).

=== United States ===
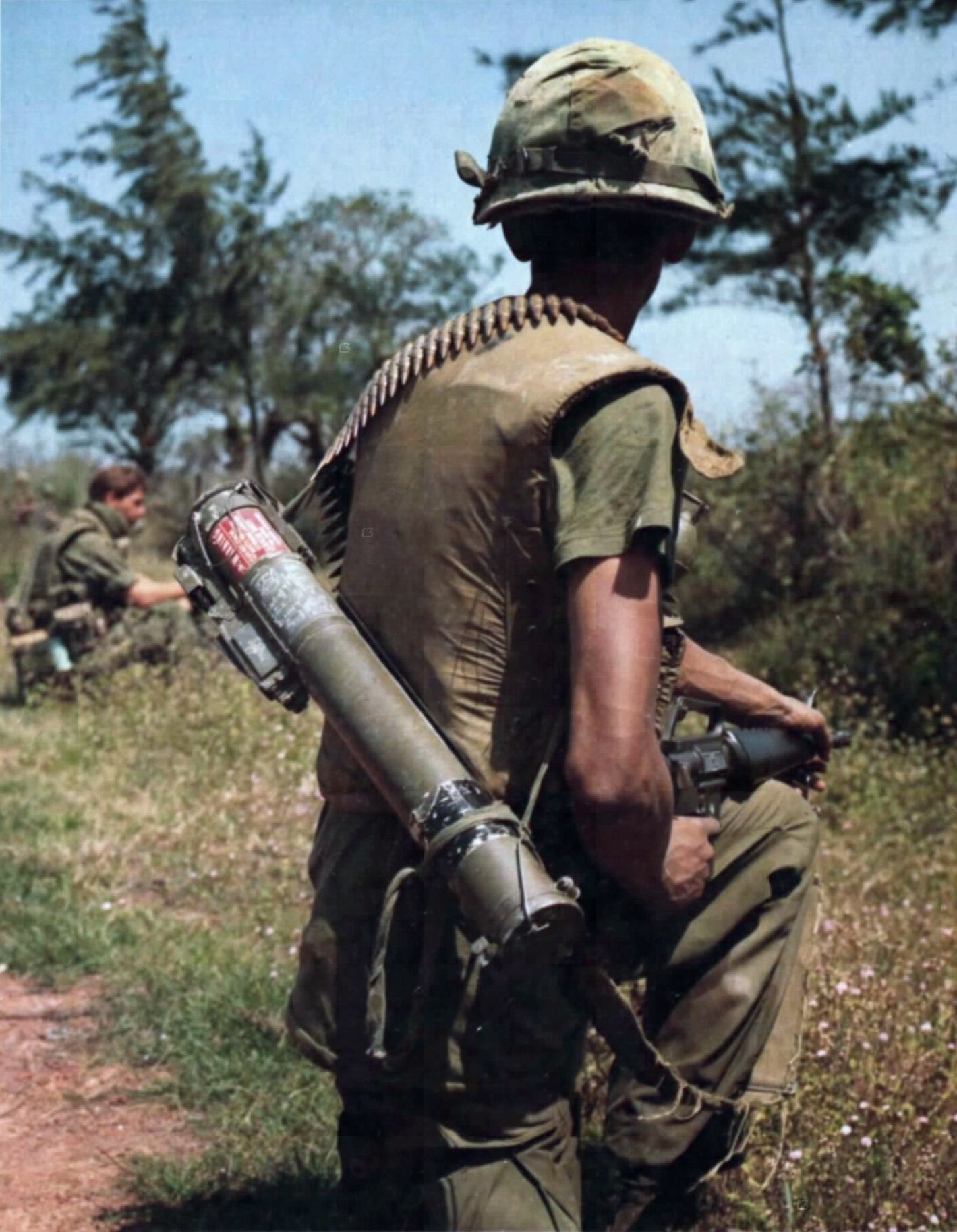
M72 as used in Vietnam, 1968

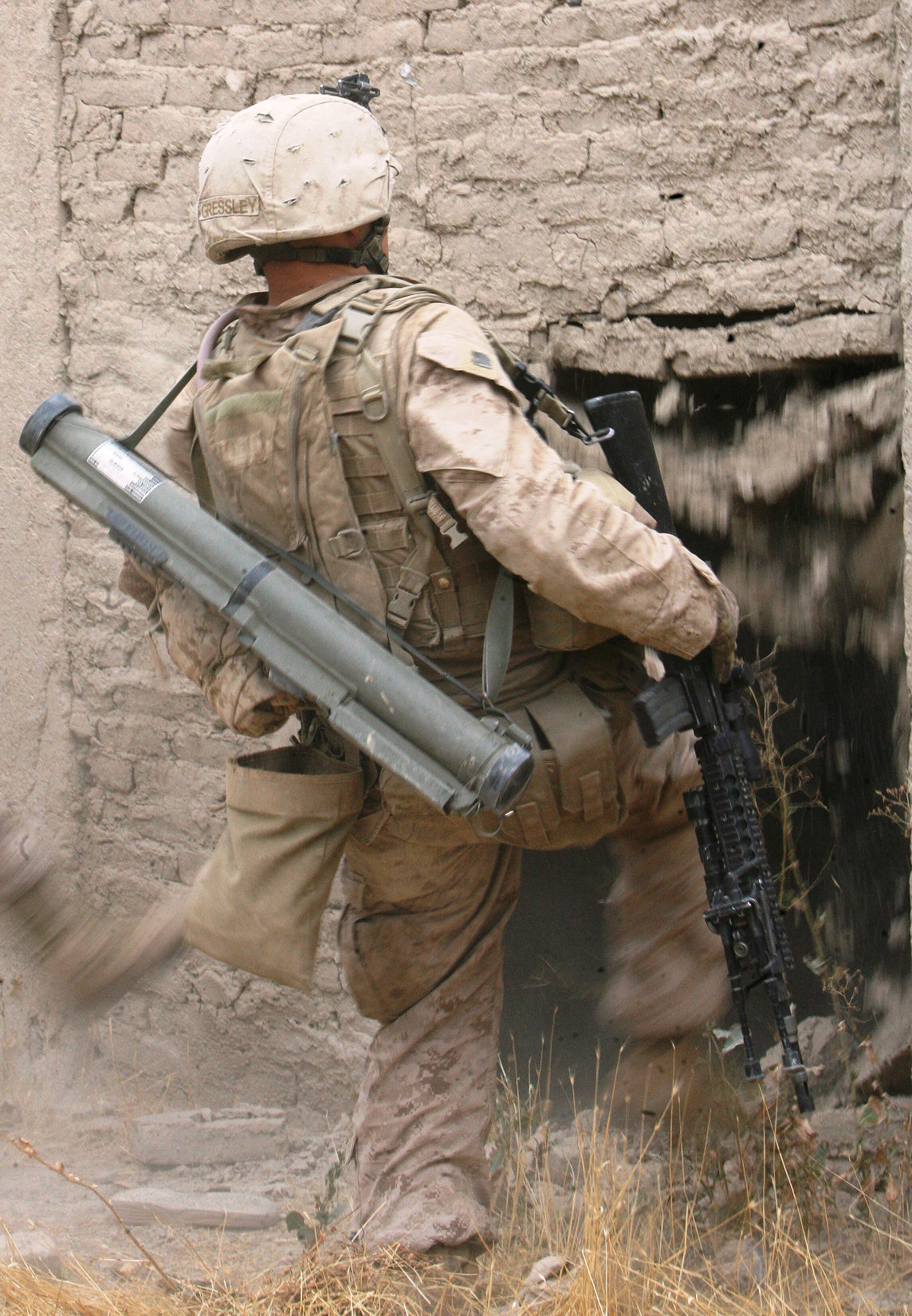
Modern M72A7 in use in Afghanistan with US Marines, 2009

During and after Vietnam War, all issued LAWs were recalled after instances of the warhead exploding in flight, sometimes injuring the operator. Each LAW that received the safety modifications was stenciled "w/coupler". (Note: Some reports state these instances were caused by misfires due to water in the flash tube and by unproven rumors of sabotage at the manufacturing plant during the Vietnam War.)

With the failure of the M72's intended replacement, the Viper, in late 1982 Congress ordered the US Army to test off-the-shelf light antitank weapons and report back by the end of 1983. Raufoss AS and Talley Defense offered the M72E4, which provided better range, velocity, and sights, but the AT4's higher speed and range were found to have a higher hit probability in 1985 tests by the U.S. Army Materiel Systems Analysis Activity (AMSAA). The AT4 was chosen to replace the M72.

The M72 LAW remained in U.S. service due to existing stockpiles and the U.S. Air Force continuing to purchase M72A3 LAWs until at least 2009. The LAW also found new popularity in operations with the U.S. Army, the U.S. Marine Corps, and Canadian Army in Iraq and Afghanistan. The lower cost and lighter weight of the LAW, combined with a scarcity of modern heavy armored targets and the need for an individual assault weapon versus an individual anti-armor weapon, made it ideal for the type of urban combat seen in Iraq and mountain warfare seen in Afghanistan. In addition, a soldier can carry two LAWs on a mission as opposed to a single AT4.

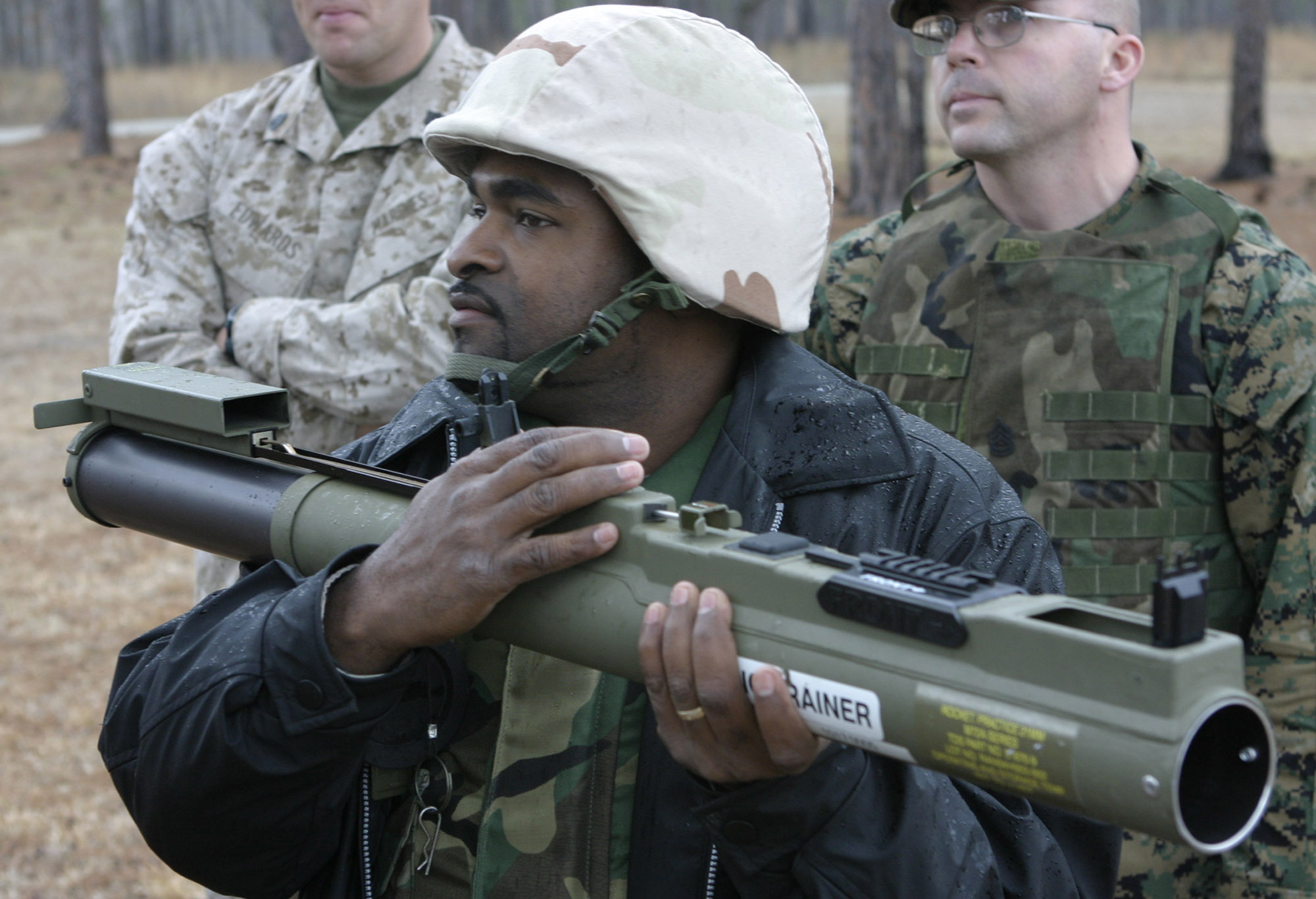
M72A7 firing trainer, showing a Picatinny rail

In February 2005, the Naval Surface Warfare Center, Dahlgren Division (NSWCDD) issued a solicitation to procure 2,558 M72A7 66mm HE LAW w/Graze Fuze Function and NVD Mount with the award date estimated as mid-May 2005. U.S. Marine Corps officials also identified the M72A7 LAW as an urgent requirement in support of the global war on terrorism, with the USMC initially purchasing 1,136 M72A7s in 2005. The U.S. Marine Corps increased M72A7 LAW purchases after 2005, with the service purchasing about 23,000 over a three-year period from 2007 to 2009. Later in 2010, the U.S. Army also began using the M72A7 LAW in Afghanistan because it was found to be a useful small and lightweight rocket system for engaging short- and medium-range targets. Foot patrols particularly benefited from it due to Afghanistan's difficult terrain and high elevations. The U.S. Marine Corps was still purchasing M72A7 LAW rockets as of March 2023.

The M72A7 LAW is an improved version of its predecessors, featuring a better rocket motor that increases velocity to 200 m/s (660 ft/s) for greater accuracy beyond 200 meters (660 feet), a Picatinny rail for mounting laser pointers and night sights, and the warhead contains a copper explosively formed penetrator (EFP), instead of a conical shaped charge. While the EFP has reduced penetration compared to the previous LAWs with a conical shaped charge, it creates a larger hole, resulting in greater spalling inside armored vehicles and increased fragmentation behind urban walls, making it more destructive. Safety was also improved with an insensitive munition warhead to reduce the risk of accidental detonation.

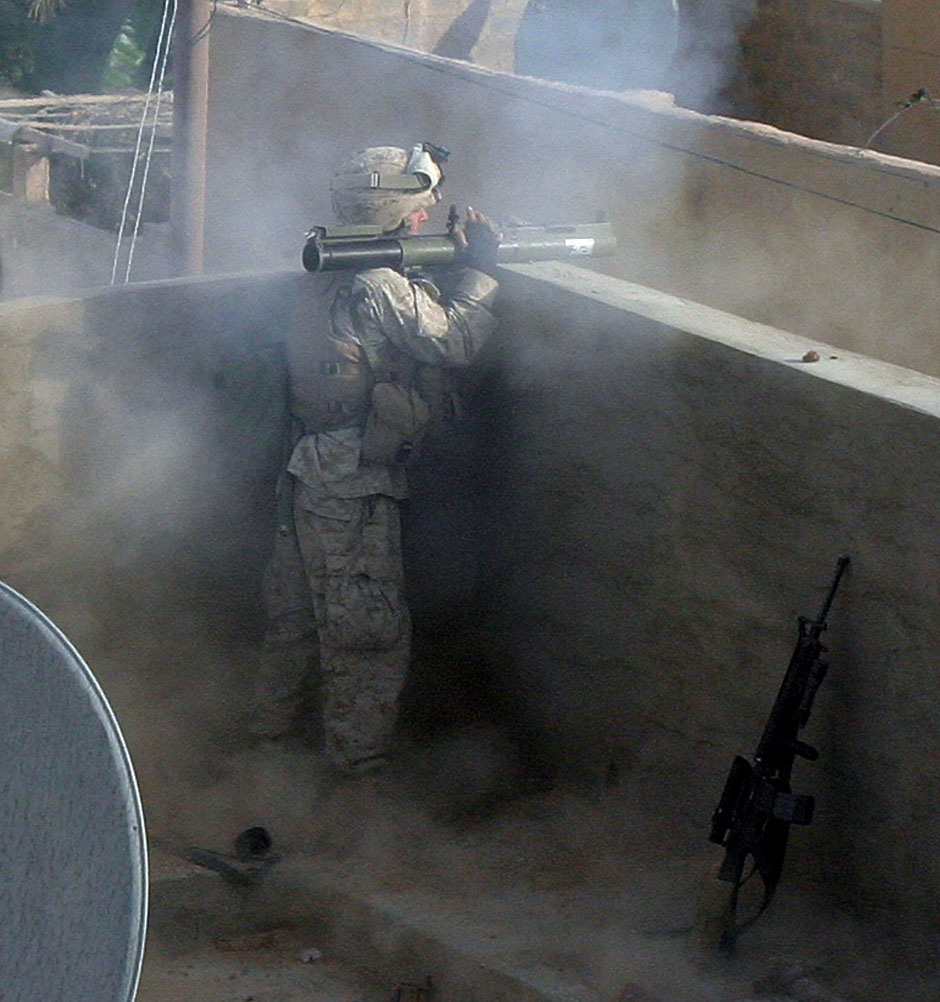
Marine firing an M72A7 in Iraq, 2005

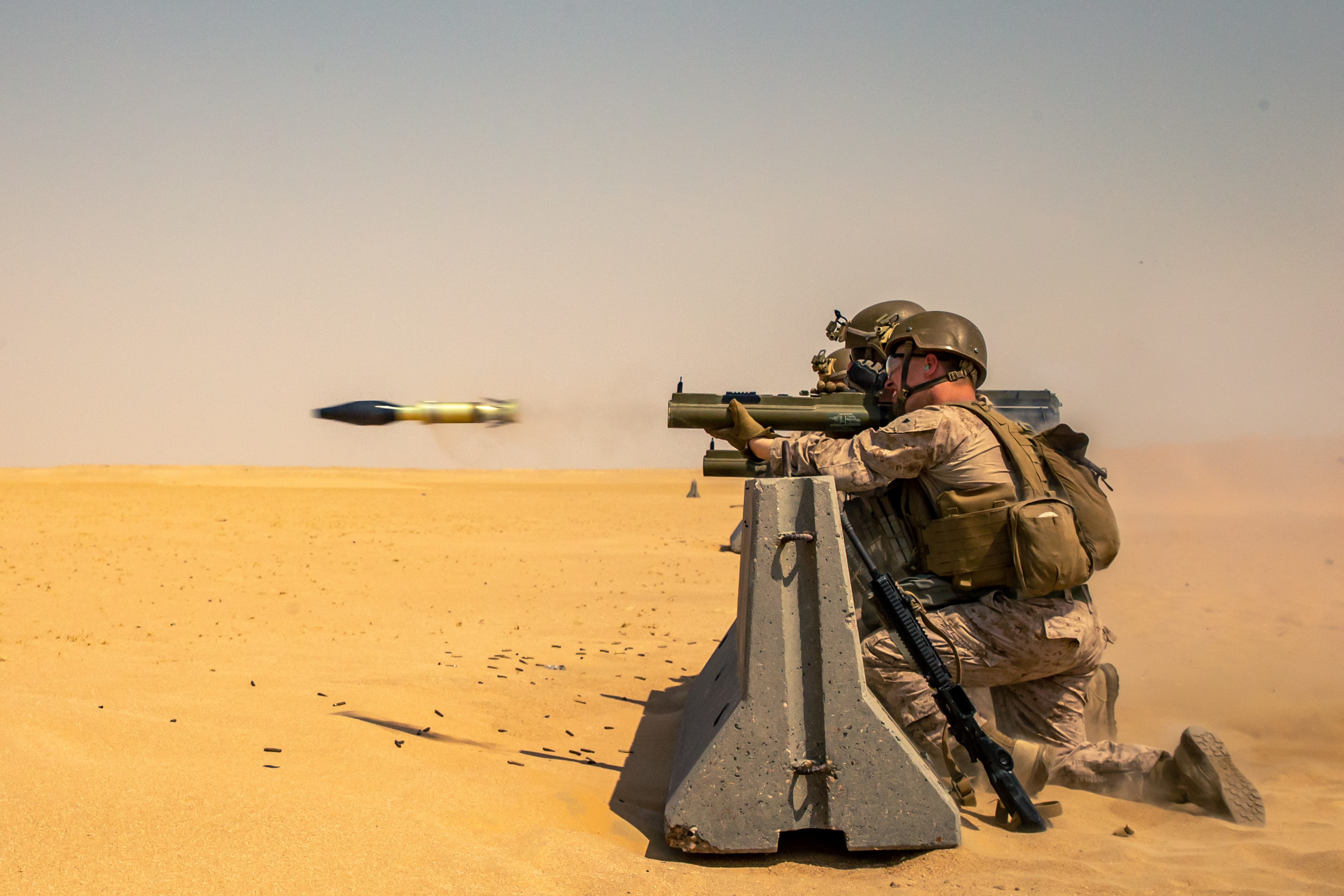
The rocket of the M72A7 seen in flight

M72A7 LAW firing

In May 2024, Marine Corps Systems Command announced the acquisition of the M72 Light Assault Weapon (LAW) Fire from Enclosure (FFE) Munition. It features an improved launcher with an enhanced in-line trigger mechanism and an upgraded sling design for better handling. The M72 FFE has two configurations: the M72A8 anti-armor and the M72A10 multi-purpose, anti-structure munition. The M72A8 contains a high-explosive anti-armor warhead with improved armor penetration, while the M72A10 provides Marines with the added capability of an anti-structure round designed to eliminate hardened structures such as buildings. The M72A10 features an advanced warhead design with a multipurpose explosive and a self-discriminating fuse that automatically operates in either a fast- or delay-mode depending on the target’s construction, allowing Marines to effectively engage structures, bunkers, and enemy personnel. The FFE variants are no longer classified as rocket launchers, as they lack a rocket motor. Instead, they function as recoilless launchers, using a propellant charge to propel a 66mm fin-stabilized ballistic projectile toward the target. A liquid counter-mass behind the propellant mitigates backblast, allowing the weapon to be safely fired from enclosed spaces. The M72 FFE replaces the M72A7 LAW, allowing Marines to fire multiple shots daily from enclosed spaces without risk of brain injury. It also produces less muzzle flash than an M9 pistol, reducing its visual and thermal signature. With these improvements, both M72 FFE variants significantly enhance infantry effectiveness against armored vehicles and fortified structures, in urban environments as well as complex terrain. Fielding is expected to begin in 2024.

=== Vietnam ===
Several M72A1 and M72A2 LAWs captured during the Vietnam War have been put into service with the chemical force of the Vietnam People's Army. The launchers are upgraded to be able to fire multiple times and are armed with M74 incendiary rounds.

== Variants ==
Designation	Description	US designation	International designation
M72	66 mm (2.6 in) Talley single-shot disposable rocket launcher; pre-loaded with HEAT rocket	M72	
M72A1	Improved rocket motor	M72A1	L1A1 (UK)
M72A2	Improved rocket motor, higher penetration	M72A2	66 KES 75 (Finland), L1A3 (UK)
M72A3	M72A2 variant; safety upgrades	M72A3	
M72A4	Rocket optimized for high penetration; uses improved launcher assembly	M72A4	
M72A5	M72A3 variant; uses improved launcher assembly	M72A5	66 KES 88 (Finland)
M72A6	Warhead modified for lower penetration but increased blast effect; uses improved launcher assembly	M72A6	
M72A7	M72A6 variant, insensitive-explosive (PBXN-9) version for US Navy	M72A7	
M72A7 graze	A7 variant with super-sensitive graze fuze, restricted from training use (combat-only)	M72A7 with graze	
M72A8	Anti-armor warhead with fire-from-enclosure (FFE) propulsion (formerly M72E8)	M72A8	
M72A9	Blast-optimized HE warhead, DPX-6 explosive		Light anti-structure missile (LASM) [UK]
M72A10	Anti-structure warhead with FFE propulsion (formerly M72E10)	M72A10	
M72E11	Airburst M72		
M72 EC	Enhanced capacity, increased anti-armor performance, 315 grams PBXW-11 explosive		66 KES 12 (Finland)
M72 ASM RC	Reduced-caliber 45 mm (1.8 in) anti-structure rocket, 0.4 kg (0.88 lb) DPX-6 explosive		66 KES 12 RAK (Finland)
M247	70 mm (2.75 in) rocket warhead using M72A2 warhead components, 910 g (2.0 lb) composition B explosive	M247	
HAR-66	Turkish variant, mix of A2 and A3 features		HAR-66 (Turkey)
M72AS	21 mm (0.83 in) reusable trainer	M72AS	
M190	35 mm (1.4 in) training variant, fires M73 practice rocket	M190	

=== Armor penetration and velocity ===
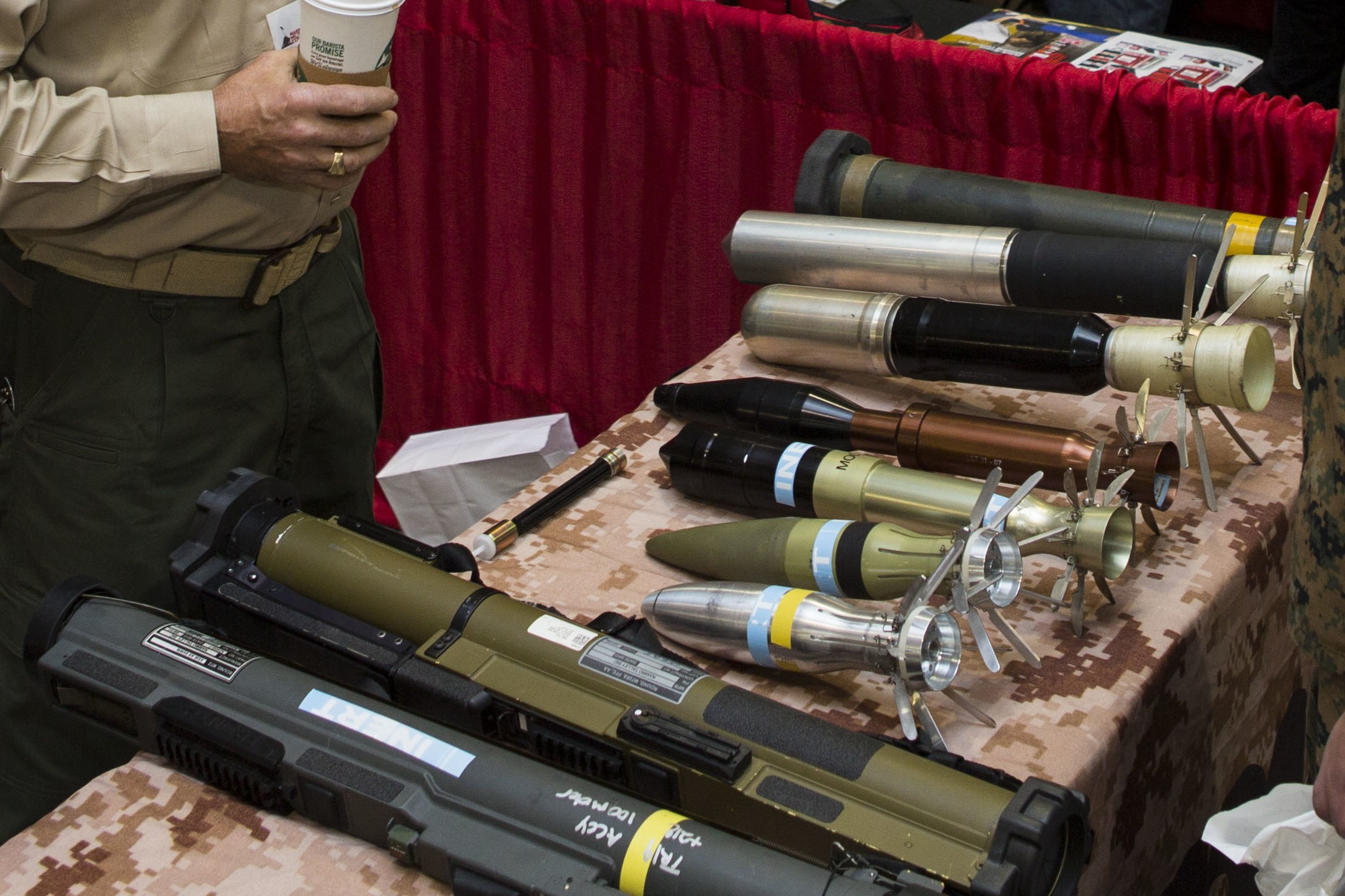
Left to right: M72A9, M72E8, M72E10 projectile, M72E8 projectile, M72A9 rocket, M72A5-A7 rocket, SMAW/M141 HEDM rocket, SMAW-NE rocket, and SMAW rocket encasement. (above the M72E8 projectile is the 21mm training projectile for the M72AS)

Variant	ref	Armor Penetration mm (in)	Muzzle Velocity m/s (ft/s)
M72/A1		200 (7.87)	145 (476)
M72A2/A3		300 (11.81)	145 (476)
M72A4		350 (13.78)	200 (656)
M72A5		300 (11.81)	200 (656)
M72A6/A7		150 (5.91)	200 (656)
M72A8		150 (5.91)	166 (545)
M72A9		N/AAn anti-structure munition without a shaped charge	130 (427)
M72A10		N/A	166 (545)
M72 EC Mk.1		450 (17.72)	200 (656)
M72 EC Mk.2		300 (11.81)	200 (656)

== Specifications (M72A2 and M72A3) ==
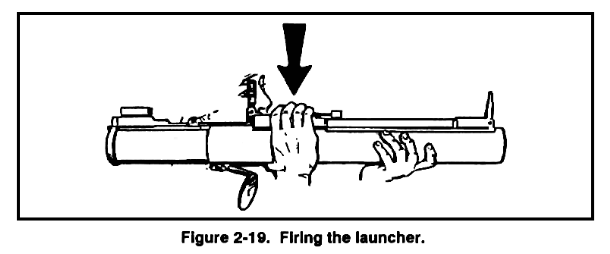
Firing the M72 LAW

=== Launcher ===
- Length:
  - Extended: less than 1 m (39 in)
  - Closed: 0.67 m (26 in)
- Weight:
  - Complete M72A2: 2.3 kg (5.1 lb)
  - Complete M72A3: 2.5 kg (5.5 lb)
- Firing mechanism: percussion.
- Front sight: reticle graduated in 25 m range increments
- Rear sight: peep sight adjusts automatically to temperature change

=== Rocket ===
- Caliber: 66 mm (2.6 in)
- Length: 508 mm (20.0 in)
- Weight: 1.0 kg (2.2 lb)
- Muzzle velocity: 145 m/s (480 ft/s)
- Minimum range (combat): 10 m (33 ft)
- Minimum arming range: 10 m (33 ft)
- Maximum range: 1,000 m (3,300 ft)
- Penetration: 300 mm (12 in)

=== Maximum effective ranges ===
- Stationary target: 200 m (220 yd)
- Moving target: 165 m (180 yd)
- Beyond these ranges there is less than a 50% chance of hitting the target.

== Operators ==
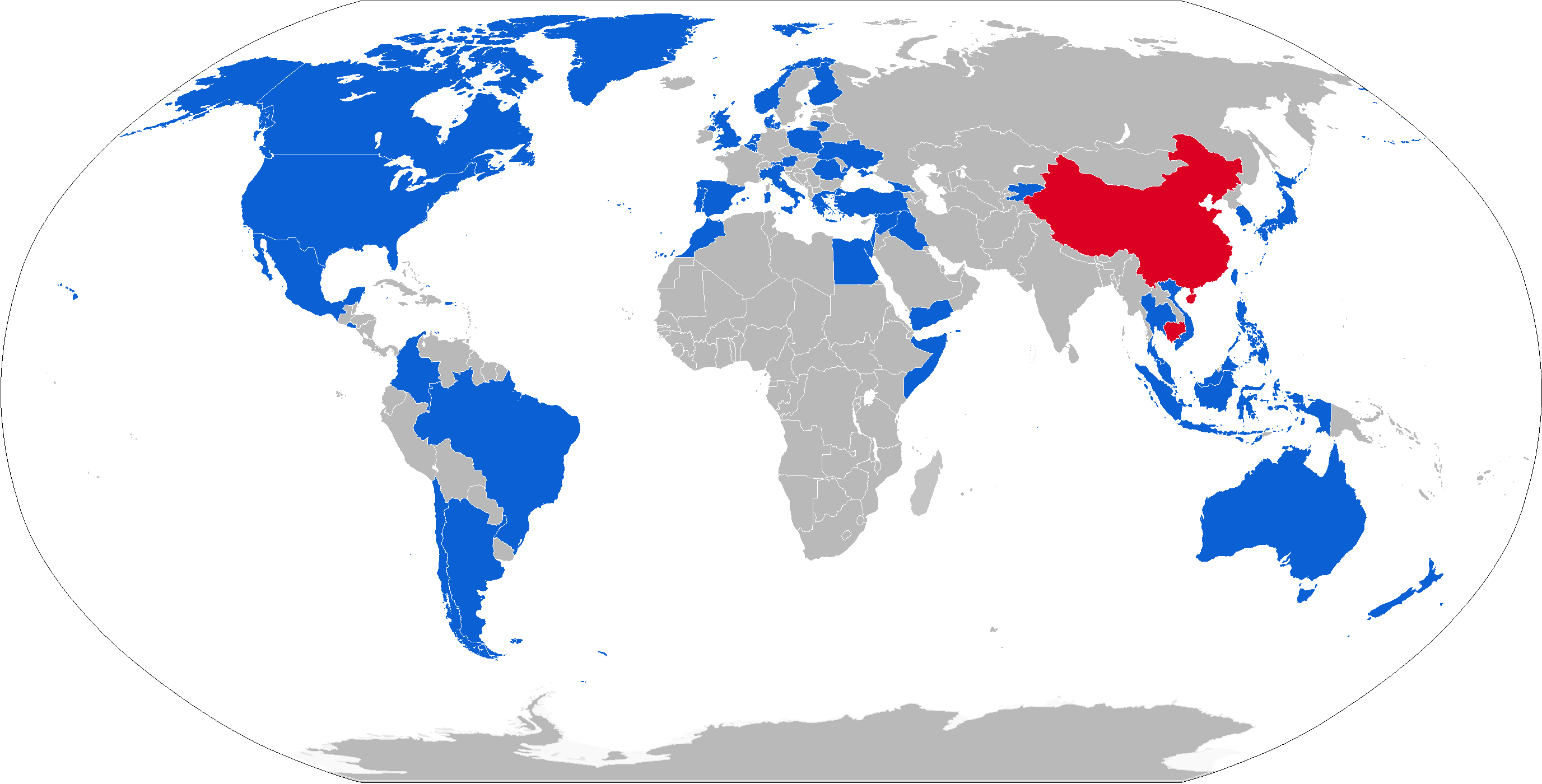
M72 operators Current Former

=== Current operators ===
- Argentina: M72A3 variant
- Australia: M72A6 variant
- Austria
- Belgium
- Brazil: M72A2 variant used by Brazilian Navy.
- Canada M72A5 variant, labeled as M72A5-C1
- Colombia M72A3 variant.
- Chile: M72A3 variant. Used by the Chilean Army and the Chilean Marine Corps. New variant used by the latter force reported in 2018.
- Cyprus
- Denmark: M72A7 variant, since 2018 M72 EC
- Egypt
- El Salvador
- Israel
- Italy: M72A5 variant since 2007
- Japan: Used by the Japanese Ground Self-Defense Force.
- Finland
- France: Used by the GIGN.
- Georgia
- Greece
- Iraq
- Kosovo:
- Kyrgyzstan: The weapon was shown during new military equipment presentation recently which were sent with Turkey's official representative to hand them Kyrgyz officials.
- Luxembourg
- Lithuania: Lithuanian National Defence Volunteer Forces
- Malaysia: M72 in service since 2015. 800 additional units (MKE HAR-66) ordered in 2024.
- Mexico: First seen in September 2018
- Morocco
- Netherlands
- New Zealand
- Norway
- Philippines
- Poland: On July 7, 2022, Deputy Prime Minister and Minister of National Defense Mariusz Błaszczak announced the delivery of several thousand M72 EC MK1s.
- Portugal
- Romania
- Somalia
- Somaliland
- South Korea
- Spain: M72A3 variant.
- Syria: Captured from rebel groups.
  - (Syrian opposition) Free Syrian Army
- Taiwan
- Thailand
- Turkey
- Ukraine: delivered to Ukraine by Canadian, Danish and Norwegian Armed Forces (and possibly several others), as part of the military aid during the 2022 Russian Invasion.
- United Kingdom: Used by the British Army from the 1970s to the early 1990s. The M72A9 variant was reintroduced into service for the Afghanistan war. due to its light weight, lower cost and greater portability.
- United States
- Yemen
- Vietnam

=== Former users ===
- FNLA
- Cambodia
- China: launchers captured and used in Sino-Vietnamese War and Sino-Vietnamese conflicts, replaced by the PF-89, PF-98 and DZJ-08 anti-tank grenade launcher.
- South Vietnam

== See also ==
- Mk 153 Shoulder-Launched Multipurpose Assault Weapon
- List of U.S. Army rocket launchers

=== Similar weapons ===
- C90-CR (M3) – (Spain)
- M80 Zolja – (Socialist Federal Republic of Yugoslavia)
- Panzerfaust 3 – (West Germany)
- RPG-18 / RPG-22 / RPG-26 – (Soviet Union)
- RPG-76 Komar – (Polish People's Republic, Poland)
