= APILAS =

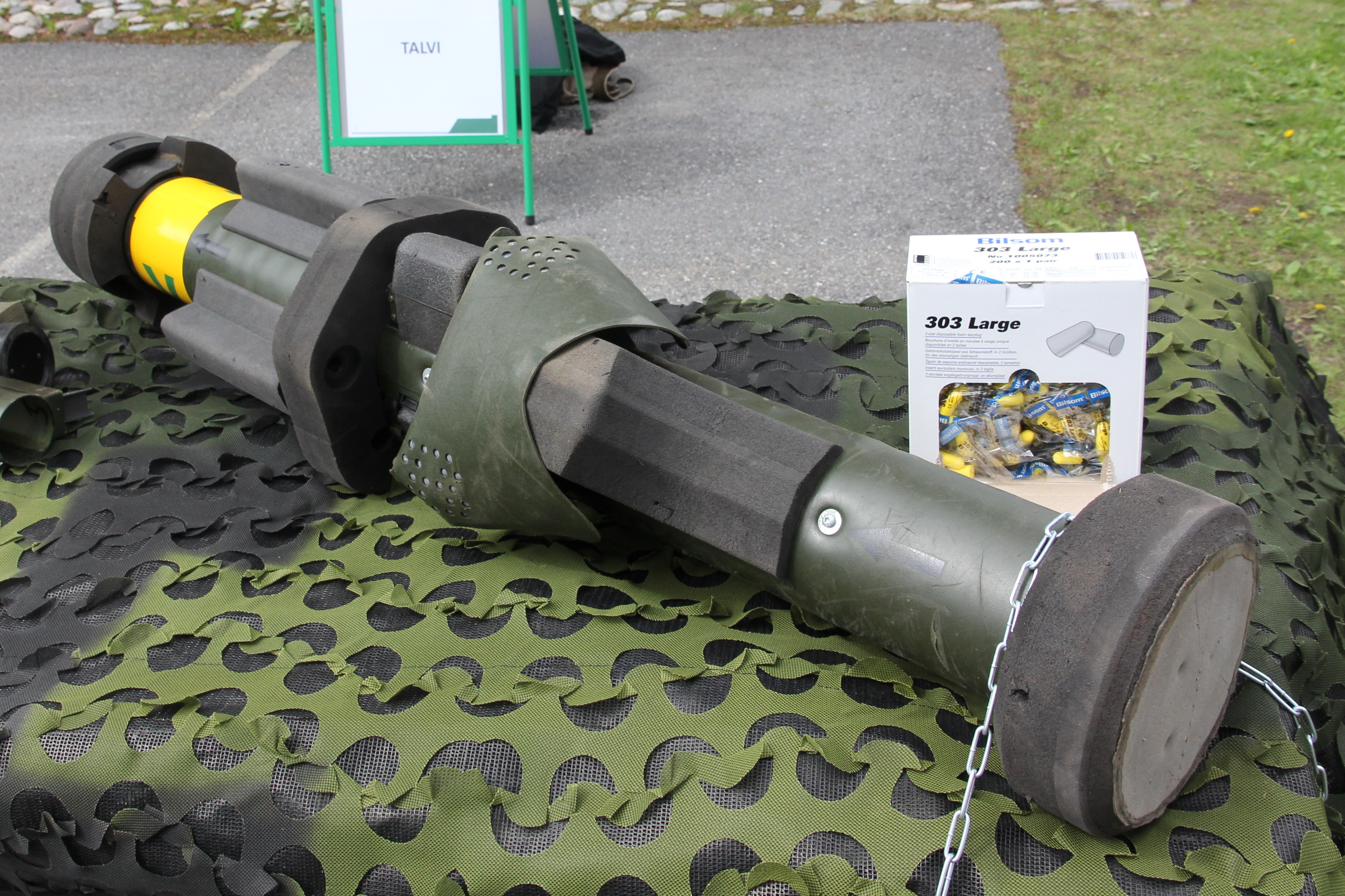
- The APILAS on display at the 2014 Flag Day event, sponsored by the Finnish military.
- Type: Anti-tank weapon
- Place of origin: France

Service history
- In service: 1985-present
- Used by: See Operators
- Wars: South African Border War; Gulf War; Syrian Civil War

Production history
- Designer: GIAT Industries
- Manufacturer: GIAT Industries
- Unit cost: €2,000
- Produced: 1985-2006
- No. built: 120,000

Specifications
- Mass: 9 kg (19.84 lb)
- Length: 1,300 mm (51.2 in)
- Barrel length: 180 mm (7.1 in)
- Caliber: 112 mm (4.4 in)
- Muzzle velocity: 293 m/s (961 ft/s)
- Effective firing range: 25–350 m
- Maximum firing range: 500 m

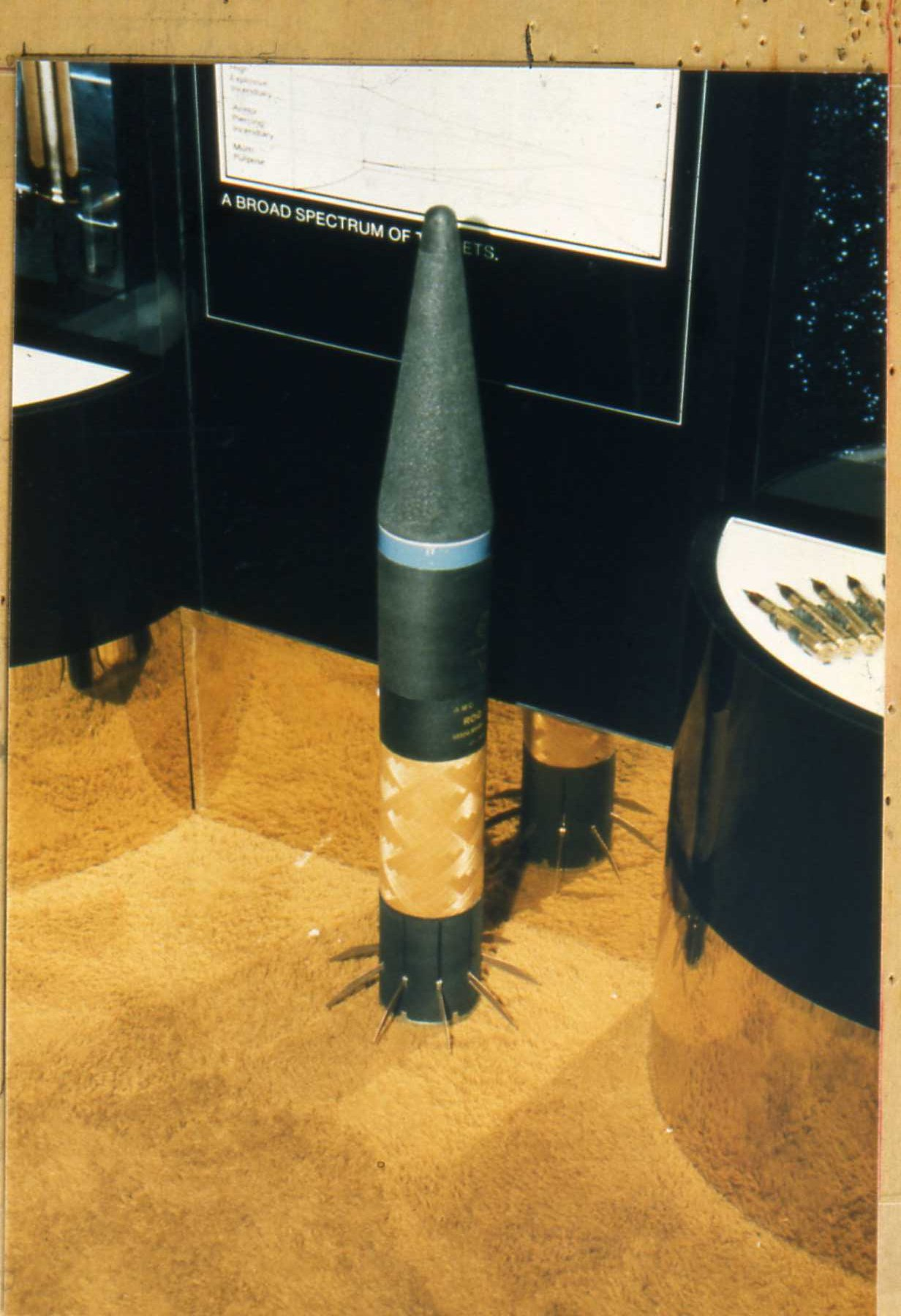
APILAS antitank rocket projectile

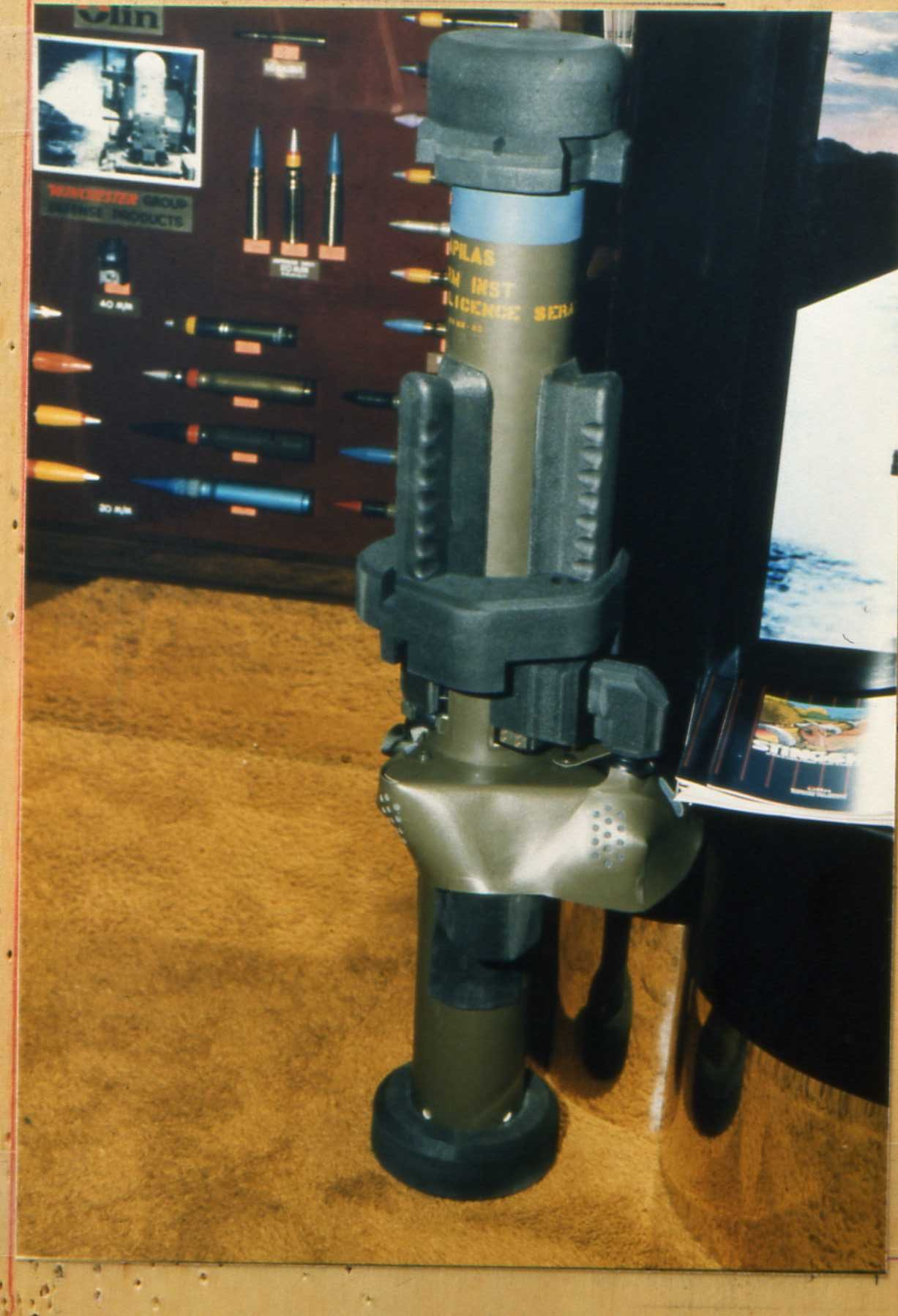
APILAS launcher

External images
- APILAS - 1983 1st Version
- APILAS and soldier 1
- APILAS and soldier 2
- APILAS and soldier 3
- APILAS and soldier 4
- APILAS launcher and rocket
- APILAS rocket projectile

The RAC 112 APILAS (French: Roquette AntiChar, lit. 'anti-tank rocket'); lit. 'Armour-Piercing Infantry Light Arm System') is a portable one-shot 112 mm recoilless anti-tank rocket launcher, designed in France by GIAT Industries. Over 120,000 of the APILAS launchers have been produced, and they are in service with many countries.

== History ==
84,000 were ordered in 1984 by the French Army to replace the LRAC F1 until the adoption of the Eryx short-range missile. The French company Matra Manurhin Défense (now NEXTER - ex GIAT) produced 120,000 APILAS between 1985 and 2006.

== Design ==
The APILAS is supplied in an aramid fibre launcher tube with a retractable sight. The effective range of APILAS is from 25 m (it takes 25 m for the rocket to arm itself) up to 300–500 m depending on the target. The shaped charge warhead is electrically fused and will detonate at impact angles up to 80 degrees.

Although heavy, the APILAS is able to pierce 700 mm of RHA. Within the French Army it is categorized as "traumatic weapon", because of its blast and noise. A French soldier cannot fire it more than three times in his service during peacetime.

An off-route mine system was developed using the APILAS rocket mounted on a tripod using a sensor package, or tripwires.

== Operators ==
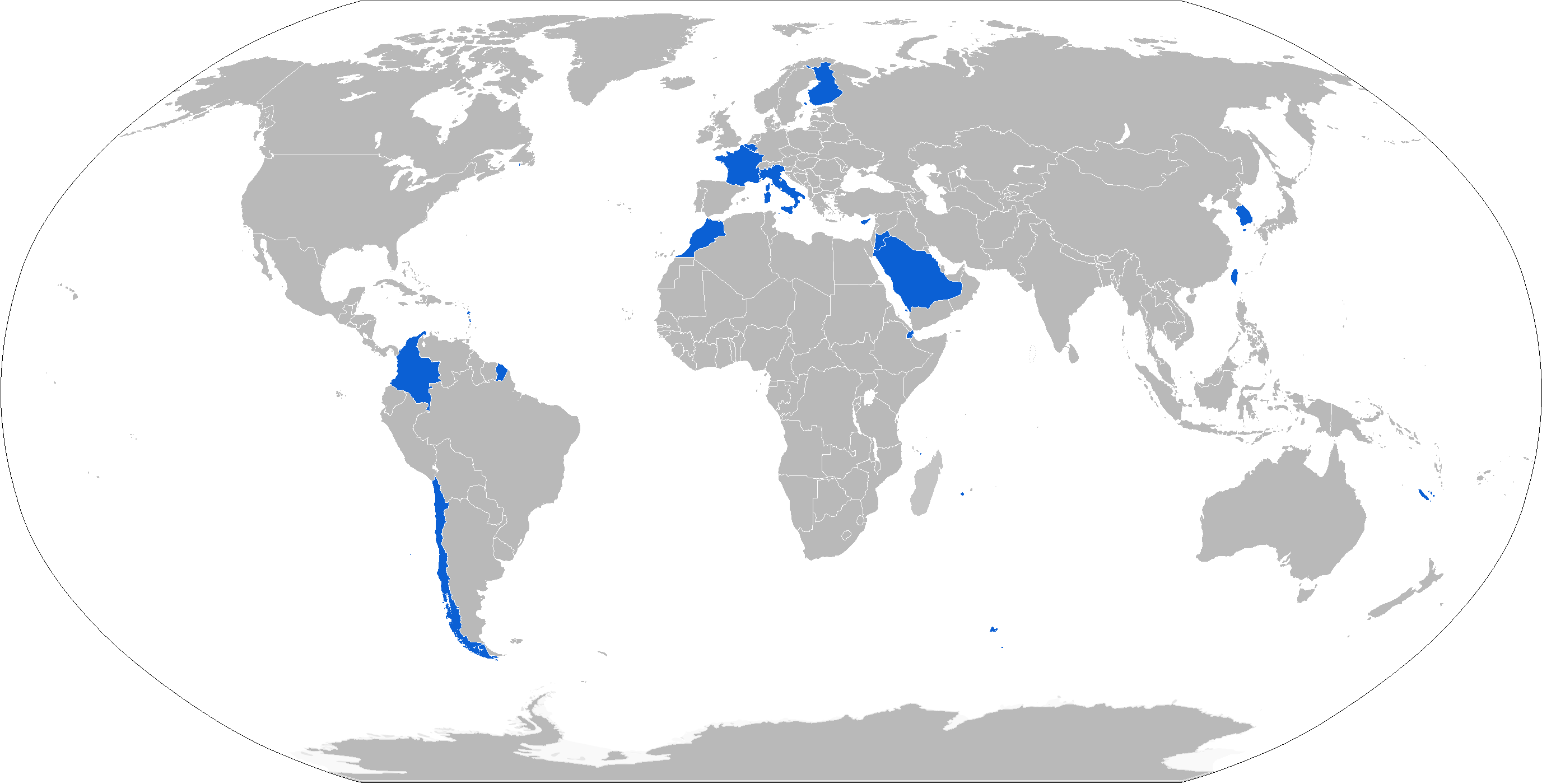
Map with APILAS operators in blue

- Belgium
- Chad
- Chile
- Colombia
- Cyprus
- Djibouti
- Finland
- France
- Italy
- Jordan
- Morocco
- Saudi Arabia
- South Africa
- South Korea
- Spain
- Syria:
  - Syrian Arab Army
  - Free Syrian Army
- Taiwan
- Ukraine

=== Former operators ===
- Republic of South Africa
- (South Africa) South West Africa

== See also ==
- LRAC F1 – (France)
- Eryx – (France)
- LAW 80 – (United Kingdom)
- AT4 – (Sweden)
- C-100 – (Spain)
- Kestrel – (Taiwan)

== Sources ==
- Jane's Infantry Weapons 2005–2006
- Jane's Mines and Mine Clearance 2005–2006
