= DZJ-08 =

Type 08 Individual Multipurpose Assault Weapon System
- Type: Multi-role (anti-armor, anti-fortification, anti-personnel) assault weapon
- Place of origin: China

Service history
- In service: 2008–present
- Used by: See Users

Production history
- Designer: China North Industries Group Corporation
- Designed: 2000
- Manufacturer: Norinco

Specifications
- Mass: Total: 7.6 kg (17 lb)
- Length: 971 mm (3 ft 2.2 in)
- Crew: 1 (single-use, disposable)
- Cartridge: 80×428 mm
- Cartridge weight: 1.65 kg (3.6 lb) (Standard Multipurpose)
- Caliber: 80 mm (3.1 in)
- Rate of fire: 5-7 rounds per minute
- Muzzle velocity: 172 m/s (560 ft/s)
- Effective firing range: 25 m (82 ft) to 200 m (660 ft)
- Maximum firing range: 300 m (980 ft)
- Feed system: single-use
- Sights: optical 1×/3× day sight

The DZJ-08 (Chinese: 08式80毫米单兵多用途攻坚弹系统; pinyin: 08 Shì 80 háomǐ dān bīng duō yòngtú gōngjiān dàn xìtǒng; lit. 'Type 08 80 millimetre Individual Multipurpose Assault Ammunition System') is a portable, disposable, unguided, shoulder-launched, multipurpose recoilless weapon designed and manufactured by Norinco.

== History ==
China used the Type 89 rocket launcher to replace the Type 69 RPG in the 90s, however the problem of back blast became prominent.

Since May 2000, Norinco started design of a new generation of mass produced weapon that is portable, single-use and can be distributed to each individual soldier of an infantry squad like the Type 89, yet offer low collateral damage.

== Design ==
The Type 08 is China's first attempt to develop an anti-tank weapon that can be used in confined spaces and urban warfare, both by soldiers and robot wolves.

The weapon is designed as a multi-role assault weapon aiming to provide anti-armor, anti-fortification, anti-personnel and fire-and-forget capability.

The DZJ-08 weighs 7.6kg, is water-proof, and features a foldable day sight. The weapon also has a folding front grip and carrying handle. Firing instructions are printed on the left side of the launch tube.

=== Operation ===
The Type 08 has a unique firing mechanism called sealed balance projection (Chinese: 密闭式平衡抛射, romanized: Mìbì shì pínghéng pāoshè) possibly inspired by C.Davis recoilless principle.

Compared to the previous system, the Type 08 utilizes countermass to reduce the recoil, noise, muzzle flash, pressure wave and back blast that can cause burns and overpressure as well as create conspicuous launch signature of the user.

=== Ammunition ===
Type 08's multipurpose ammunition has a relatively small blast radius of 7 meters, which gives the weapon system a minimum range of 25 meters. Thus, a soldier can fire the weapon more safely inside confined spaces.

The high-explosive ammunition of the DZJ-08 is specially designed to penetrate structures. The warhead contains magnesium and thermite. It can penetrates 25 mm of steel armor at 65° angle, or around 30 mm of steel armor at 0° angle.

==== Effectiveness ====
Although it is not effective against heavy vehicles, the DJZ-08 can still penetrate and destroy lightly armored vehicles like armored personnel carriers.

The biggest improvement of DZJ-08 is the ability to penetrate 500 mm of reinforced concrete, whereas the predecessor PF-89A with its multipurpose round can only penetrate 300mm of reinforced concrete.

== Variants ==
The DZJ-08 has several variants, with each variant corresponding to a specific type of ammunition.

=== DZJ-08 Multipurpose Assault Munition ===
The DZJ-08 Multipurpose Assault Munition (Chinese: 08式多用途攻坚弹) is the original variant with multipurpose bunker buster warhead.

=== DZA-11 Penetrative Fragmentation Munition ===
The DZA-11 Penetrative Fragmentation Munition (Chinese: 11式侵彻杀伤弹) is a penetrator warhead variant with secondary high-explosive fragmentation fillings.

=== DZP-11 High-Explosive Anti-Tank Munition ===
The DZP-11 High-Explosive Anti-Tank Munition (Chinese: 11式破甲弹) is a tandem armor-piercing high-explosive anti-tank warhead.

=== DNS-181 Programmable Air-Burst Munition ===
The DNS-181 Programmable Air-Burst Munition (Chinese: 181式可编程空爆弹) is a programmable air-burst high explosive fragmentation warhead.

A fire control unit, likely designated DRU-181, featuring a keyboard and a digital display, is attached to the forward position of the launcher.

== Users ==
- China
  - People's Liberation Army

== See also ==
- MRO-A – (Russia)
- M72 LAW – (United States)
- AT4 – (Sweden)
- Armbrust – (West Germany)
- PF-89 – (China)
- Davis gun – (United States)
- Panzerfaust 3 – (West Germany)
- Recoilless gun
