= PF-89 =

Anti-tank, anti-bunker rocket launcher

Type 89 Individual Anti-tank Rocket
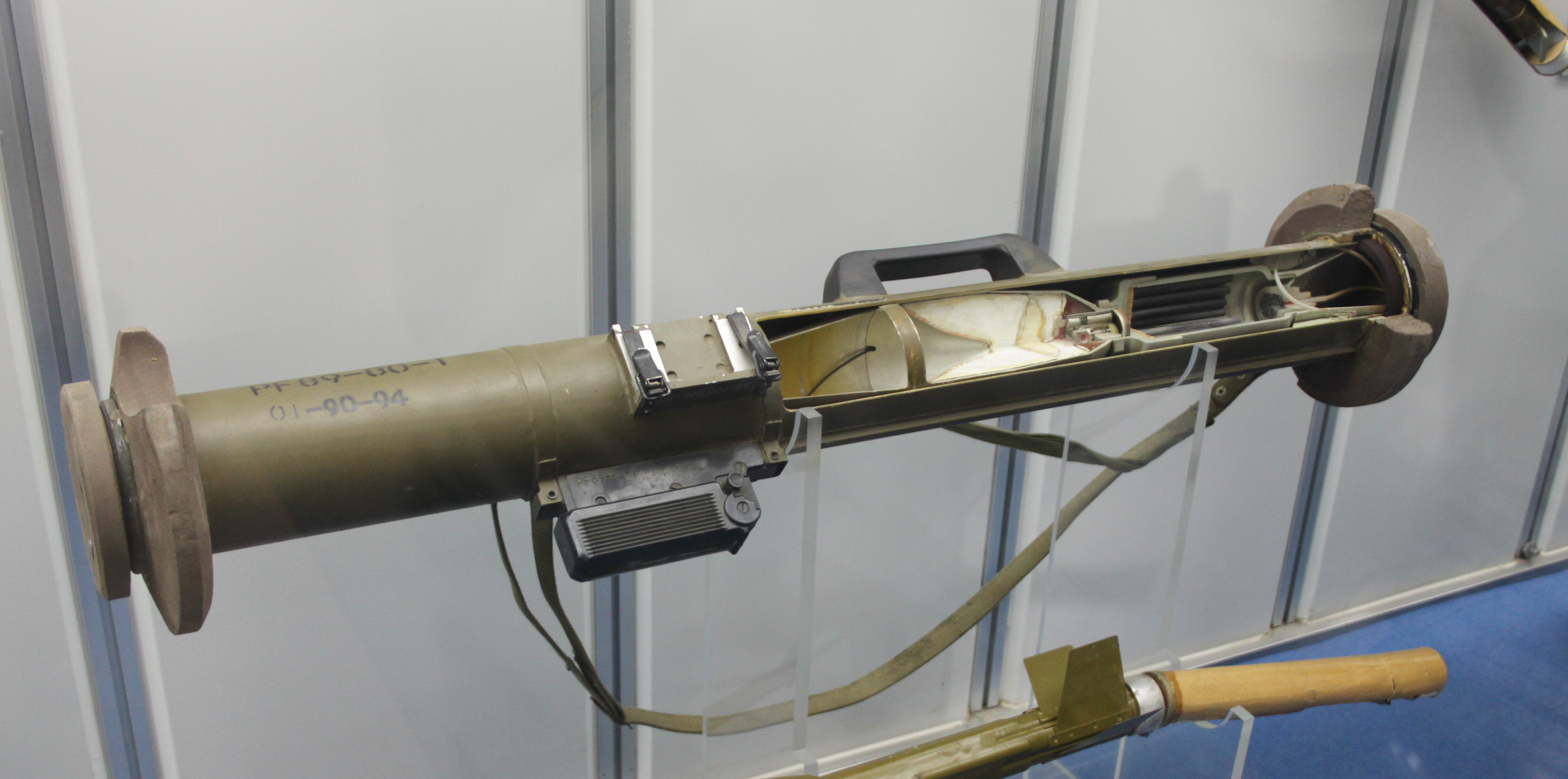
- A dissected PF-89 rocket launcher on display at the China People's Revolution Military Museum in Beijing.
- Type: Anti-tank, anti-bunker
- Place of origin: China

Service history
- In service: 1993–present
- Used by: See Users

Production history
- Designer: China North Industries Group Corporation
- Designed: 1980s
- Manufacturer: Norinco
- Produced: 1989

Specifications
- Mass: Total: 3.7 kg (8.2 lb)
- Length: 900 mm (2 ft 11 in)
- Crew: 1 (single-use, disposable)
- Cartridge: 80×900 mm rocket-assist grenade
- Cartridge weight: 1.84 kg (4.1 lb)
- Caliber: 80 mm (3.1 in)
- Action: Single-shot
- Muzzle velocity: 147 m/s (480 ft/s)
- Effective firing range: 100 m (330 ft) to 250 m (820 ft)
- Maximum firing range: 400 m (1,300 ft)
- Sights: Optical 2.5x (day sight)

The PF-89 or Type 89 is a portable, disposable, unguided, shoulder-launched, anti-tank rocket-propelled rocket launcher. Developed by Norinco for the People's Liberation Army (PLA), the PF-89 was designed to replace the obsolete Type 69 RPG, providing a man-portable, single-use assault weapon system that could be used mainly by infantry squads to engage and defeat light armour and bunkers.

Its design permits accurate delivery of a rocket-propelled 80mm high-explosive anti-tank (HEAT) warhead, with negligible recoil. The PF-89 entered mass production in 1993, and generally replaced the Type 69 RPG in the PLA throughout the 1990s. Since 2010, the system has been used along with the more advanced Type 08 recoilless gun.

== Description ==
The PF-89 is a lightweight, self-contained, anti-armour weapon comparable to the Swedish AT4 (U.S. Designation M136). However, unlike the AT4, the PF-89 is a rocket-propelled weapon instead of a recoilless gun, making the PF-89 more similar to the M72 LAW and the RPG-26. The weapon consists of a free-flight, fin-stabilized, rocket-propelled cartridge packed in a one-piece, one-off, fiberglass-wrapped tube.

It is man-portable and is fired from the right shoulder only. The launcher is watertight for ease of transportation and storage. The PF-89 has a simple 2.5x, 12° field of view optical sight for aiming, with no night combat ability.

The user must be able to see and identify the target and estimate the range to it. The round of ammunition is self-contained in a disposable launch tube. The system weighs only eight pounds and can be used effectively with minimal training.

The problem of back blast became prominent after the PF-89's adoption. Collateral damage is especially concerning for the PLA, which uses motorized infantry fighting tactics. To address this, China developed the Type 08 multipurpose recoilless gun with a countermass balance mechanism to replace the PF-89, especially the multipurpose PF89A variant.

== Development ==
The development of the PF-89 was initiated in 1984, and the rocket launcher was certified in 1989, receiving the designation PF-89. By 1993, the launcher entered serial production and large-scale active service within the PLA. Between 1991 and 1993, China developed the PF-89A, a multipurpose incendiary round designed to engage structures, personnel, and light vehicles. PF-89A has a new telescopic sight attached that features a reticle range up to 1000 meters. Between 1994 and 1998, China developed a tandem HEAT version of the rocket for engagement against targets with reactive armour, which received the designation PF-89B.

In 2002, China certified WPF-89-1, a variant with a thermobaric warhead. WPF-89-1 variant has a reusable launcher, which is cumbersome to reload. In the same year, China developed a single-use version called WPF-89-2, with an additional tandem-charged warhead for better thermobaric performance.

== Variants ==
The PF-89 has six variants, with each variant corresponding to a specific type of ammunition. The earliest variant, simply called the PF-89, uses high-explosive double shaped charges (with 8701 explosives) to achieve 628mm of rolled homogeneous armour (RHA) penetration at 90° angle in static tests. In kinetic tests, the RHA penetration is more than 400mm at 0° angle or 180mm at 68° angle.

The second variant, the PF-89A, employs specialized multipurpose incendiary rounds. These multipurpose rounds can penetrate 300mm of reinforced concrete, and release steel fragments and zirconium-based incendiary composition to kill targets and light up wood and fabric upon impact.

The third variant, known as the PF-89B or PF-89-1, uses tandem-charge HEAT warheads to improve penetration against reactive armour.

The WPF-89-1 is the thermobaric version of the PF-89. The WPF-89-1 is reusable, but it did not see much use due to its complex reload process. China developed WPF-89-2, a single-use self-contained version, to replace WPF-89-1. The fuel air explosion (a type of thermobaric reaction) is most effective within confined space, thus, the WPF-89-2 warhead features a tandem charge function, allowing the warhead to penetrate the structure wall or light armour first, then trigger the fuel air explosion within the target space.

A training replica version is also available for operational practice.

PF-89 variants
Designation	PF-89	PF-89A	PF-89B	WPF-89-1	WPF-89-2
Ammo type	High-explosive anti-tank (HEAT)	Multipurpose incendiary	HEAT tandem-charge	Thermobaric	thermobaric tandem-charge
Cartridge diameter (mm)	80	80	80	80	80
Cartridge weight (kg)	1.84	2.35	2.5	>4	>4
Launcher weight (kg)	1.85	1.85	1.85	1.85	1.85
Full mass (kg)	3.7	4.2	4.7	6.5	6.5
Length (mm)	900	900	900	900	900
Length w/o cover (mm)	880	880	880	880	880
Zeroing	200 m (660 ft)	180 m (590 ft)	N/A	N/A	N/A
Sight range	400 m (1,300 ft)	1,000 m (3,300 ft)	N/A	850 m (2,790 ft)	850 m (2,790 ft)
Penetration	628 mm/90° >400 mm/0° 180 mm/65°	20 mm/65°	Higher than PF-89	N/A	N/A
Velocity	147 m/s (480 ft/s)	147 m/s (480 ft/s)	140 m/s (460 ft/s)	120 m/s (390 ft/s)	120 m/s (390 ft/s)
Arming distance		25 m (82 ft)		25 m (82 ft)	25 m (82 ft)

== Users ==
- Cambodia: Used by the Royal Cambodian Army.
- China: Used by the People's Liberation Army.

=== Non-state actors ===
- Libya: WPF-89-2s used by Fajr Libya.

== See also ==
- PF-98 – (China)
- DZJ-08 – (China)
- M72 LAW – (United States)
- AT4 – (Sweden)
- RPG-26 – (Soviet Union)
- Kestrel – (Taiwan)
