= Niewiadów =

- Village
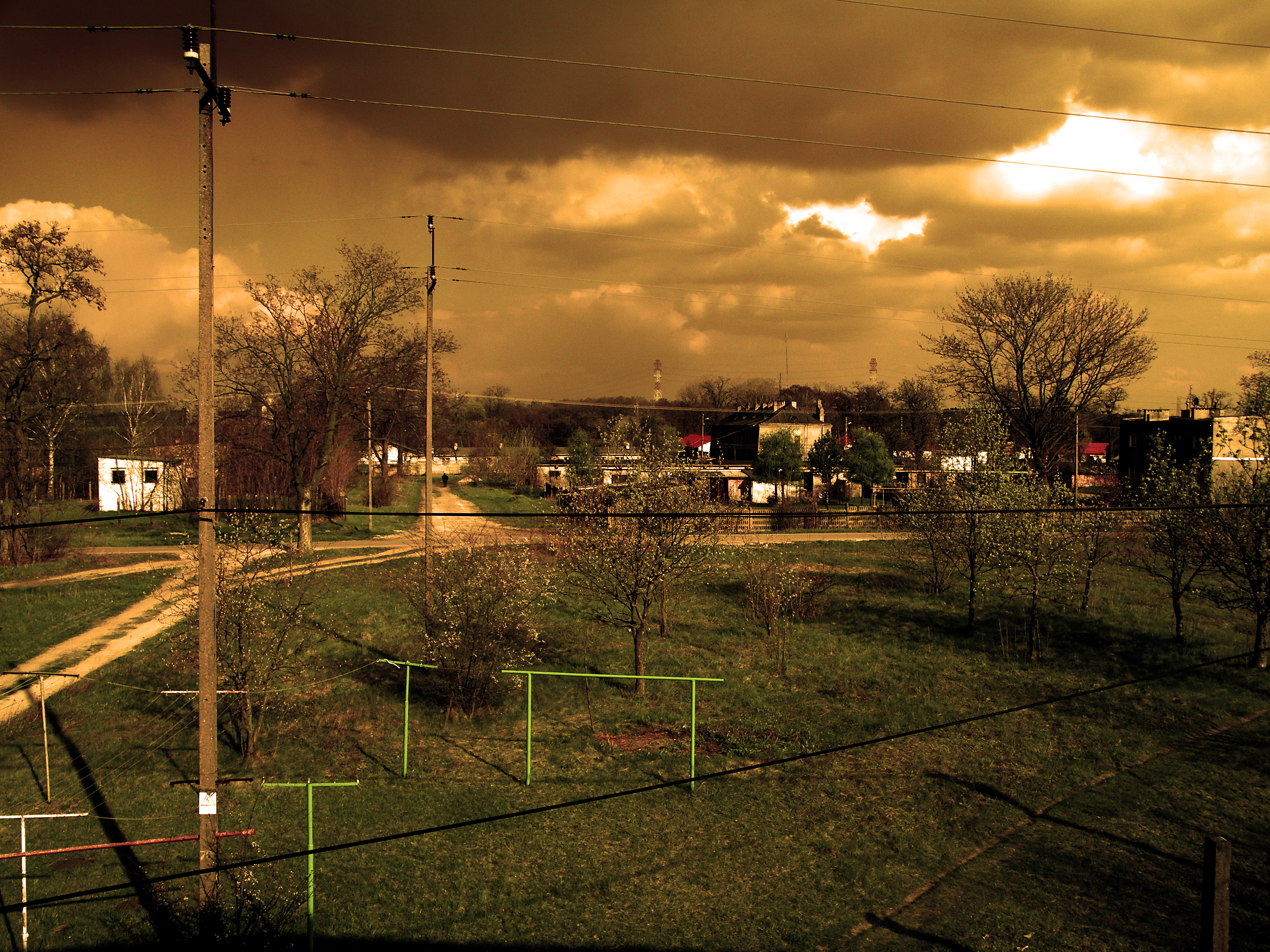

- Location within Poland
- Coordinates: 51°37′4″N 19°54′31″E
- Country: Poland
- Voivodeship: Łódź
- County: Tomaszów
- Gmina: Ujazd
- Population: 2,800

Niewiadów [ɲɛˈvjaduf] is a village in the administrative district of Gmina Ujazd, within Tomaszów County, Łódź Voivodeship, in central Poland.
