= RPG-7 =

Soviet man-portable anti-tank rocket launcher

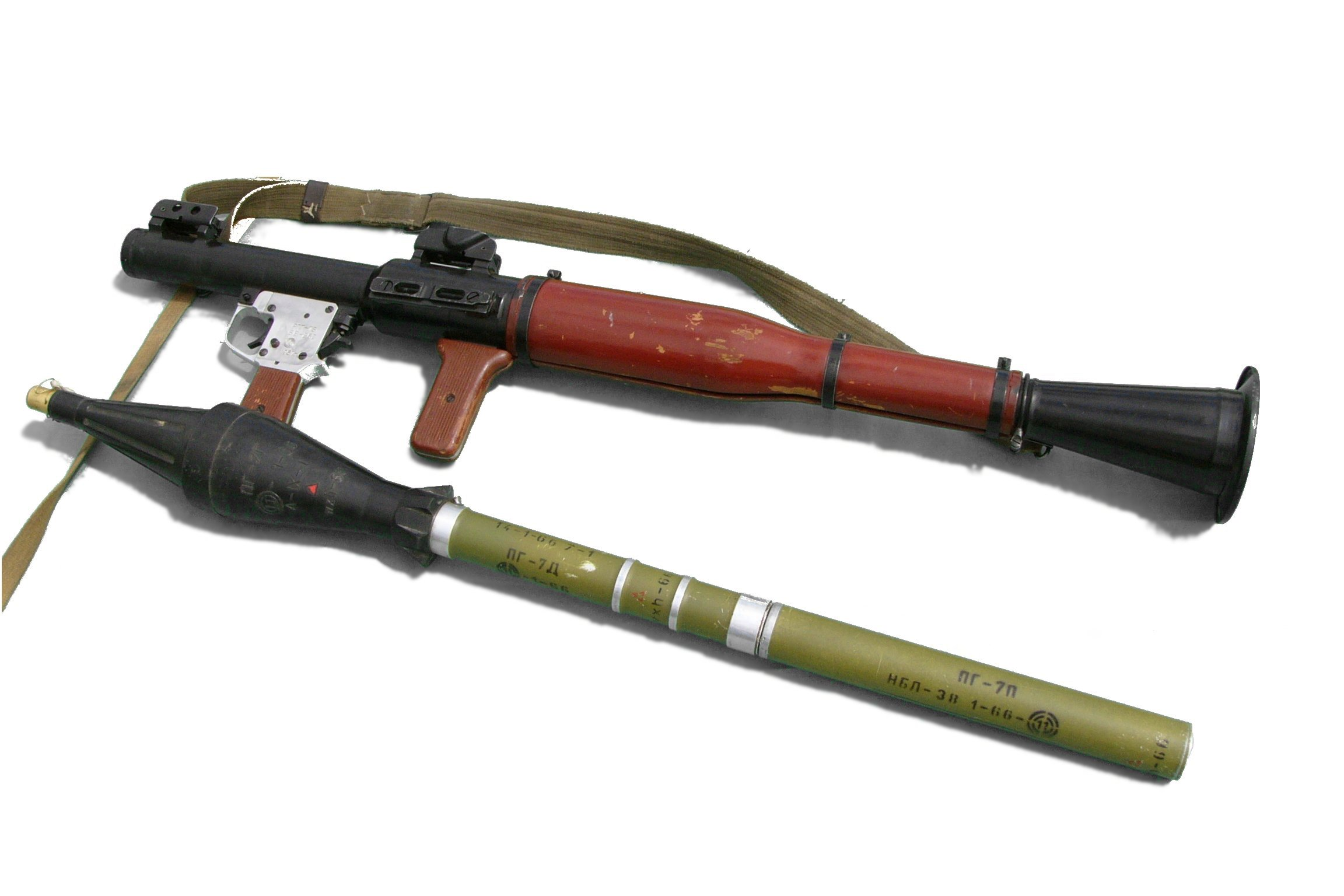
- An RPG-7 launcher (top) with a Bulgarian RPG-7G inert training warhead and booster (bottom)
- Type: Hand-held rocket launcher
- Place of origin: Soviet Union

Service history
- In service: 1961–present
- Used by: See Users
- Wars: See Conflicts

Production history
- Designer: Bazalt
- Designed: 1958
- Manufacturer: Bazalt and Degtyarev plant (Russia)
- Unit cost: c. US$350
- Produced: 1958–present
- No. built: 9,000,000+
- Variants: RPG-7V2 (current model); RPG-7D3 (paratrooper); Type 69 RPG (China); PSRL-1 (Airtronic USA)

Specifications
- Mass: 6.3 kg (13.9 lb) (without a telescopic sight); 7 kg (15.4 lb) (with PGO-7)
- Length: 950 mm (37.4 in)
- Cartridge: 85 mm (3.3 in)
- Caliber: 40 mm (1.6 in)
- Muzzle velocity: 115 m/s (380 ft/s) (boost); 300 m/s (980 ft/s) (flight)
- Effective firing range: 330 m (1,080 ft) (PG-7V)
- Maximum firing range: 700 m (2,300 ft) (OG-7V) (self detonates at c. 920 m (3,020 ft))
- Sights: PGO-7 (2.7×), UP-7V telescopic sight and 1PN51/1PN58 night vision sights; Red dot reflex sight

The RPG-7 (Note: Russian: РПГ-7, Ручной Противотанковый Гранатомёт, romanized: Ruchnoy Protivotankovyy Granatomyot, lit. 'Hand-held Anti-Tank Grenade Launcher') is a portable, reusable, unguided, shoulder-launched anti-tank rocket launcher. The RPG-7 and its predecessor, the RPG-2, were designed by the Soviet Union, and are manufactured by the Russian company NPO Bazalt. The weapon has the GRAU index 6G3 (6Г3).

The ruggedness, simplicity, low cost, and effectiveness of the RPG-7 have made it the most widely used anti-armor weapon in the world. Roughly 40 countries use the weapon; it is manufactured in several variants by nine countries. It is popular with irregular and guerrilla forces.

Widely produced, the most commonly seen major variations are the RPG-7D (Russian: РПГ-7Д, which stands for десантник, desantnik, 'paratrooper') model, which can be broken into two parts for easier carrying; and the lighter Chinese Type 69 RPG. DIO of Iran manufactures RPG-7s with olive green handguards, H&K style pistol grips, and a commando variant.

The RPG-7 was first delivered to the Soviet Army in 1961 and deployed at the squad level. It replaced the RPG-2, having clearly out-performed the intermediate RPG-4 design during testing. Russia produces the RPG-7V2, capable of firing standard and dual high-explosive anti-tank (HEAT) rounds, high explosive/fragmentation, and thermobaric warheads, with a UP-7V sighting device fitted (used in tandem with the standard 2.7× PGO-7 optical sight) to allow the use of extended range ammunition. The RPG-7D3 is the equivalent paratrooper model. Both the RPG-7V2 and RPG-7D3 were adopted by the Russian Ground Forces in 2001.

== Description ==
The launcher is reloadable and based on a steel tube, 40 mm (1.6 in) in diameter, 950 mm (37 in) long, and weighing 7 kg (15 lb). The middle of the tube is wood wrapped to protect the user from heat and the end is flared. Sighting is usually optical with a back-up iron sight, and passive infrared and night sights are also available. The launchers designated RPG-7N1 and RPG-7DN1 can thus mount the multi-purpose night vision scope 1PN51 and the launchers designated RPG-7N2 and RPG-7DN2 can mount the multi-purpose night vision scope 1PN58.

As with similar weapons, the grenade protrudes from the launch tubes. It is 40–105 mm (1.6–4.1 in) in diameter and weighs between 2 kg (4.4 lb) and 4.5 kg (9.9 lb). It is launched by a gunpowder booster charge, giving it an initial speed of 115 m/s (380 ft/s), and creating a cloud of light grey-blue smoke that can give away the position of the shooter. The rocket motor (Note: no rocket motors in OG-7V) ignites after 10 m (33 ft) and sustains flight out to 500 m (1,600 ft) at a maximum velocity of 295 m/s (970 ft/s). The grenade is stabilized by two sets of fins that deploy in-flight: one large set on the stabilizer pipe to maintain direction and a smaller rear set to induce rotation. The grenade can fly up to 1,100 m (3,600 ft); the fuze sets the maximum range, usually 920 m (3,020 ft).

=== Propulsion system ===
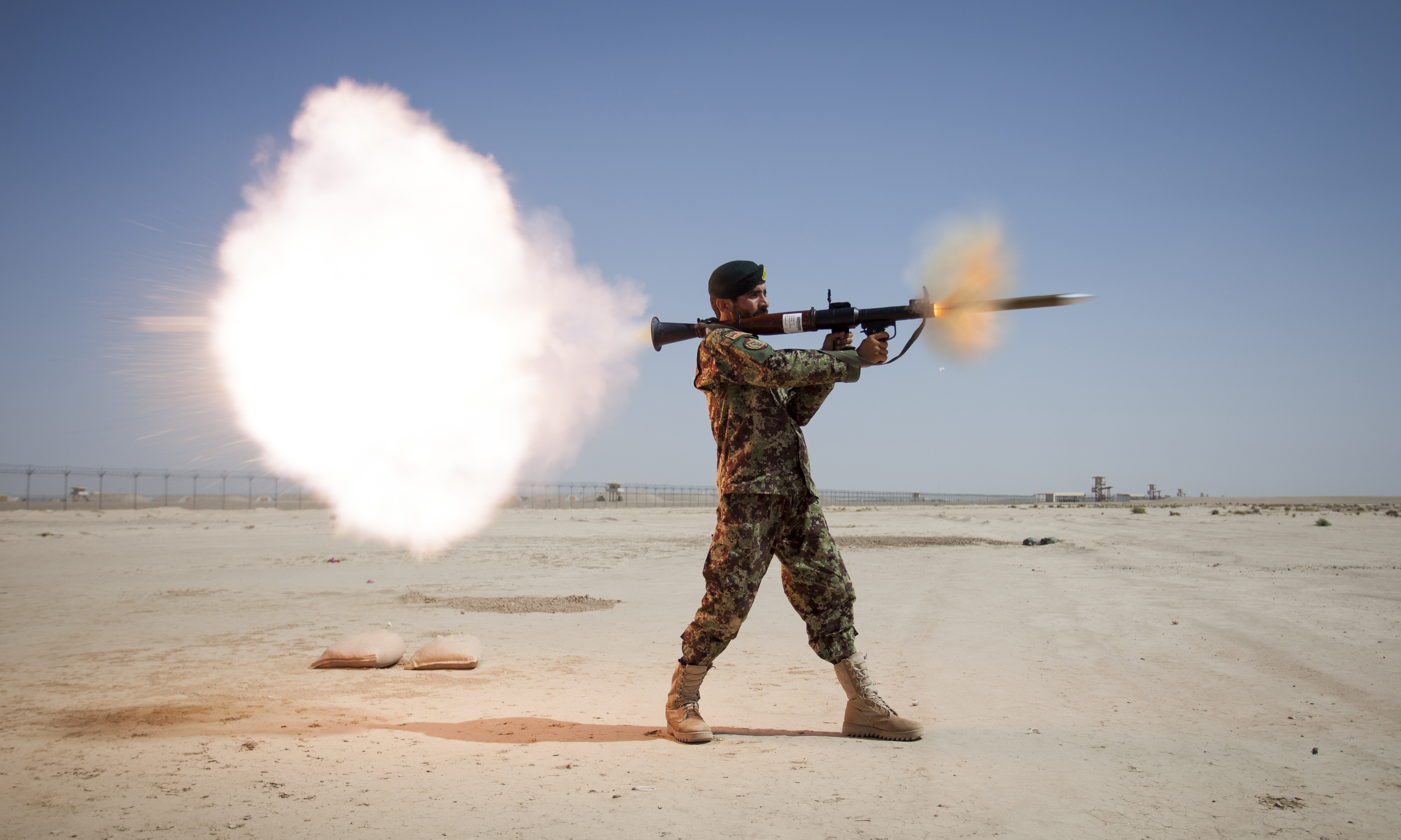
An Afghan National Army soldier firing an RPG-7, 2013

According to the United States Army Training and Doctrine Command (TRADOC) Bulletin 3u (1977) Soviet RPG-7 Antitank Grenade Launcher—Capabilities and Countermeasures, the RPG-7 munition has two sections: a "booster" section and a "warhead and sustainer motor" section. These must be assembled into the ready-to-use grenade. The booster consists of a "small strip powder charge" that serves to propel the grenade out of the launcher; the sustainer motor then ignites and propels the grenade for the next few seconds, giving it a top speed of 294 m/s (960 ft/s). The TRADOC bulletin provides anecdotal commentary that the RPG-7 has been fired from within buildings, which agrees with the two-stage design. It is stated that only a 2 metres (6.6 feet) standoff to a rear obstruction is needed for use inside rooms or fortifications. The fins not only provide drag stabilization, but are designed to impart a slow rotation to the grenade.

Due to the configuration of the RPG-7 sustainer/warhead section, it responds counter-intuitively to crosswinds. A crosswind will tend to exert pressure on the stabilizing fins, causing the projectile to turn into the wind (see Weathervane effect). While the rocket motor is still burning, this will cause the flight path to curve into the wind. The TRADOC bulletin explains aiming difficulties for more distant moving targets in crosswinds at some length.

== Variants ==
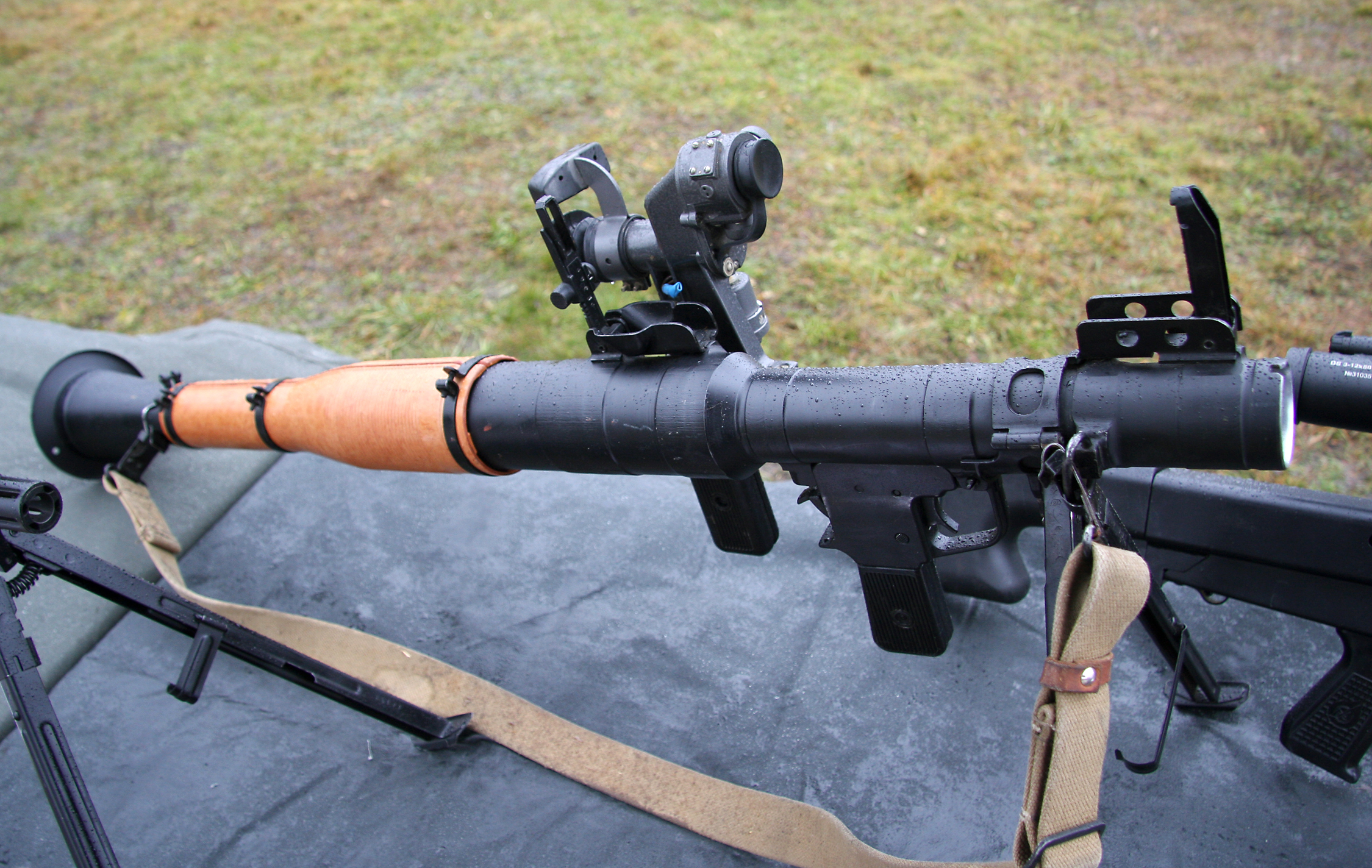
RPG-7V

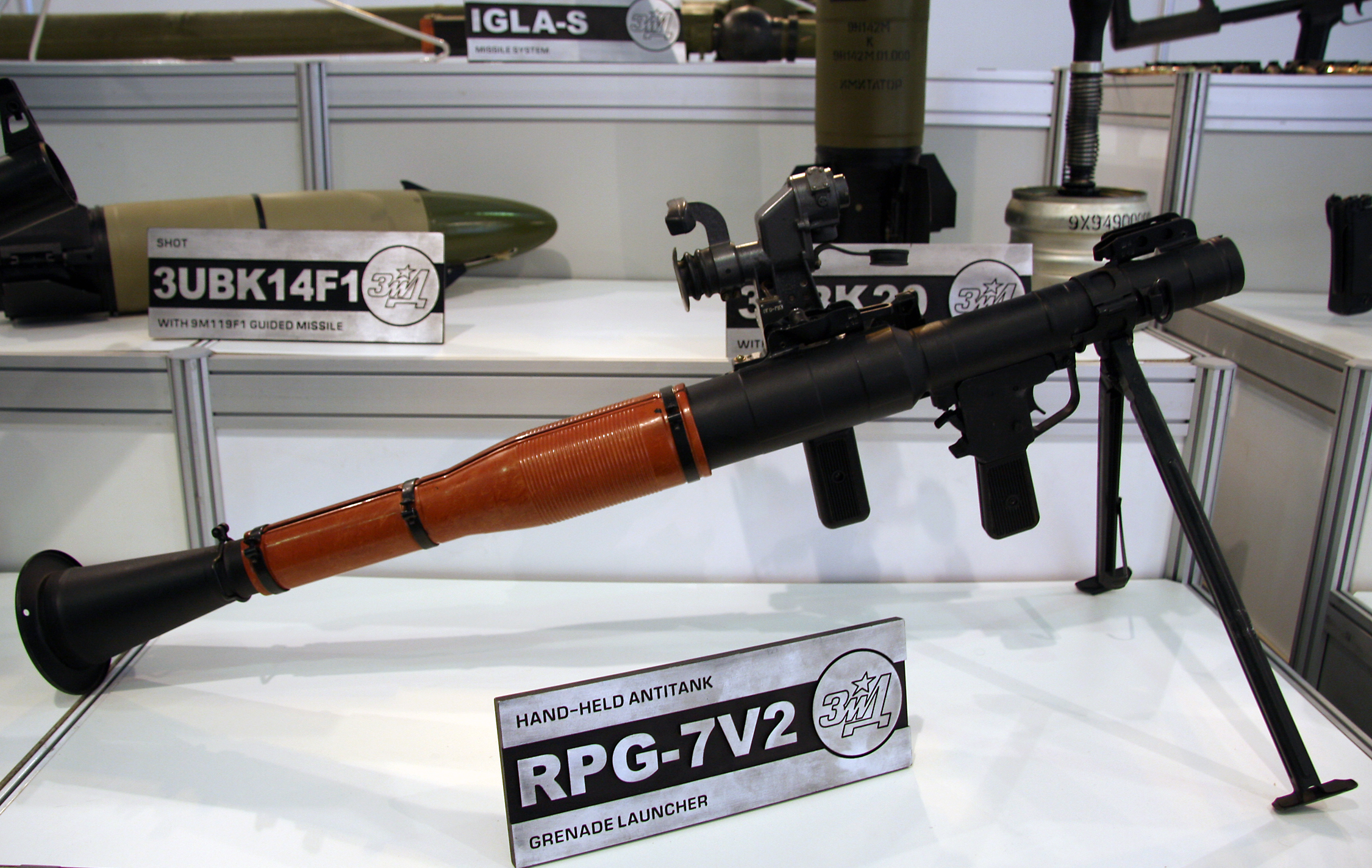
RPG-7V2

Based on the standard RPG-7, a lightweight airborne version with a detachable barrel was developed, along with a series of modifications differing in sighting systems:

RPG-7 (GRAU index — 6G3)
The first model adopted in 1961. Equipped with the PGO-7 optical sight.

RPG-7V (GRAU index — 6G3)
Already in the early 1960s, the RPG-7 was equipped with the PGO-7V sight with corrected aiming angles, and since then has been designated RPG-7V.

RPG-7D (GRAU index — 6G5)
Airborne version with detachable barrel and bipod. Adopted in 1963.

RPG-7N / RPG-7DN (GRAU index — 6G3 and 6G5)
Modifications of RPG-7V and RPG-7D equipped with night sights PGN-1, NSPU, or NSPUM (GRAU index - 1PN58)

RPG-7V1 (GRAU index — 6G3-1)
1988 modification with PGO-7V3 optical sight, calibrated for new PG-7VR and TBG-7V rounds, as well as all earlier rounds. A removable bipod was also added.

RPG-7D1 (GRAU index — 6G5M)
1988 modification of the airborne version with PGO-7V3 sight

RPG-7V2 (GRAU index — 6G3-2)
2001 modification with the universal UP-7V sighting device

RPG-7V2 "Gaya"
Azerbaijani modification from 2012 with optical sight.

RPG-7D2 (GRAU index — 6G5M2)
2001 airborne variant with UP-7V universal sighting device

RPG-7D3 (GRAU index — 6G5M3)
2001 modification, airborne version of the RPG-7V2

B41M
A Vietnamese copy of the RPG-7. Its vented tube is divided into two threaded sections, designed to reinforce the launcher and allow it to fire more powerful warheads.

Airtronic USA RPG-7
U.S.-made clone of the RPG-7. As of 2013, it was reportedly in service with the special operations forces of Peru.

Airtronic USA Mk.777
U.S.-made lightweight version of the RPG-7, weighing only 3.5 kg. Service life of about 500–1000 rounds.

== Ammunition ==
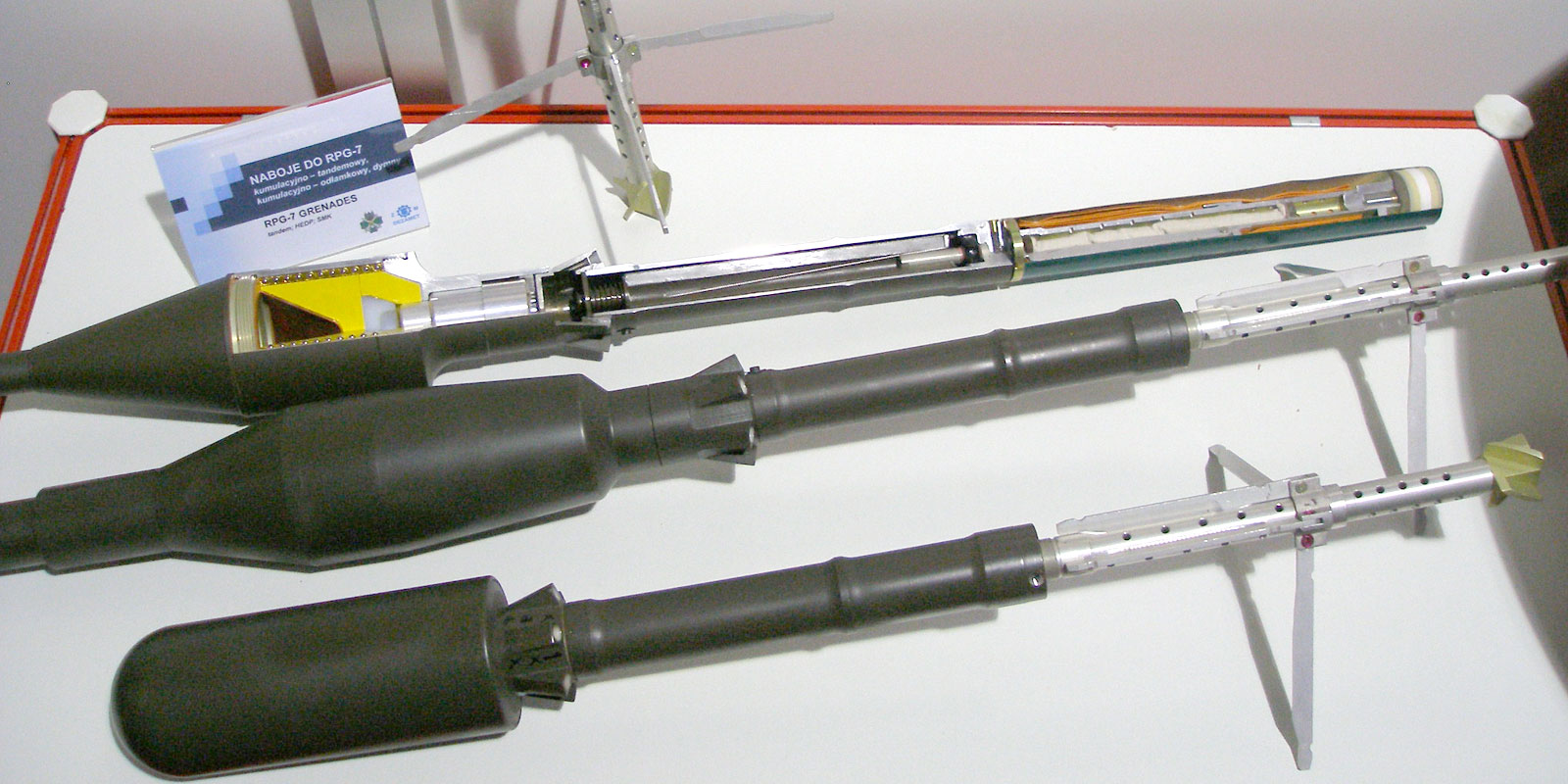
RPG-7 rockets

Inside of an RPG's three sections. I) The head contains: 1. trigger; 2. conductive cone; 3. aerodynamic fairing; 4. conical liner; 5. body; 6. explosive; 7. conductor; 8. detonator; II) The rocket motor consists of: 9. nozzle block; 10. nozzle; 11. motor body; 12. propellant; 13. motor rear; 14. ignition primer; III) The booster charge includes: 15. fin; 16. cartridge; 17. charge; 18. turbine; 19. tracer; 20. foam wad

The RPG-7 can fire a variety of warheads for anti-armor (HEAT, PG-Protivotankovaya Granata) or anti-personnel (HE, OG-Oskolochnaya Granata) purposes, usually fitting with an impact (PIBD) and a 4.5 second fuze. Armor penetration is warhead dependent and ranges from 300–600 mm (12–24 in) of RHA; one warhead, the PG-7VR, is a 'tandem charge' device, used to defeat reactive armor with a single shot. The Russian Ministry of Defense said in December 2023 that it has modified the RPG-7V grenade launcher in order to shoot 82-mm mines.

Current production ammunition for the RPG-7V2 consists of four main types:

- PG-7VL [c.1977] – improved 93 mm (3.7 in) HEAT warhead effective against most vehicles and fortified targets.
- PG-7VR [c.1988] – tandem charge warhead designed to penetrate up to 750 mm (30 in) rolled homogeneous armour (RHA) equivalence of explosive reactive armor (ERA) and the conventional armor underneath, or penetrate up to 900mm RHA without ERA. It has a range of 200 m (660 ft).
- TBG-7V Tanin [c.1988] – 105 mm (4.1 in) thermobaric warhead for anti-personnel and urban warfare.
- OG-7V [c.1999] – 40 mm (1.6 in) fragmentation warhead for anti-personnel warfare. Has no sustainer motor.

Other warhead variants include:

- PG-7V [c.1961] – baseline 85 mm (3.3 in) HEAT warhead capable of penetrating 260 mm (10 in) RHA.
- PG-7VM [c.1969] – improved 70 mm (2.8 in) HEAT warhead capable of penetrating 300 mm (12 in) RHA.
- PG-7VS [c.1972] – improved 73 mm (2.9 in) HEAT warhead capable of penetrating 400 mm (16 in) RHA.
- PG-7VS1 [c.mid-1970s] – cheaper PG-7VS version capable of penetrating 360 mm (14 in) RHA.
- GSh-7VT [c.2013] – anti-bunker warhead with cylindrical follow-through blast-fragmentation munition followed by explosively formed penetrator.
- OGi-7MA [unknown] – anti-personnel fragmentation munition developed for the Bulgarian ATGL-L. improved equivalent to the Soviet OG-7V. Compatible with RPG-7.

=== Specifications ===
Manufacturer specifications for the RPG-7V1.

Name	Type	Image	Weight	Explosive weight	Diameter	Penetration	Lethal radius
PG-7VL	Single-stage HEAT		2.6 kg (5.7 lb)	730 g (26 oz) OKFOL (95% HMX + 5% wax)	93 mm (3.7 in)	>500 mm (20 in) RHA	
PG-7VR	Tandem charge HEAT		4.5 kg (9.9 lb)	1.43 kg (3.2 lb) OKFOL (95% HMX + 5% wax)	64 mm (2.5 in)/105 mm (4.1 in)	600 mm (24 in) RHA (with reactive armor) 900 mm (35 in) RHA (without reactive armor)	
OG-7V	Fragmentation		2 kg (4 lb)	210 g (7.4 oz) A-IX-1	40 mm (1.6 in)		7 m (23 ft) (vs. body armor)
TBG-7V	Thermobaric		4.5 kg (9.9 lb)	1.9 kg (4.2 lb) ОМ 100МИ-3Л + 0.25 kg (0.55 lb) A-IX-1 (as thermobaric explosive booster)	105 mm (4.1 in)		10 m (30 ft)

== Hit probabilities ==
A 1976 U.S. Army evaluation of the weapon gave the hit probabilities on a 5-by-2.5-metre (16.4 ft × 8.2 ft) panel moving sideways at 4 m/s (13 ft/s). Crosswinds cause additional issues as the round steers into the wind; in an 11 km/h (6.8 mph) wind, firing at a stationary tank sized target, the gunner cannot expect to get a first-round hit more than 50% of the time at 180 m (590 ft).

Range m (ft)	Percent
50 (160)	100
100 (330)	96
200 (660)	51
300 (980)	22
400 (1,300)	9
500 (1,600)	4

View source data.

== History of use ==
The RPG-7 was first used in 1967 by Egypt during the Six-Day War, and by the Viet Cong during the Vietnam War, but it did not see widespread usage in Vietnam until the following year.

The RPG-7 was introduced to North Vietnam starting in 1966 was widely used by North Vietnamese forces and the Viet Cong during the Vietnam War. It was a crucial weapon for the Vietnamese, especially against American tanks and other armored vehicles. It was supplied to them by the Soviet Union and China (China produced a license-built version called the Type 65 RPG.).

The RPG-7 was used by the Provisional Irish Republican Army in Northern Ireland from 1969 to 2005, particularly in Lurgan, County Armagh, against British Army observation posts and the towering military base at Kitchen Hill in the town. The IRA also used them in Catholic areas of West Belfast against British Army armoured personnel carriers (APCs) and Army forward operating bases (FOBs). Beechmount Avenue in Belfast became known as "RPG Avenue" after attacks on British troops.

In Mogadishu, Somalia, RPG-7s were used to down two U.S. Army Black Hawk helicopters in 1993.

During the first and second Chechen wars, the Chechen Republic of Ichkeria used RPG-7s which they had captured from Soviet bases and used them against Russian armored columns. During the first war, Russians may have lost 100 tanks and 250 armoured fighting vehicles (AFVs) in Grozny. The Chechens were able to knock out T-72s with three or four RPG-7 hits. Against T-72s with explosive reactive armor, the Chechens fired an RPG in close range (within 50 m (160 ft)) to detonate the armor and followed this with RPG hits on the then exposed area of the tank, also from close range. The RPG-7 was also effective against AFVs, buildings and personnel.

The PG-7VR has been used by Iraqi insurgents. On 28 August 2003, it achieved a mobility kill against an American M1 Abrams hitting the left side hull next to the forward section of the engine compartment.

During the War in Afghanistan (2001–2021), several M1A2 Abrams were temporarily disabled by RPG-7 hits.

== Users ==
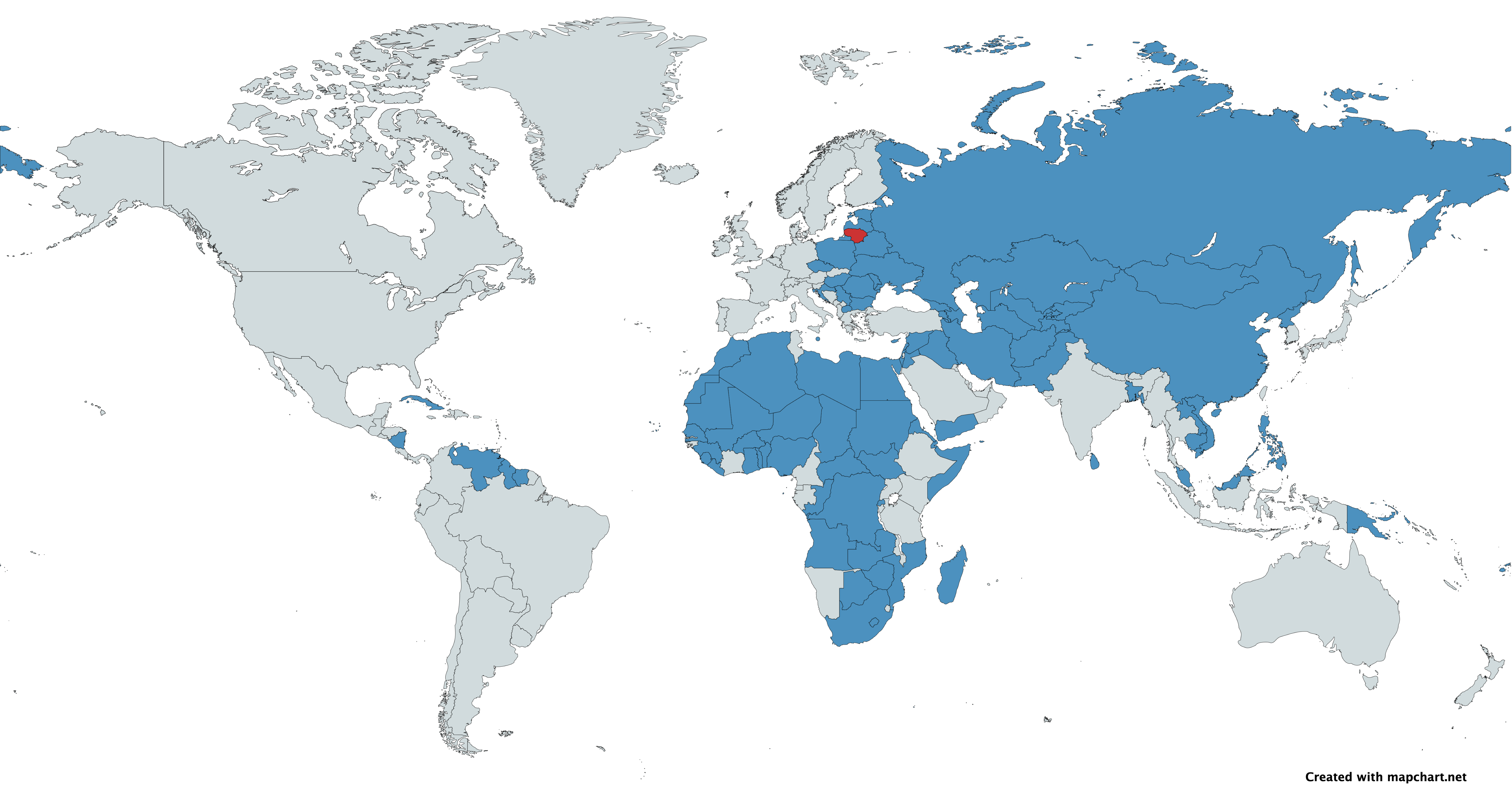
A map with users of the RPG-7 in blue and former users in red

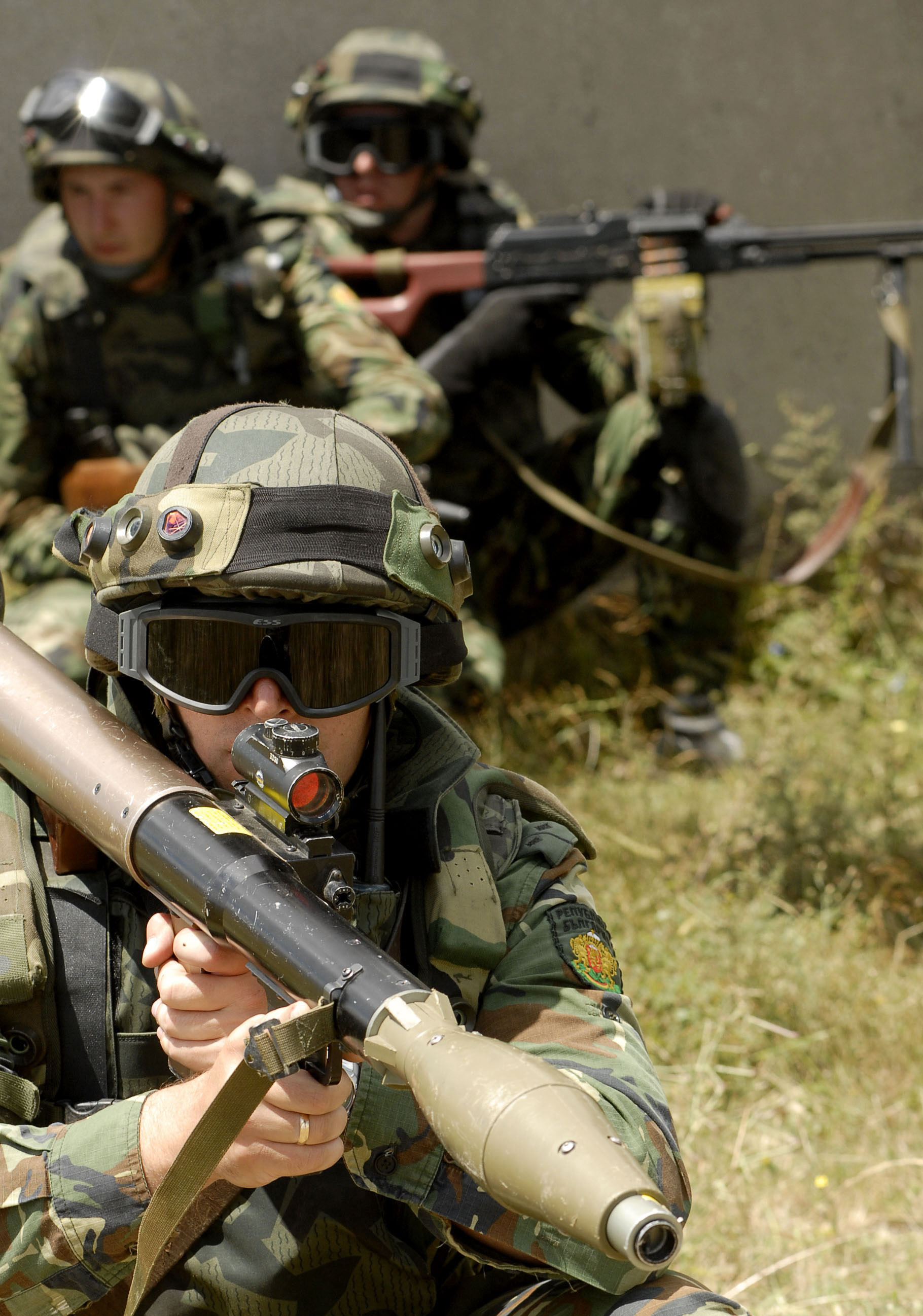
A Bulgarian soldier with an ATGL-L (Bulgarian copy of the RPG-7) equipped with a red dot reflex sight.

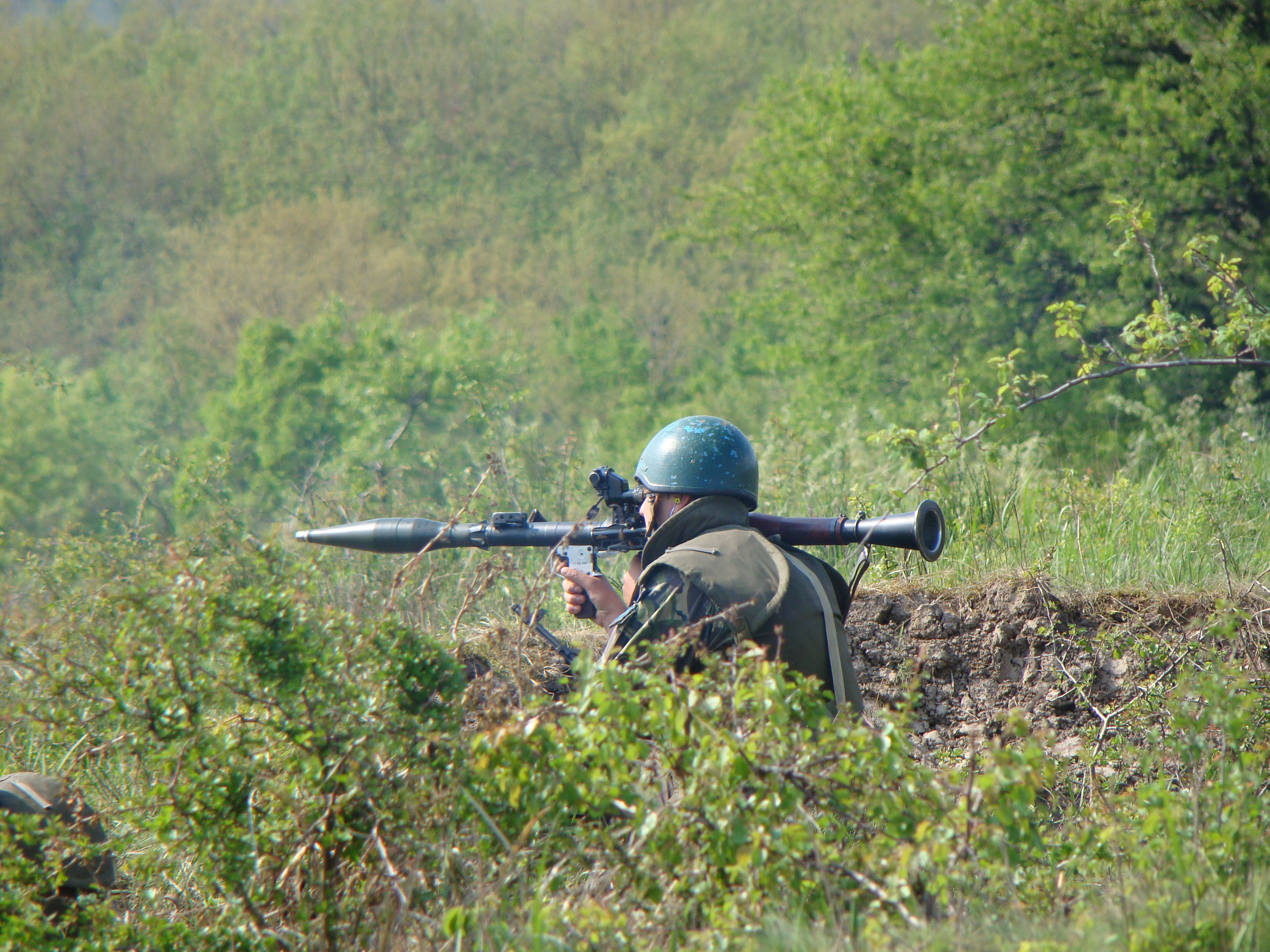
A Romanian soldier with an AG-7 (licensed built RPG-7).

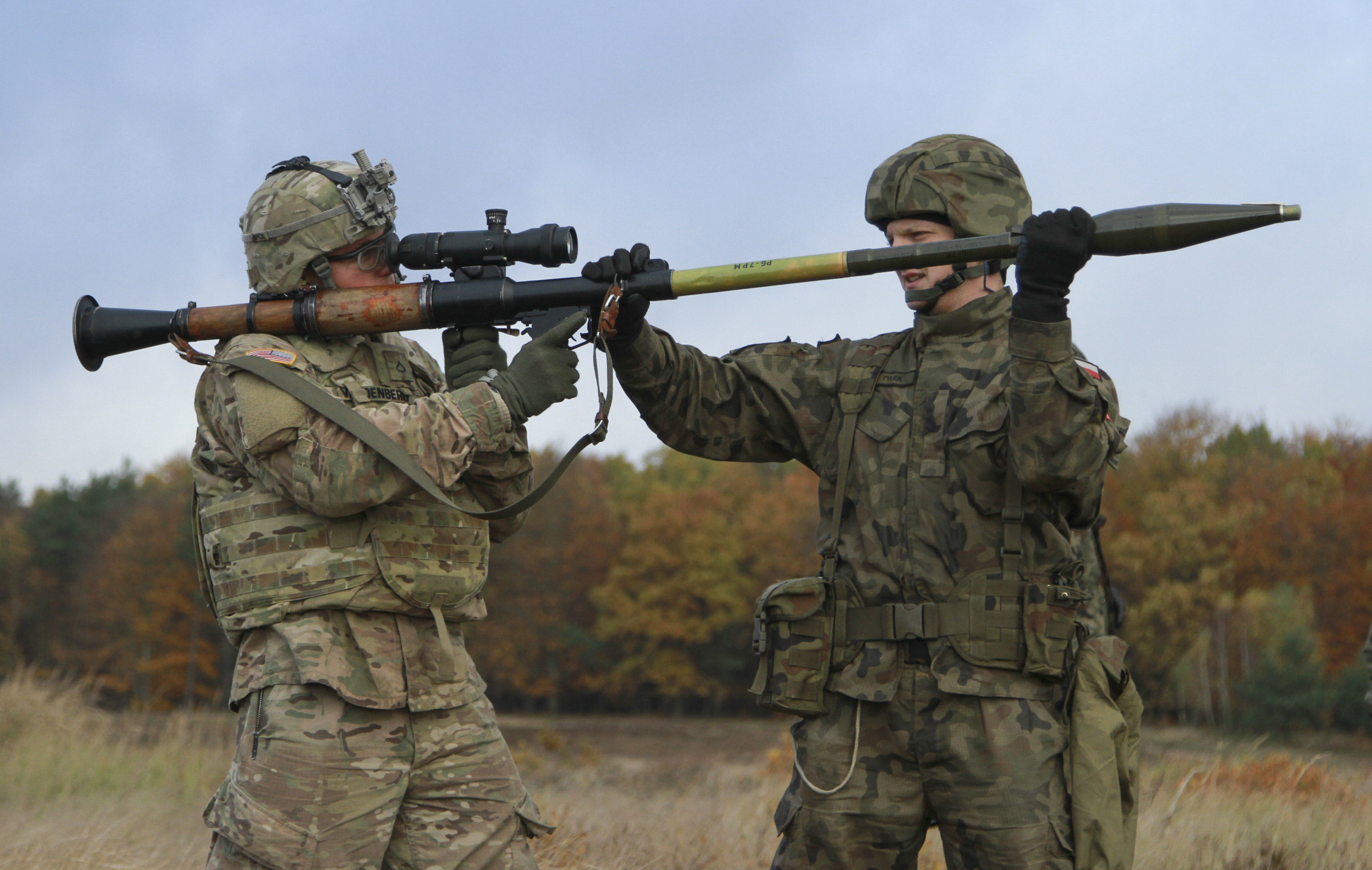
A Polish and an American soldier with RPG-7D variant.

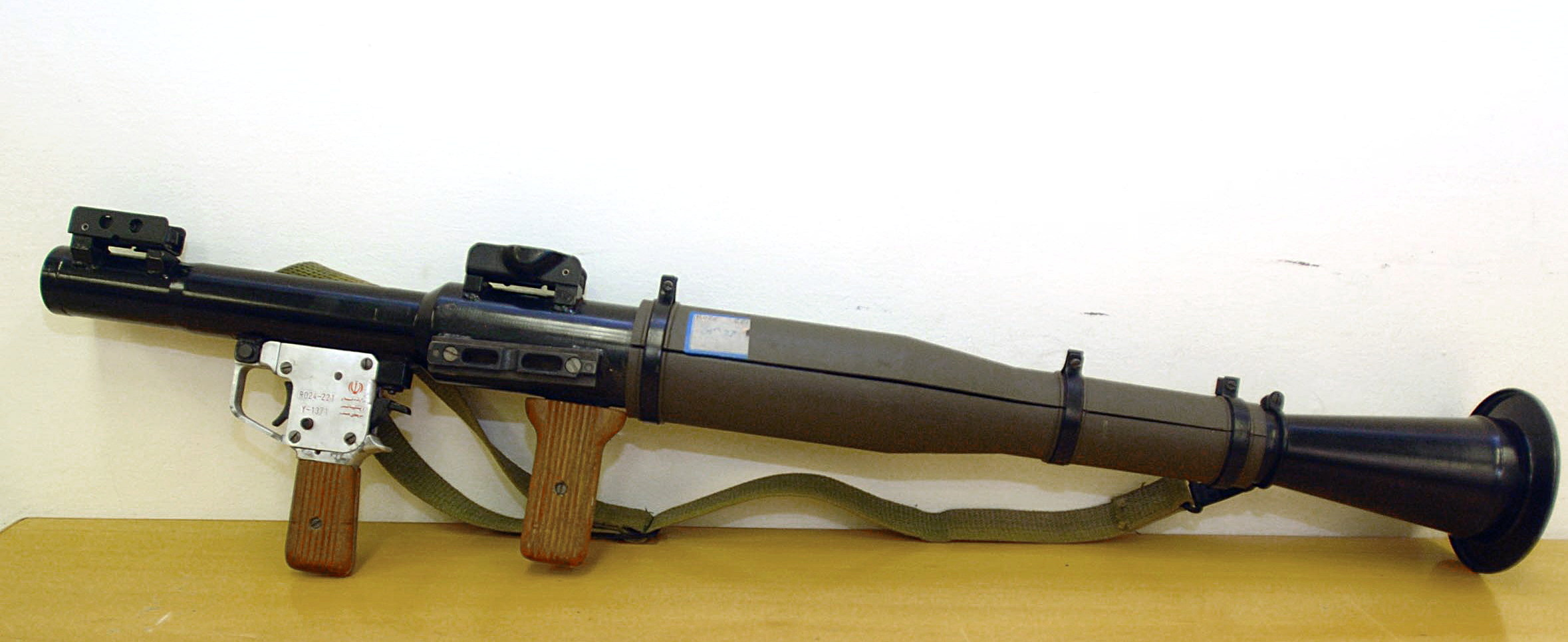
Iranian manufactured RPG-7 launcher, uncovered in Lebanon, by the IDF.

- Albania: Albania mainly owns the Type 69 rocket launcher, a Chinese copy of the RPG-7. They also have a locally manufactured variant called the "Tip-57." Both are inherited from the communist era and have been kept in storage. In 2022 the MoD published videos on their official YouTube channel where the ground forces were seen using them while training that same year.
- Algeria
- Angola
- Armenia
- Azerbaijan
- Bangladesh: Chinese Type 69 RPG variant used by Bangladesh Army.
- Belarus
- Benin
- Botswana
- Bulgaria: Produced locally by Arsenal Corporation as ATGL-L.
- Burkina Faso
- Cambodia
- Cape Verde
- Central African Republic
- Chad
- China: Type 69 reverse-engineered copy.
- Congo-Brazzaville
- Congo-Kinshasa
- Croatia
- Cuba
- Cyprus: RPG-7V variant, locally produced since 2025.
- Czech Republic
- Djibouti
- Egypt: Locally produced without license as PG-7 by the Sakr Factory for Developed Industries.
- Ethiopia
- Eritrea
- Estonia
- Fiji
- Georgia: Modified version "RPG-7D" locally produced by STC Delta.
- Ghana
- Guinea
- Guyana
- Honduras
- Hungary
- Indonesia Bulgarian Made ATGL-L
- Iran Produced locally as Sageg.
- Iraq Produced locally as Al-Nassira from the 1980s by Ba'athist Iraq.
- Israel: Large stocks held as secondary ATW. Rounds produced locally.
- Jordan
- Kurdistan
- Kazakhstan
- Kyrgyzstan
- Laos
- Latvia
- Lebanon
- Lesotho
- Liberia: Used by both the Liberian Army and guerrilla factions in the Liberian Civil War.
- Libya (used by both sides in the Libyan Civil War)
- Madagascar
- Malaysia: Bulgarian ATGL-L versions are purchased and used since the early 2000s
- Mali
- Malta
- Mauritania
- Moldova:
  - Transnistria
- Mongolia
- Morocco
- Mozambique: Non state-users.
- Myanmar: MA-10 RPG made by Myanmar Directorate of Defence Industries.
- Nicaragua
- Nigeria: Produced under license by the Defence Industries Corporation of Nigeria
- Niger
- North Korea
- North Macedonia
- Pakistan: Used by the Pakistan Army and paramilitary forces. RPG-7V version made under license by Pakistan Machine Tool Factory.
- Papua New Guinea
- Philippines: Philippine Army maintains mixed stock of Bulgarian ATGL-L2, Chinese Type 69, and Russian RPG-7V2. Philippine Marine Corps adopted Bulgarian ATGL-L.
- Poland: Produced RPG-7 and RPG-7W variants.
- Romania: Produced locally by SC Carfil SA from Brașov as AG-7 (Romanian: Aruncătorul de Grenade 7, Grenade Launcher 7).
- Russia
- Rwanda
- Sahrawi Arab Democratic Republic: Used by the Polisario Front.
- Sao Tome and Principe
- Senegal
- Serbia: Made by PPT Namenska.
- Seychelles
- Sierra Leone
- Somalia
- South Africa: South African National Defence Force.
- South Sudan: South Sudan Democratic Movement, Sudan Liberation Movement/Army, South Sudan Defence Forces, Sudan People's Liberation Army used RPG-7, Type 69s and Iranian-made RPGs.
- Sri Lanka
- Sudan: Made by Military Industry Corporation as the Sinar.
- Suriname: Used by the Military of Suriname.
- (Syrian opposition) Syria
- Tajikistan:
- Togo
- Turkey
- Turkmenistan:
- Ukraine:
- Uzbekistan: Produced locally.
- Venezuela
- Vietnam: Locally produced and designated as RPG7V-VN. Also popularly recognized under the designation B-41.
- Yemen
- Zambia
- Zimbabwe

=== Non-state users ===
- (Palestinian Islamic Jihad) Al-Quds Brigades
- ISIL
- New Irish Republican Army
- Hezbollah
- Houthi movement
- Provisional Irish Republican Army
- (Hamas) Qassam Brigades
- Syrian opposition
- Taliban
- Ulster Volunteer Force

=== Former users ===
- Afghanistan
- Artsakh
- Chechen Republic of Ichkeria - Used by Chechen forces during the First Chechen War
- Grenada
- Lithuania

== Conflicts ==
=== 1960s ===
- Vietnam War (1955–1975): First used in 1967.
- Basque conflict (1959–2011)
- Laotian Civil War (1960–1975)
- Guatemalan Civil War (1960-1996)
- Portuguese Colonial War (1961–1976)
- Rhodesian Bush War (1964–1979)
- Colombian conflict (1964–present)
- Communist insurgency in Thailand (1965–1983)
- South African Border War (1966–1990)
- Six Day War (1967)
- Cambodian Civil War (1967–1975)
- The Troubles (late 1960s–1998)

=== 1970s ===
- Yom Kippur War (1973)
- Ethiopian Civil War (1974–1991)
- Lebanese Civil War (1975–1990)
- Western Sahara War (1975–1991)
- Angolan Civil War (1975–2002)
- Uganda–Tanzania War (1978–1979)
- Cambodian–Vietnamese War (1978–1979)
- Nicaraguan Revolution (1978–1990)
- Sino-Vietnamese War (1979)
- Soviet–Afghan War (1979–1989)
- Salvadoran Civil War (1979–1992)

=== 1980s ===
- Iran-Iraq War (1980–1988)
- Soviet-Afghan War(1979-1989)
- Internal conflict in Peru (1980–present)
- 1982 Lebanon War (1982)
- Sri Lankan Civil War (1983–2009)
- Second Sudanese Civil War (1983–2005)
- South Lebanon conflict (1985–2000)
- Thai–Laotian Border War (1987–1988)
- First Nagorno-Karabakh War (1988–1994)
- First Liberian Civil War (1989–1997)

=== 1990s ===
- Gulf War (1990–1991)
- Rwandan Civil War (1990–1994)
- Cenepa War (1995)
- Somali Civil War (1991–present)
- First Chechen War (1994–1996)
- First Congo War (1996–1997)
- Eritrean–Ethiopian War (1998–2000)
- Second Congo War (1998–2003)
- Second Chechen War (1999–2009)

=== 2000s ===
- War in Afghanistan (2001–2021)
- Iraq War (2003–2011)
- Peenar-Evil War (2000-2014){

=== 2010s ===
- Syrian Civil War (2011–present)
- First Libyan Civil War (2011)
- Central African Republic Civil War (2012–present)
- War in Iraq (2013–2017)
- South Sudanese Civil War (2013–2020)
- Second Libyan Civil War (2014–2020)
- Yemeni Civil War (2014–present)

=== 2020s ===
- Tigray War (2020–2022)
- Russo-Ukrainian War (2014–present)
  - Russian invasion of Ukraine (2022–present)
- War in Amhara (2023–present)
- Gaza war (2023–present)
- 2025 Cambodia–Thailand conflict (2025)

== See also ==
- RPG-2 – (Soviet Union)
- Panzerfaust – (Nazi Germany)
- Panzerfaust 2 – (West Germany)
- Panzerfaust 3 – (West Germany)
- PSRL-1 – (United States)
- Type 69 RPG – (China)
- 55 S 55 – (Finland)
- B40 (RPG) – (Vietnam)
- RPG-27 – (Soviet Union)
