= Panzerfaust (disambiguation) =

The German term Panzerfaust (Tank-fist) is a name given to a World War II–era disposable recoilless single-shot light anti-tank launcher, referring to their warheads having a caliber larger than their launcher tube, making them protrude like a fist.

Panzerfaust may also refer to:

- Panzerfaust 2, a Cold War-era reloadable anti-tank rocket launcher, also known as the Panzerfaust 44 Lanze
- Panzerfaust 3, a modern day–era semi-disposable anti-tank rocket launcher

The success of the Panzerfaust during WWII popularised the name and may refer to the following:

== Military ==
- Fliegende Panzerfaust, a very-short-range interceptor developed by Zeppelin during World War 2 to intercept Allied bomber aircraft
- Operation Panzerfaust (German: Unternehmen Panzerfaust), the German military invasion of Hungary in October 1944

== Music ==
- Panzerfaust Records, a Minnesota-based white supremacist record label
- Panzerfaust (album), an album by the Norwegian black metal band Darkthrone
- Panzerfaust (band), a Canadian black metal band
- Panzerfaust (song), a song by industrial band KMFDM on its 2011 album WTF?!

== Other ==
- Panzerfaust Magazine, a periodical (1967–1982) about wargaming
