= PzF 44 =

Leichte Panzerfaust 44 mm "Lanze"
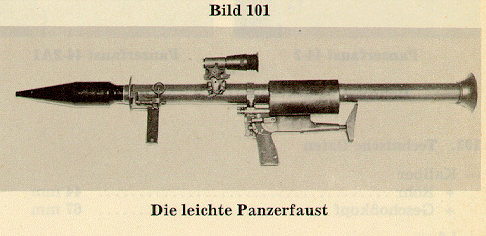
- PzF 44
- Type: Anti-tank rocket launcher
- Place of origin: West Germany

Service history
- In service: 1963–1992
- Used by: See Operators
- Wars: Nigerian Civil War

Production history
- Designed: 1960
- Manufacturer: Dynamit Nobel
- Produced: 1963–1992
- Variants: See Variants

Specifications
- Mass: Unloaded: 7.82 kg (17 lb 4 oz); Loaded: 10.12 kg (22 lb 5 oz)
- Length: Unloaded: 880 mm (2 ft 11 in); Loaded: 1,180 mm (3 ft 10 in)
- Cartridge: 44×537mm rocket cartridge
- Caliber: Barrel: 44 mm (1.7 in); Warhead: 67 mm (2.6 in)
- Muzzle velocity: At muzzle: 168 m/s (550 ft/s); At max Vo: 210 m/s (690 ft/s)
- Maximum firing range: ~ 400 m (1,300 ft)
- Sights: Telescope

The PzF 44 (abbreviation for Panzerfaust 44 mm, formally also Leichte Panzerfaust, meaning "Light tank-fist", also known as Panzerfaust Lanze (lance) and Panzerfaust 2/Panzerfaust II), was a West German portable recoilless shoulder-fired anti-tank rocket launcher with a barrel-caliber of 44 mm (1.7 in). It was the spiritual successor to the Panzerfaust from World War II and served with the West German Army from the early 1960s to the early 1990s, when it was replaced by the Panzerfaust 3 semi-disposable launcher.

The PzF 44 is called "recoilless" in the sense that it ejects propellant gas rearwards of the chamber upon firing, so called backblast, and not because it truly lacks recoil. Backblast heavily counters recoil but does not fully remove it. The effect of the minimized recoil however is great enough to allow a portable weapon like this to fire large caliber warheads without causing trauma to the user.

== History ==
The anti-tank grenade launcher was originally developed around 1960 and put into service by the Bundeswehr in 1963. It was developed to provide West German infantry with a modern replacement for the bazooka that they had previously used. As such, it was the first German antitank rocket developed after World War II, a conflict in which German hand-held antitank weapons such as the Panzerfaust played a prominent role during 1944–45. The PzF 44 was a product of a period in which the German army was re-equipped with locally developed arms and equipment and retired the aging U.S. gear that had formed their initial arsenal. The full designation name by the German Army is Panzerfaust 44mm DM2 Ausführung 1 Lanze.

Some PzF 44 were used by Nigerian Army during the Biafran War.

Starting in 1992, the PzF 44 was replaced by the Panzerfaust 3.

== Specifications ==
The PzF 44's 1.5 kg (3.3 lb) high-explosive anti-tank (HEAT) cartridge (Panzerfaustgeschoß DM32) could penetrate 370 mm (15 in) of rolled homogeneous armour and hit moving targets at a range of 300 m (980 ft). The PzF 44 could also fire a multi-purpose warhead.

Performance of PzF 44 and contemporary weapons
| Weapon | Cartridge | Penetration vs RHA | Max range vs moving target |
|---|---|---|---|
| PzF 44 | PzF-gesch DM32 | 370 mm (1 ft 3 in) | 300 m (330 yd) |
| RPG-7 | PG-7V rocket | 320 mm (1 ft 1 in) | 300 m (330 yd) |
| M72 LAW | Rocket HE 66MM M72 | 305 mm (1 ft 0 in) | 150 m (160 yd) |

== Variants ==
- Model 44-1 – Initial version of the PzF 44.
- Model 44-1A1 – Later version of the PzE 44–1.
- Model 44-2 – Later model of the PzF 44.
- Model 44-2A1 – Model 44–2 with different sight mount.

== Operators ==
- Nigeria
- West Germany

== See also ==
- 55 S 55 – (Finland)
- Armbrust – (West Germany)
- MATADOR – (Israel, Singapore)
- Panzerschreck – (Nazi Germany, Germany)
- Panzerfaust 3 – (West Germany)
- PSRL-1 – (United States)
- RPG-2 – (Soviet Union)
- RPG-7 – (Soviet Union)
- Type 69 – (China)
