= RGW 110 =

German disposable shoulder-fired anti-tank weapon

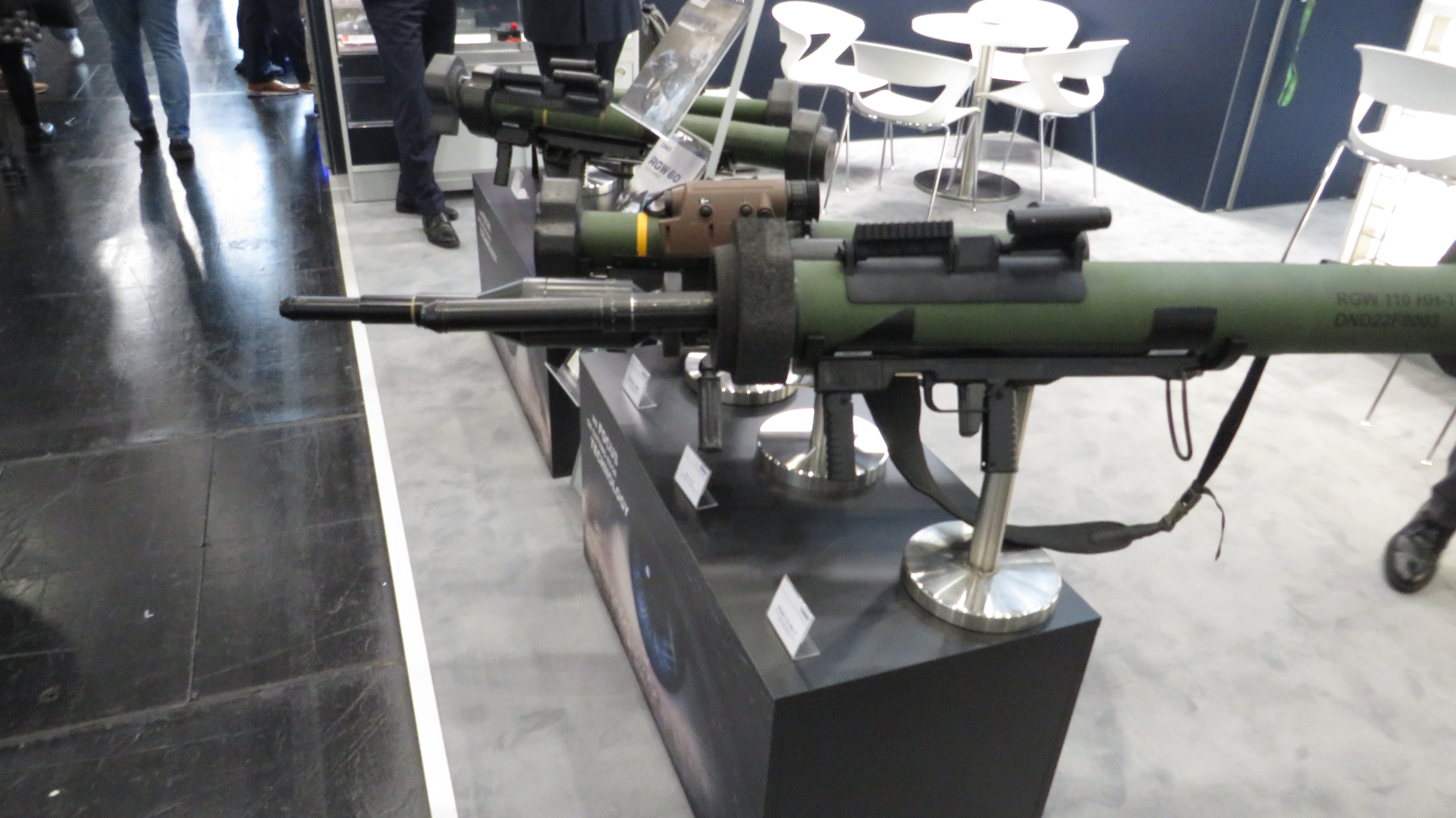
- Type: Disposable shoulder-fired anti-tank weapon
- Place of origin: Germany

Service history
- Used by: See Operators

Production history
- Designer: Dynamit Nobel Defence
- Manufacturer: Dynamit Nobel Defence
- Variants: RGW 110 HH-T

Specifications
- Cartridge: Rocket-propelled grenade
- Caliber: 110 mm

The RGW 110 (Recoilless Grenade Weapon 110) is a German 110 mm disposable, shoulder-fired anti-tank weapon developed by Dynamit Nobel Defence. It forms part of the company's RGW family of infantry weapons and is intended as a successor to the Panzerfaust 3. The system is designed for use against armoured vehicles and structures.

Hungary became the first customer for the RGW 110 HH-T variant in 2022, and Hungarian military units were conducting training with the system by May 2026. Finland announced its selection of the system in October 2026, with deliveries scheduled to begin in 2027.

== Development and production ==
Dynamit Nobel Defence developed the RGW 110 to extend its RGW product family to the 110 mm calibre. The manufacturer describes the system as the next generation of its Panzerfaust family.

In December 2022, European Security & Defence reported that Hungary had become the first customer for the RGW 110 HH-T. A joint venture between Dynamit Nobel Defence and Hungary's N7 Holding had received a contract to manufacture and supply the weapons. The arrangement also envisaged Hungarian participation in the wider production and supply chain for the RGW family.

In September 2026, the Hungarian defence publication Honvédelem reported that Dynamit Nobel Defence Hungary's facility in Vecsés was preparing to begin manufacturing launcher tubes for RGW 110 weapons ordered by the Hungarian Defence Forces. The German–Hungarian project included component production and assembly in Hungary, with warhead development undertaken in Germany.

== Description ==
The RGW 110 is a single-use, shoulder-fired infantry weapon with a 110 mm warhead. Its intended roles include anti-tank combat, engagement of other vehicles, and attacks against structures.

The weapon uses a rocket-propelled projectile. The HH-T configuration incorporates a tandem warhead and provides both high-explosive anti-tank and high-explosive squash-head capabilities.

=== Warhead ===
The tandem warhead is intended to retain armour-penetrating capability against vehicles fitted with reactive armour. A September 2026 report published by Honvédelem credited the RGW 110 with penetration of up to 1,000 mm of homogeneous steel armour and stated that it retained substantial penetration after defeating reactive armour.

== Variants ==
RGW 110 HH-T
The initial publicly announced variant. The designation HH-T refers to HEAT/HESH Tandem, combining high-explosive anti-tank and high-explosive squash-head capabilities in a tandem-warhead configuration.

== Service history ==
=== Hungary ===
Hungary was announced as the first customer in December 2022.

In May 2026, the Hungarian Defence Forces reported that RGW 110 training had begun with the Kinizsi Pál 30th Armoured Infantry Brigade. Soldiers of its 1st Grenadier Battalion conducted practice firing with a sub-calibre training system.

=== Finland ===
On 28 October 2026, Finland announced the procurement of the RGW 110 from Dynamit Nobel Defence. The acquisition was valued at approximately €84.5 million, excluding value-added tax, and included training equipment. Deliveries and training were scheduled to begin in 2027.

The system was selected to replace the APILAS, which Finland had acquired in the 1980s, in the heavy short-range anti-tank role.

== Operators ==
=== Current operators ===
- Hungary – Selected in 2022; military training with the system was documented in May 2026.

=== Future operators ===
- Finland – Procurement announced in October 2026, with deliveries and training scheduled to begin in 2027.

== See also ==
- Panzerfaust 3
- MATADOR
- APILAS
- AT4
- M72 LAW
