= Armbrust =

Recoilless anti-tank gun

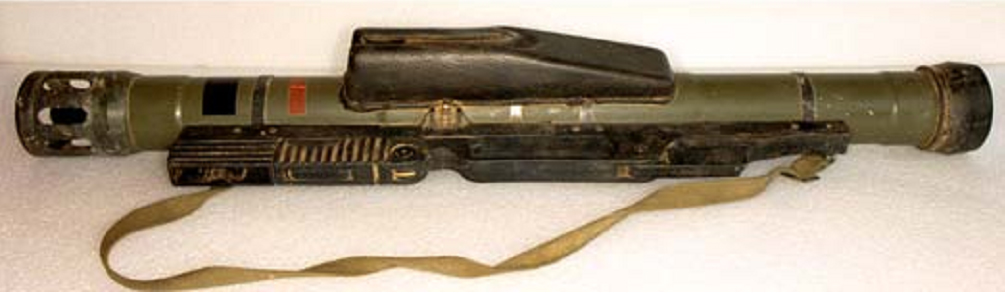
- An Armbrust launcher
- Type: Recoilless gun
- Place of origin: West Germany

Service history
- Used by: See Operators
- Wars: Cambodian–Vietnamese War; Yugoslav Wars; Cambodian–Thai border stand-off; 2013 Lahad Datu standoff

Production history
- Designer: Messerschmitt-Bölkow-Blohm (MBB)
- Manufacturer: Messerschmitt-Bölkow-Blohm (MBB); Pouderies Réunies de Belgique (PRB); ST Kinetics (STK)
- Variants: Armbrust AT, Armbrust AP, Armbrust Ub, Armbrust SC

Specifications
- Mass: 6.3 kg (13 lb 14 oz)
- Length: 850 mm (2 ft 9 in)
- Width: 126 mm (5.0 in)
- Height: 140 mm (5.5 in)
- Caliber: 67 mm (2.6 in)
- Action: Recoilless weapon
- Muzzle velocity: 210 m/s (690 ft/s)
- Effective firing range: 300 m (980 ft)
- Maximum firing range: 1,500 m (4,900 ft)
- Feed system: Single shot
- Sights: Reticle, externally illuminated for night

Armbrust (German: Crossbow) is a lightweight unguided anti-tank weapon designed and developed by Messerschmitt-Bölkow-Blohm of Germany, who later sold its manufacturing rights to Chartered Industries of Singapore (the predecessor of ST Kinetics).

== Overview ==
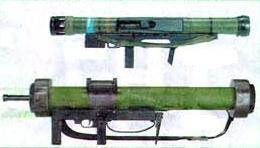
Comparing the Armbrust (top) and MATADOR (bottom)

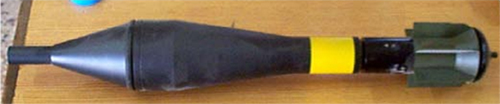
An Armbrust 67 mm projectile (via Iraq OIG)

The Armbrust is a recoilless weapon, and is one of the few weapons of this kind that may safely be fired in an enclosed space. The propellant charge is placed between two pistons with the projectile in front of one and a mass of shredded plastic in the rear. Unlike most recoilless weapons, it is a true counter-shot weapon, as the mass of the projectile is equal to the mass of the counterweight and they are ejected from the barrel at the same initial velocity. When the weapon is fired, the propellant expands, pushing the two pistons out. The projectile is forced out of the front and the plastic out of the back. The plastic disperses on leaving the back of the barrel, and is quickly stopped by air resistance. The pistons jam at either end of the barrel, locking the hot gases inside. Its warhead can penetrate up to 300 mm of steel armor.

Since 2004, Armbrusts have gradually been replaced by the Israeli-German-Singapore co-developed MATADOR.

== Combat use ==
During the Cambodian–Vietnamese War, Armbrust was supplied to the Cambodian Khmer Rouge. It was used in their fight against the Cambodian government, as well as against the Vietnamese Army. Cuban troops in Angola captured several Armbrust launchers from UNITA during the late 1980s.

In the early 1990s, Slovenian and Croatian forces obtained a number of Armbrusts and used them against the Yugoslav People's Army (JNA) armoured vehicles during the Yugoslav Wars in 1991. While the Armbrust couldn't defeat the frontal armour of the M-84 tank, it could penetrate the thinner sides and rear. It was also used to destroy armoured personnel carriers of the JNA, such as the M-60 and BOV. In 1998, the Kosovo Liberation Army smuggled a small number of launchers from the border with Albania, using them against Serbian tanks and armoured fighting vehicles.

== Operators ==
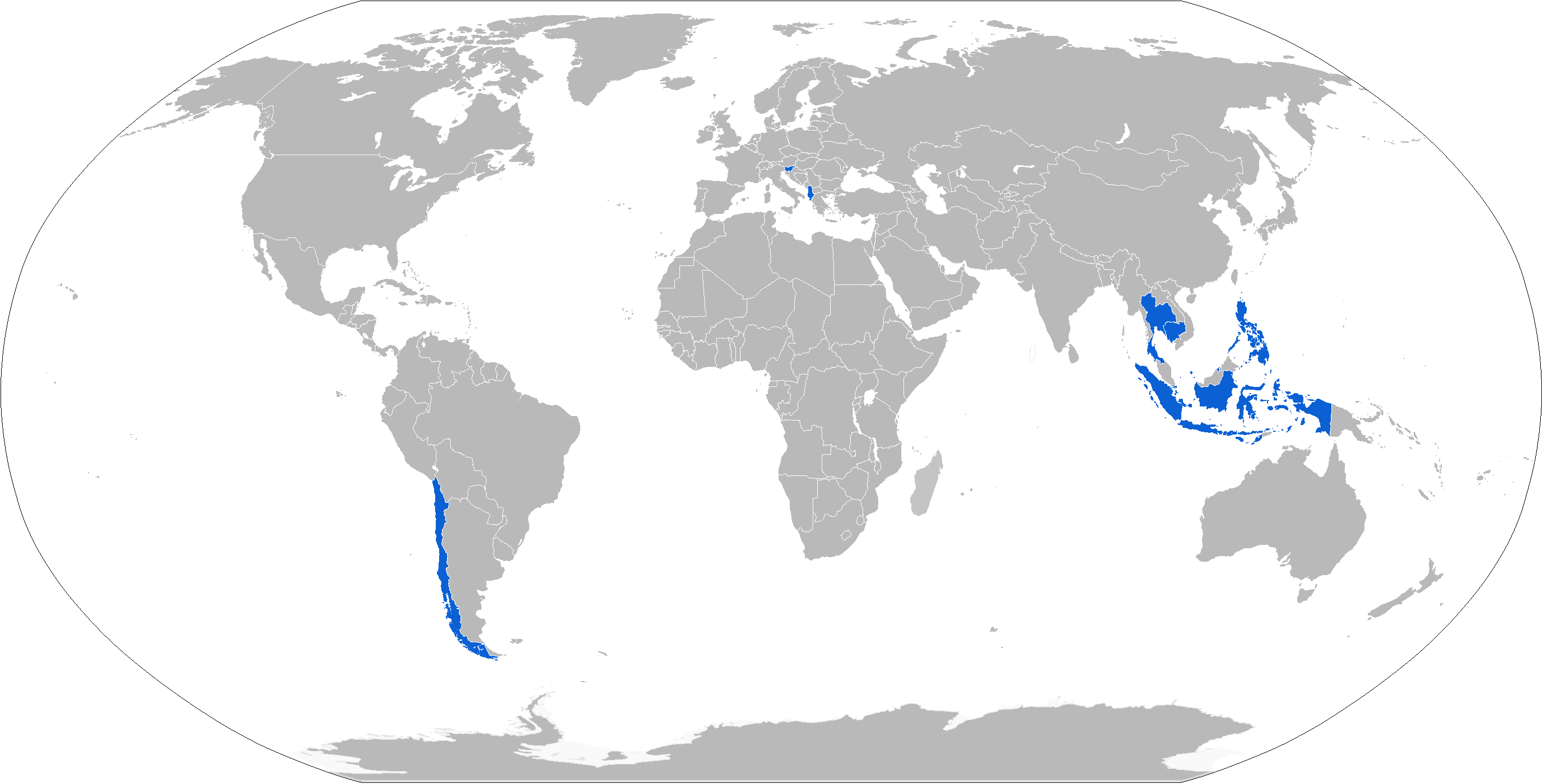
Map with Armbrust operators in blue

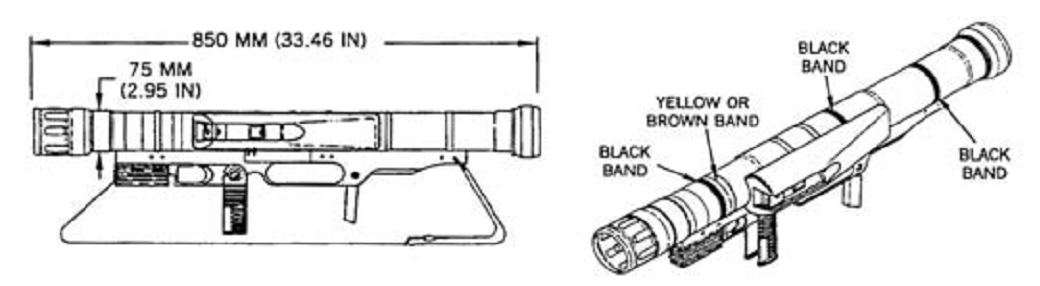
Line drawing of the Armbrust (via Iraq OIG)

External images
- Armbrust 1980s brochure photos
- Soldier firing Armbrust
- Details of Armbrust and cut-away drawing
- Details of firing of Armbrust low launch signature
- Details of Armbrust anti-armour and anti-personnel projectiles

=== Current ===
- Brunei
- Cambodia
- Chile
- Indonesia – Komando Pasukan Katak (Kopaska) tactical diver group and Komando Pasukan Khusus (Kopassus) special forces group.
- Philippines – Philippine Army, Philippine Marine Corps, Presidential Security Group
- Singapore
- Slovenia − First used during the Ten-Day War
- Thailand

=== Former ===
- Croatia – Used during the Croatian War of Independence
- Kosovo Liberation Army − Used during the Kosovo War

== See also ==
- PzF 44 – (West Germany)
- Panzerfaust 3 – (West Germany)
