= Panzerfaust 3 =

German 1980s anti-tank rocket launcher

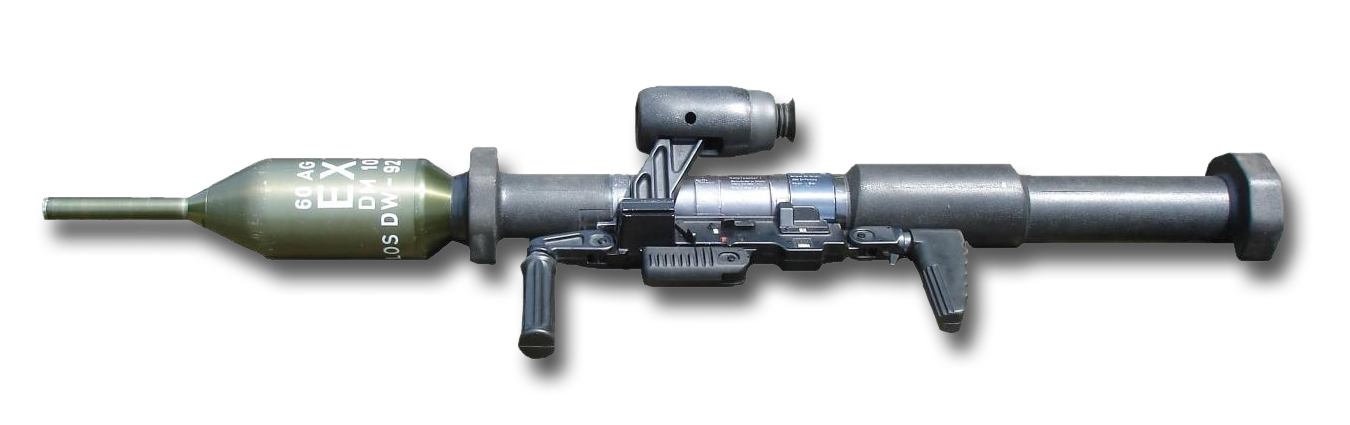
- A combat-ready Panzerfaust 3
- Type: Disposable anti-tank rocket-propelled grenade launcher
- Place of origin: West Germany

Service history
- In service: 1987–present
- Used by: See Operators
- Wars: War in Afghanistan (2001–2021); Syrian Civil War; War in Iraq (2013–2017); Russo-Ukrainian War

Production history
- Designer: Dynamit Nobel AG
- Designed: 1978–1985
- Manufacturer: Dynamit Nobel AG; IHI Aerospace (Licensed)
- Variants: Panzerfaust 3-T, Panzerfaust 3-IT600, Panzerfaust 3LW, Panzerfaust 3LW-HESH, Bunkerfaust, 110 mm (4.3 in) anti-tank weapon

Specifications
- Mass: Configuration: Hollow charge warhead: 12.9 kg (28 lb 7 oz); Tandem hollow charge warhead: 13.3 kg (29 lb 5 oz); Bunker-buster warhead: 13.3 kg (29 lb 5 oz); Unloaded firing unit: 2.3 kg (5 lb 1 oz); Ready to fire: 15.2 - 15.6 kg (34 lb 6 oz)
- Length: 950 mm (3 ft 1 in)
- Caliber: 60 mm (2.4 in) barrel, 110 mm (4.3 in) warhead
- Muzzle velocity: 115.0 m/s (377 ft/s)
- Maximum firing range: 920 m (3,020 ft) (automatic self-destructs once beyond the range)
- Sights: Hensoldt Wetzlar ZF 2.5 X 10 Telescopic sight

The Panzerfaust 3 (lit. 'armor fist' or 'tank fist') is a modern semi-disposable recoilless anti-tank weapon, which was developed between 1978 and 1985 and first entered service with the Bundeswehr in 1987 (although they did not officially adopt it until 1992). It was first ordered in 1973 to provide West German infantry with an effective weapon against contemporary Soviet armor, thereby replacing West Germany's aging PzF 44 Light Lanze launchers and the heavy Carl Gustaf 84 mm anti-tank recoilless rifle manufactured in Sweden.

The Panzerfaust 3 is operated by at least 11 countries and has seen combat in Afghanistan and Ukraine.

== History ==
The Panzerfaust 3's name dates back to the Panzerfaust used by the German army in World War II, which consisted of a small, disposable preloaded launch tube firing a high-explosive anti-tank (HEAT) warhead, operated by one soldier.

The introduction of reactive and active armors on combat vehicles of the then Warsaw Pact countries started a development in the technology of the ability of the warheads, the effective range and the optical sights of anti-tank recoilless rifles were therefore improved substantially. Despite these technological improvements, the primary role of the recoilless firing system as the most effective weapon against armored tanks, at a distance up to 600 m (2,000 ft), remained the most important to infantrymen until the late 1990s.

After the formation of the Bundeswehr in 1956, one task of all troop formations was "fighting armored vehicles and tanks". The Bundeswehr at the time was equipped with the aging Panzerfaust 44 and the heavy Carl Gustaf 84 mm recoilless rifle. These infantry weapon systems equipped with an armor-piercing shaped charge warhead would have fought not only tanks but also machine gun nests, anti-tank positions, bunkers or field positions, etc. in open terrain. During the 1970s, new conceptional and tactical considerations were made in order to balance the constantly progressing development in tank technology.

=== Timetable ===
Month	Year	Major development
	1978	Concept definition
October	1978	Request for proposals
November	1979	Initial prototype fabricated
	1980	First tests
	1984	System man-rated
July	1987	Low-rate serial production begins
November	1987	Initial operational ability in Germany
February	1989	First export sale to Japan
August	1991	Second export sale to Switzerland
Late	1993	Development of new guided round revealed
July	1995	New urban combat round (Bunkerfaust) becomes available
	2002–2003	Production ongoing and development of new warheads continues; competitive evaluation ongoing

In 1979, Dynamit Nobel AG received a development order. The first troop test began in 1986, and in 1992 the Panzerfaust 3 was officially introduced. The improved PzF 3-T replaced the original model in the late 1990s. This introduced a dual hollow charge "tandem" warhead to defeat explosive reactive armor. This means that the spike projecting from the warhead also contains an explosive charge to set off reactive armor and free the path to the main armor for the secondary warhead. The latest incarnation of the Panzerfaust 3, the PzF 3-IT-600, can be fired from ranges up to 600 m (2,000 ft) thanks to an advanced computer-assisted sighting and targeting mechanism.

As of 2005, there were two more models in the development or testing stage, both relying on smaller, and therefore lighter, warheads. These were the Rückstoßfreie Granatwaffe RGW (Recoilless Grenade Weapon) in calibres 60 and 90 mm (2.4 and 3.5 in). Both new weapons are expected to help facilitate the transition in German military doctrine from preparation for major tank battles to urban and low-level warfare.

== Principle ==
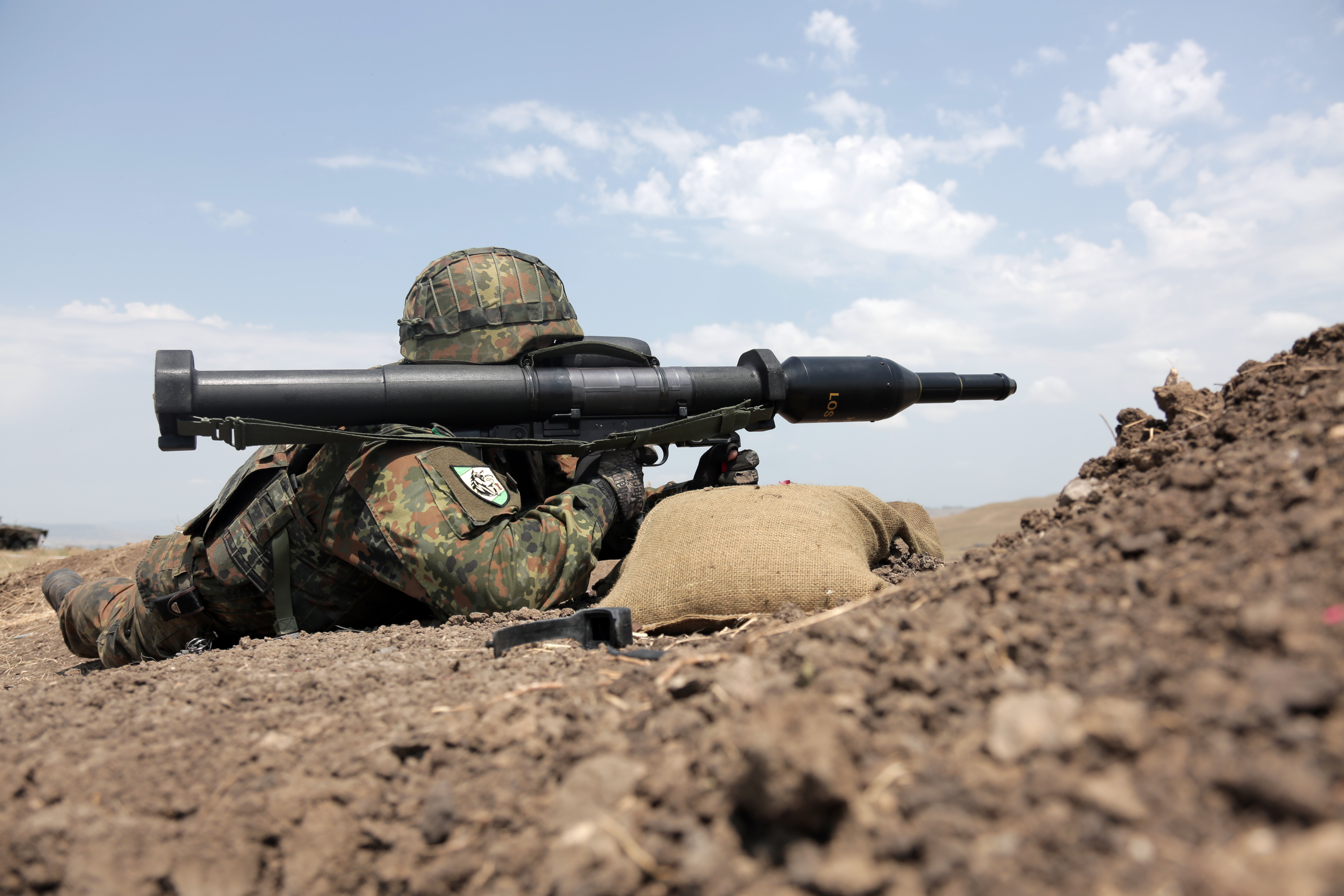
A German Army corporal awaits orders to fire a Panzerfaust 3. Vaziani, Georgia, 2017.

The Panzerfaust 3 series of launchers is a compact, lightweight, shoulder-fired, unguided antitank weapon series. It consists of a disposable canister with a 110 mm (4.3 in) warhead and reusable firing and sighting device. The DM12 and DM12A1 projectiles consist of a shaped-charge warhead and are filled with Octol 7030. The tandem DM22 warheads are made of PBX octogene (c. 95% β-HMX) including the propulsion unit. The penetration performance of the Panzerfaust 3 is due to the shaped charge principle and the quick response of the percussion fuse; the effect on the target does not depend on the impact velocity.

The Panzerfaust 3 is light enough to be carried and fired by one person. However, earlier variants were described as being excessively cumbersome and uncomfortable. Furthermore, the firing mechanism was prone to jamming. It can be fired from enclosed spaces since it does not have a significant backblast. The rear of the tube, filled with plastic granulate, minimizes the blast effect by the so-called recoilless countermass principle.

The booster propellant for the projectile in its tube is ignited by a bolt via a spring mechanism. Once ejected from the launcher, the projectile coasts a safe distance and then the rocket motor is ignited, boosting it to its maximum speed, after which it coasts until impact. The gunner carries at least two rounds, while the assistant grenadier carries another three rounds.

The ergonomic design of the controls, such as handles, launcher, barrel shape and optical sight, is a predefined standard. All controls are easy to handle in all shooting positions (lying, kneeling, or standing). After the weapon is fired, the firing mechanism with the attached optical sight is removed and the barrel thrown away, the firing mechanism being reusable. The effective combat range of the Panzerfaust 3 is from 15 to 300 m (49 to 984 ft) against moving targets and up to 600 m (2,000 ft) against static ones. An optical sight with line pattern fixed to the reusable firing mechanism enables it to engage moving or static targets. To ensure night combat ability, a night-vision device or residual light amplifier can be set up in front of the optical sight.

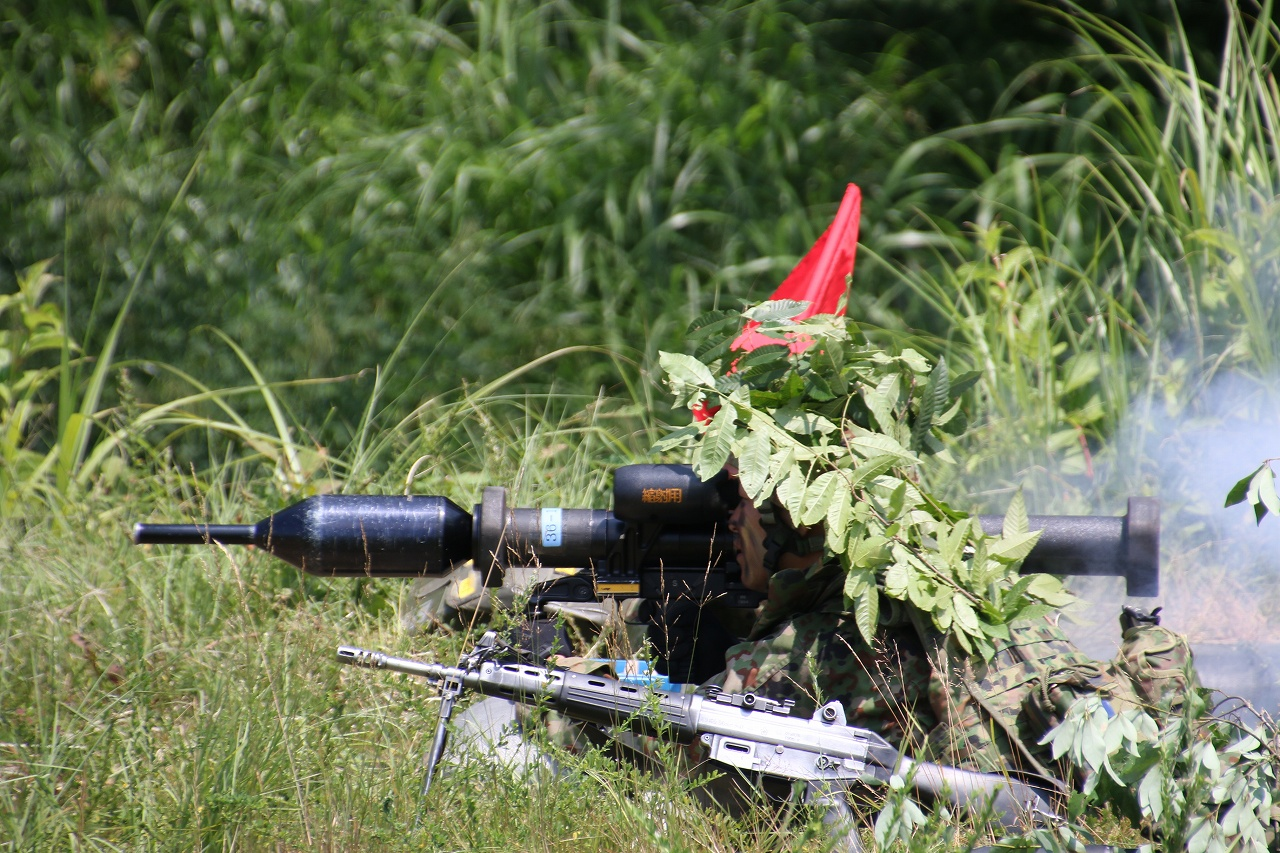
A JGSDF soldier in the 36th Infantry Regiment with the Panzerfaust 3, 2018

As a safety precaution, the built-in fuse for the warhead is released by a safety mechanism. This arms the warhead after a flight distance of approximately 5 m (16 ft). Once armed, the warhead detonates on impact or when the propellant is exhausted, thus safeguarding against future unexploded ordnance hazards.

=== Further development ===
A new sight called Dynarange is being procured as part of the German Infantryman of the Future project. Essentially, this is a computer controlled aiming sight with range finder. It is meant to cope with the fact that some soldiers have had difficulties with the regular sight, as its scope is quite complex to the untrained eye. It would increase the weapon's effective range to 600 m (2,000 ft) against moving and stationary targets. Dynarange is already in service with the Royal Netherlands Marine Corps and the Dutch Army.

== Variants ==
Data

- Panzerfaust 3 (Pzf 3):
  - Original system with 110 mm (4.3 in) HEAT grenade (nose probe for 700 mm (28 in) penetration).
  - Optical day sight limits range to 300 m (980 ft) moving, 400 m (1,300 ft) stationary.
- Panzerfaust 3-T:
  - Upgrade with 3-T tandem HEAT grenade and original day sight.
  - It is effective against targets to 300 m (980 ft) moving, 400 m (1,300 ft) stationary.
  - Night sight is optional.
- Panzerfaust 3-T600:
  - Upgrade adds the IS2000 computer laser day sight with range of out to 600 m (2,000 ft) for moving targets.
  - Advanced tripod mount with a SIRA sensor package uses acoustic detection and IR sensor triggering.
  - It uses the Simrad KN250 series II night sight.
  - Acquisition-to-firing time is 3–4 seconds
- Panzerfaust 3-IT600:
  - Ability upgrade adds more recent 3-IT grenade which penetrates 900 mm (35 in) armor (equals 750 mm (30 in) vs armor behind ERA).
  - Pzf-3-LR/RS, PzF-N version available.
  - Pzf-3-LR uses semi-active laser homing (SAL-H) system and requires a CO_{2} laser guidance unit and SAL-H grenade.
    - Range: 800 m (2,600 ft); armor penetration: 700 mm (28 in).
  - Pzf-N designed to compete for UK NLAW.
- Panzerfaust 3LTW:
  - Light-weight launcher weighing less than 10 kg (22 lb)

== Specifications ==
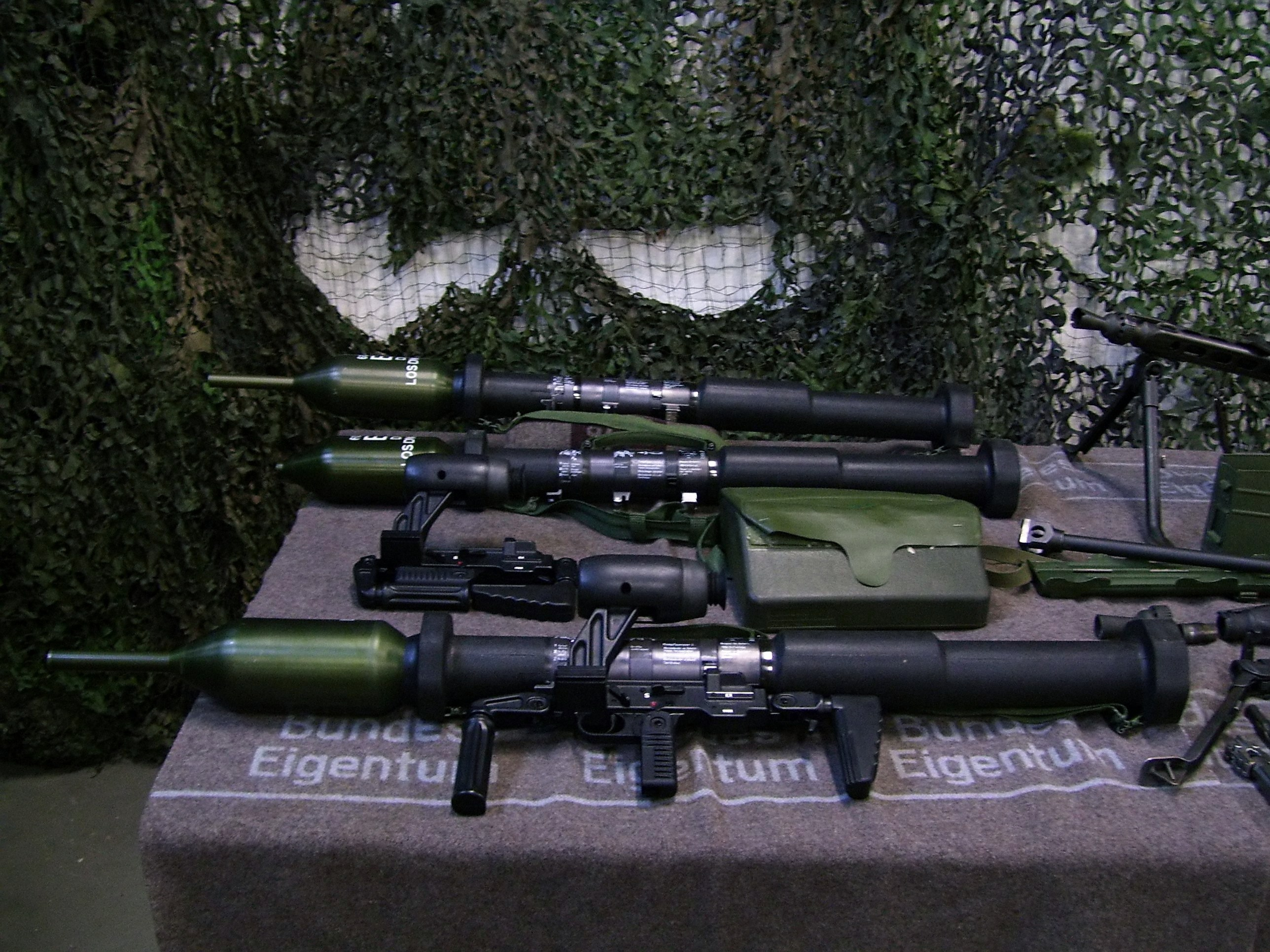
Different PzF3 models in service with the German Feldjäger (military police)

=== PzF 3 ===
Standard anti-tank version with hollow charge warhead.

- Calibre:
  - launcher: 60 mm (2.4 in)
  - warhead: 110 mm (4.3 in)
- Weight:
  - fire-ready weapon: 15.2 kg (33 lb 8 oz)
  - warhead: 3.9 kg (8 lb 10 oz)
  - spare rounds: 12.9 kg (28 lb 7 oz)
- Length: 1,200 mm (3 ft 11 in)
- Muzzle velocity: 160.0 m/s (525 ft/s)
- Highest possible speed: 243.0 m/s (797 ft/s)
- Sights: telescope sights (can be reused)
- Maximum effective range:
  - Stationary targets: 400.0 m (1,312.3 ft)
  - Moving targets: 300.0 m (984.3 ft)
- Minimum effective range: 20.0 m (65.6 ft)
- Penetration ability:
  - Rolled homogeneous armour (RHA): 700 mm (28 in)
  - Concrete: 1,600 mm (5 ft 3 in)

=== PzF 3-IT ===
Improved anti-tank version with tandem hollow charge warhead (designed to penetrate reactive armour)

- Calibre:
  - launcher: 60 mm (2.4 in)
  - warhead: 110 mm (4.3 in)
- Weight:
  - fire-ready weapon: 15.6 kg (34 lb 6 oz)
  - warhead: 3.9 kg (8 lb 10 oz)
  - spare rounds: 13.3 kg (29 lb 5 oz)
- Length: 1,200 mm (3 ft 11 in)
- Muzzle velocity: 152.0 m/s (499 ft/s)
- Highest possible speed: 220.0 m/s (722 ft/s)
- Sights: telescope sights (can be reused)
- Maximum effective range:
  - Stationary targets: 400.0 m (1,312.3 ft)
  - Moving targets: 300.0 m (984.3 ft) (600.0 m (1,968.5 ft) with DYNARANGE sight)
- Minimum effective range: 20.0 m (65.6 ft)
- Penetration ability:
  - RHA: 900 mm (35 in)

=== PzF 3 Bunkerfaust ===
Designed for use against hardened bunkers, lightly armored vehicles & soft targets

- Calibre:
  - launcher: 60 mm (2.4 in)
  - warhead: 110 mm (4.3 in)
- Weight:
  - fire-ready weapon: 15.6 kg (34 lb 6 oz)
  - warhead: 3.9 kg (8 lb 10 oz)
  - spare rounds: 13.3 kg (29 lb 5 oz)
- Length: 1,200 mm (3 ft 11 in)
- Muzzle velocity: 149.0 m/s (489 ft/s)
- Highest possible speed: 212.0 m/s (696 ft/s)
- Sights: telescope sights (can be reused)
- Maximum effective range: 300.0 m (984.3 ft)
- Minimum effective range: 20.0 m (65.6 ft)
- Manufacturer: Dynamit-Nobel, Germany
- Penetration capacity:
  - RHA: 110 mm (4.3 in)
  - Concrete: 360 mm (14 in)
  - Sandbags: 1,300 mm (4 ft 3 in)

=== Ammunition ===
- PzF 3:
  - HEAT-125, HEAT-90, HESH, MZ-110 (Multipurpose-Frag), Illumination, IR Smoke, Smoke. Flight range: 600 m (2,000 ft); Penetration: 800 mm (31 in)+
  - 3LW-HESH, 3LWD Multipurpose PZF-3 (110mm HEAT-original rd), BASTEG Bunker Busters. Flight range: 300–400 m (980–1,310 ft); Penetration: 700 mm (28 in)+
- PzF 3-IT:
  - Pzf-N (Tandem HEAT). Flight range: 600 m (2,000 ft); Penetration: 900 mm (35 in)+
  - Pzf-3-LR (Tandem SAL-H). Flight range: 800 m (2,600 ft); Penetration: 700 mm (28 in)+
  - Other munitions as noted above.

== Operators ==
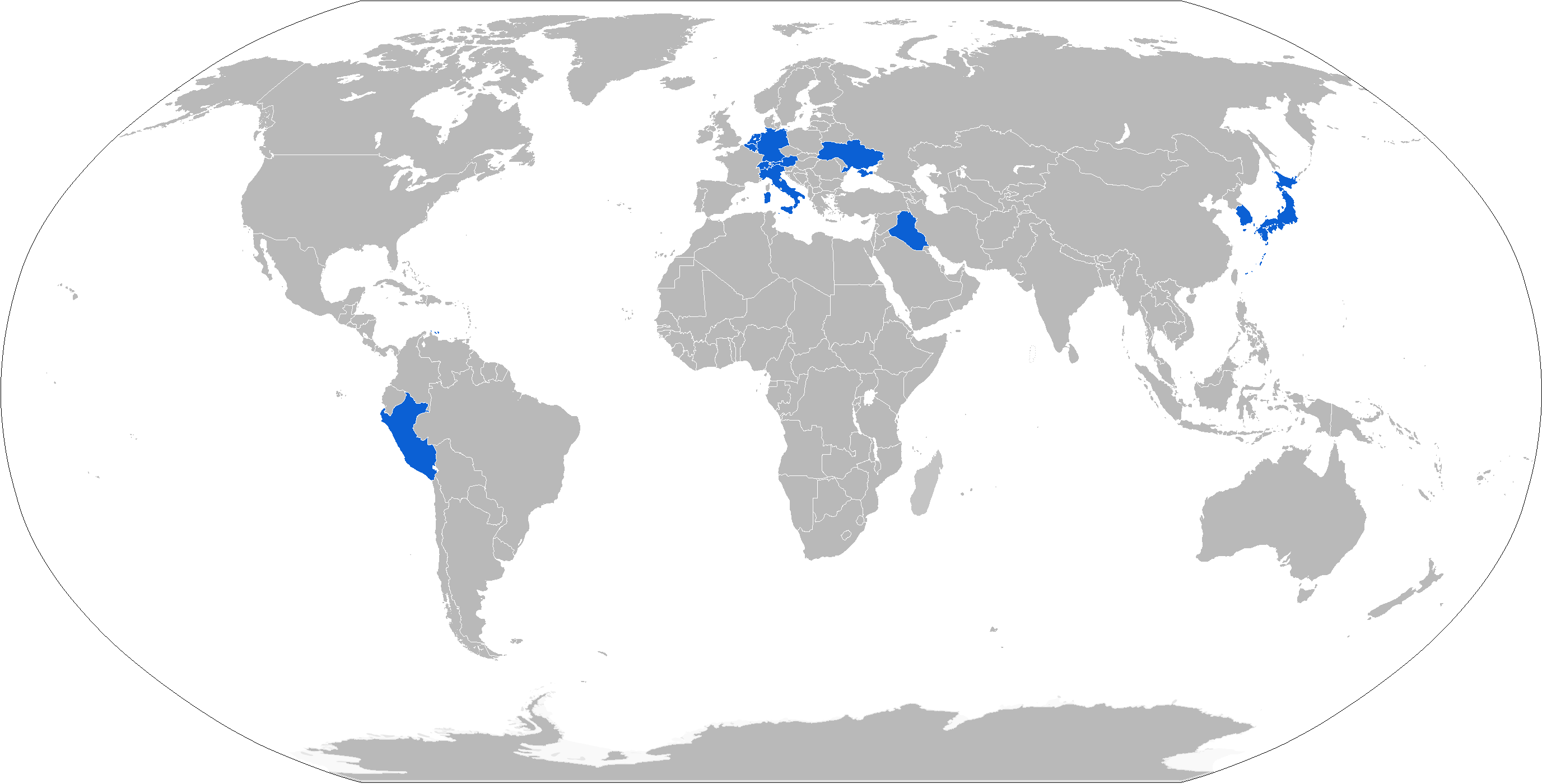
A map with Panzerfaust 3 operators in blue

=== Current operators ===
Belgium
Germany
Introduced in the German Armed Forces in 1992.
Additional orders all over its lifetime, among which, an order for 3,500 munitions Panzerfaust 3-IT DM72A1 (improved tandem) anti-tank weapons in 2022.
Iraq / Kurdistan
Used in Iraq, by the Peshmerga 400 launchers and 5,000 rockets
Italy
2,000 launchers with 17,000 rockets delivered since middle '90s; 7,100 Panzerfaust 3-T (PZF3-T) delivered in 2007.
Japan
Kosovo
Ordered in December 2025.
Mauritius
Netherlands
Ammunition used:
- HEAT-RA (DM12A2)
- HEAT-IT-RA (DM72)
- HEAT-MP-RA (DM32)
- TP-RA (DM18A1)
The Netherlands are replacing the Panzerfaust 3 with the Carl Gustaf M4 (ordered in 2025).
Peru
1,700 Panzerfaust 3 rockets and 181 launchers.
South Korea
Switzerland
Selected in 1990, acquired with the Armament Programme 1991, and 750 simulators acquired with the Armament Programme 1993.
It was produced locally under licence.
Ukraine
Supplied by Germany and the Netherlands following the 2022 Russian invasion of Ukraine.

=== Former operators ===
Austria

== See also ==
- PzF 44 – (West Germany)
- PSRL-1 – (United States)
- 55 S 55 – (Finland)
- Alcotán-100 – (Spain)
- Armbrust – (West Germany)
- MATADOR – (Israel, Singapore)
- Carl Gustaf – (Sweden)
- RGW 110
