= 55 S 55 =

Finnish anti-tank weapon

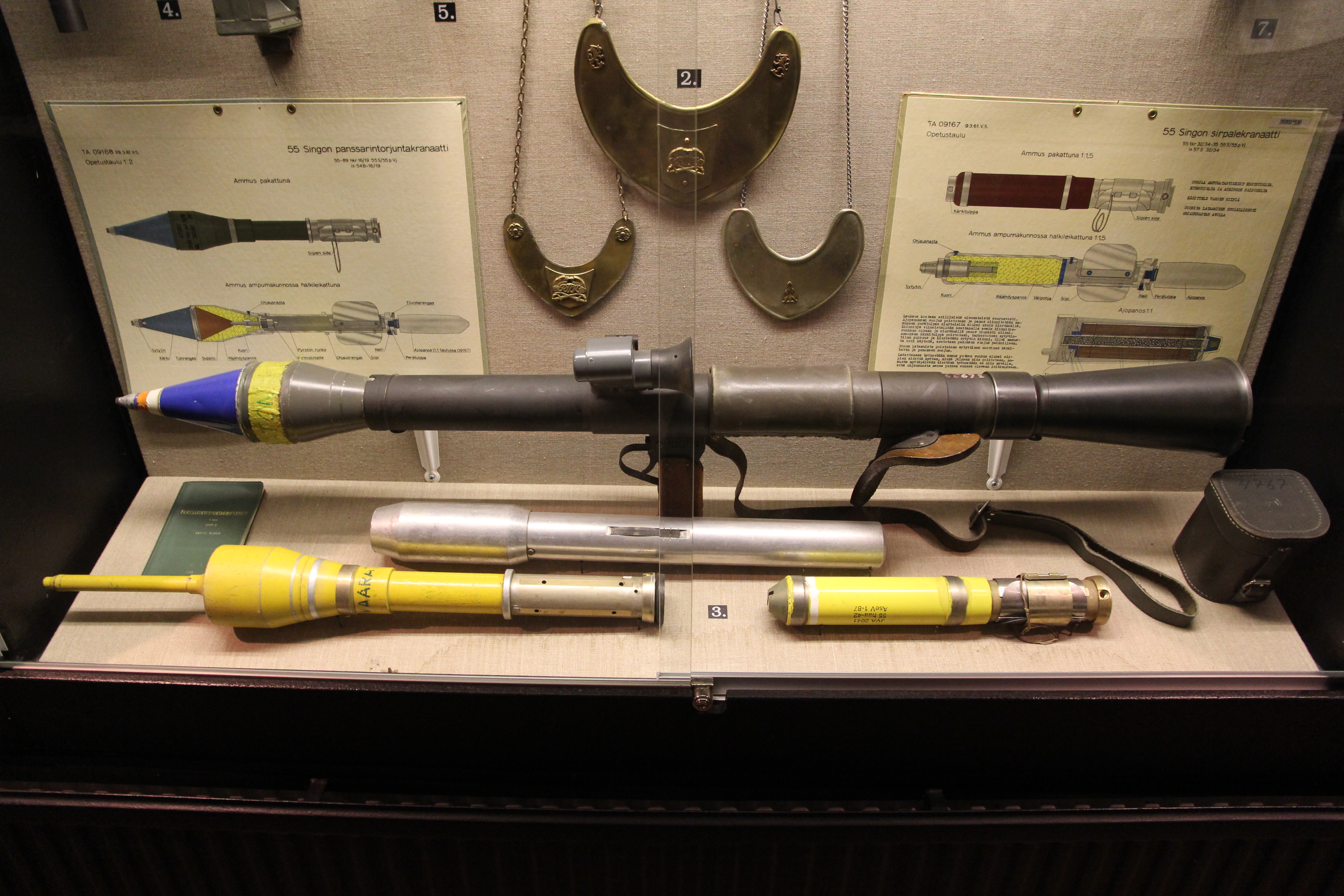
- 55 S 55 with training ammunition
- Type: Anti-tank weapon
- Place of origin: Finland

Service history
- In service: 1955–1990s
- Used by: Finland

Production history
- Designer: Esko Puronto; Kaarlo Sarkimo
- Manufacturer: FDF Vammaskoski factory Ammus Oy
- Produced: 1954–1970s
- No. built: >10,000

Specifications
- Mass: 8 kg (18 lb)
- Length: 940 mm (3 ft 1 in)
- Cartridge: HEAT grenade with 300 mm (12 in) RHA penetration
- Caliber: 55 mm (2.2 in) (tube); 88 mm (3.5 in) (HEAT round)
- Action: Single shot
- Rate of fire: 3 to 5 rounds per minute
- Muzzle velocity: 160 m/s (520 ft/s)
- Effective firing range: 300 m (330 yd)
- Maximum firing range: 700 m (770 yd)
- Sights: Optical, 4x

55 S 55 (from Finnish 55 millimetrin sinko vuodelta 1955, '55 millimetre recoilless anti-tank weapon model 1955'), colloquially kevyt sinko and nicknamed Nyrkki, was a Finnish recoilless anti-tank weapon from the mid-1950s. The 55 S 55 was designed by a Finnish Defence Forces team led by MSc, Capt Esko Puronto, and it was manufactured by FDF's Vammaskoski factory (now part of Finnish state military industrial enterprise Patria).

== History ==
During the later stages of World War II, Finland received large shipments of German Panzerfaust (F1 and F2) and Panzerschreck. These weapons were used after the war, but soon the need for modern replacement arose.

After the World War II, short-range anti-tank weaponry was seen as the most important anti-tank weaponry by the Finnish Defence Forces, and it was seen that the further the short-range weaponry could be developed, the less there would be need for the more expensive long-range weaponry. Finland's forested areas were seen as optimal terrain for light, highly portable anti-tank weapons, and this supported the efficiency of such short-range weaponry. FDF Capt Martti Frick also popularised a doctrine that the short-range weaponry should be used also offensively, not just as self-defence, contrary to the doctrine of the German colonel Hermann Oehmichen during the World War II.

The FDF committee for anti-tank weaponry pointed out that the Panzerfaust, Panzerschreck and bazooka had been the most successful anti-tank weapons in the World War II. The American bazooka was seen as the most successful and advanced of the three. FDF however had already developed venturi effect recoil dampers to the Panzerschreck during the WWII to lengthen its range, and they were planned for the Panzerfaust as well, which were also tested in the early 1950s. Rocket-propelled grenades (which have an in-flight burning rocket projectile) were however viewed with prejudice, as the Panzerschreck was considered by FDF as having a poor accuracy, which was attributed to its rocket projectile.

When the proper development for a multi-use launcher which used the recoilless gun principle of the Panzerfaust began, it was led by two different teams, FDF HQ firearms division development team and privately, by a private company Raikka Oy. The FDF development team was led by MSc, Capt Esko Puronto and the Raikka Oy team by Helsinki University professor of ballistics, DSc, Lt Col Ilmari Liikkanen. Both designs were recoilless guns; the FDF design was based on a venturi effect recoil damper, while the Raikka design was based on an ejected counter-mass to make the launcher recoilless.

The Raikka design was criticised by the FDF development team as obsolete and not used by other countries, as well as making the launch tube wear out quicker. The leader of the FDF team Puronto commented, that he "would support the solution offered by Liikkanen, if it had more pros than cons". The Raikka design would have had been safer to use in fortified positions as well as indoors due to the minimal backblast, but minimising the backblast was not a primary concern. The counter-mass made the projectiles of the Raikka design also heavier than those of the 55 S 55.

The 55 S 55 launch tube was developed solely by the FDF development team, but the recoil damper was designed by Kaarlo Sarkimo of the Ammus Oy.

FDF chose the FDF development team design based on technological principles, as well as being in possession of the intellectual property. Ammus Oy licensed the recoil damper to FDF for production to FDF use, so FDF could manufacture the weapon without any limitations. Commercial designs (such as the Raikka weapon) were seen problematic, as they could not be manufactured by FDF without negotiations by the intellectual property holder.

FDF was initially very satisfied with the 55 S 55, and in the 1960s it was considered to be at the pinnacle of the development of anti-tank weapons worldwide. However, over time the opinion on the 55 S 55 grew more negative as the weapon grew dated, and FDF could address some design flaws and manufacturing decisions which compromised the durability and safety of the weapon; however during the assessment of the criteria for the project, Capt Frick had viewed that that manufacturing and design should cut short some aspects to bring down the manufacturing costs, so the launchers could be widely distributed. The 55 S 55 was also considered too heavy in the later reviews.

Simplified backup sights were planned to be included in the design, but were never incorporated in the produced launchers.

The 55 S 55 was manufactured until the 1970s, and manufacturing ceased after the FDF quota for the launchers had been fulfilled; over 10 000 launchers had been made. It was eventually removed from FDF service in the 1990s.

== Design ==
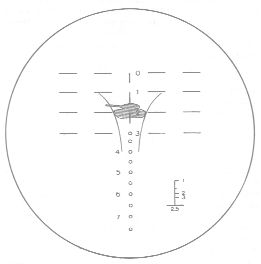
Sight picture of the 55 S 55 NE sight.

The main principle in the 55 S 55 is that of a smoothbore recoilless gun with a venturi effect recoil damper. It is developed based on the Panzerfaust, and is similar to the Swedish (Carl Gustaf 8.4cm recoilless rifle), German (Panzerfaust 2) and Soviet (RPG-2) designs of the time, though its design was not influenced by them. Like the Carl Gustaf, the projectiles of the 55 S 55 are not rocket propelled; all of the forward momentum is gained from the propellant charge, which burns immediately at the launch.

The 88 millimetre HEAT grenade weighs 2.3 kg, and is capable of penetrating 300 millimetres of RHA +/- 40 millimetres. The fuse is able to function at as small as a 20 degree angle of impact. The longest recommendable distance for stationary armour targets is 300 metres and to moving targets 200 metres. 55 millimetre fragmentation and incendiary WP grenades as well as illumination rounds and 55 millimetre solid training ammunition were also available. The fragmentation and training ammunition weighed also 2.3 kg, and had the same 160 m/s muzzle velocity as the HEAT grenade. If capped, the fragmentation grenade can penetrate obstacles such as light doors, bushes and windows before exploding. These can be shot up to 700 metres against stationary targets. A rifle calibre practice barrel chambered in 7.62×54mmR could be installed inside the launching tube.

The backblast from the 55 S 55 is lethal or highly dangerous up to 7 metres; gravel, small rocks and other small objects could be propelled up to 15 metres behind. The gunner should have at least two metre clearance behind, so the backblast wouldn't be deflected back to the shooter; shooting from an enclosure was forbidden.

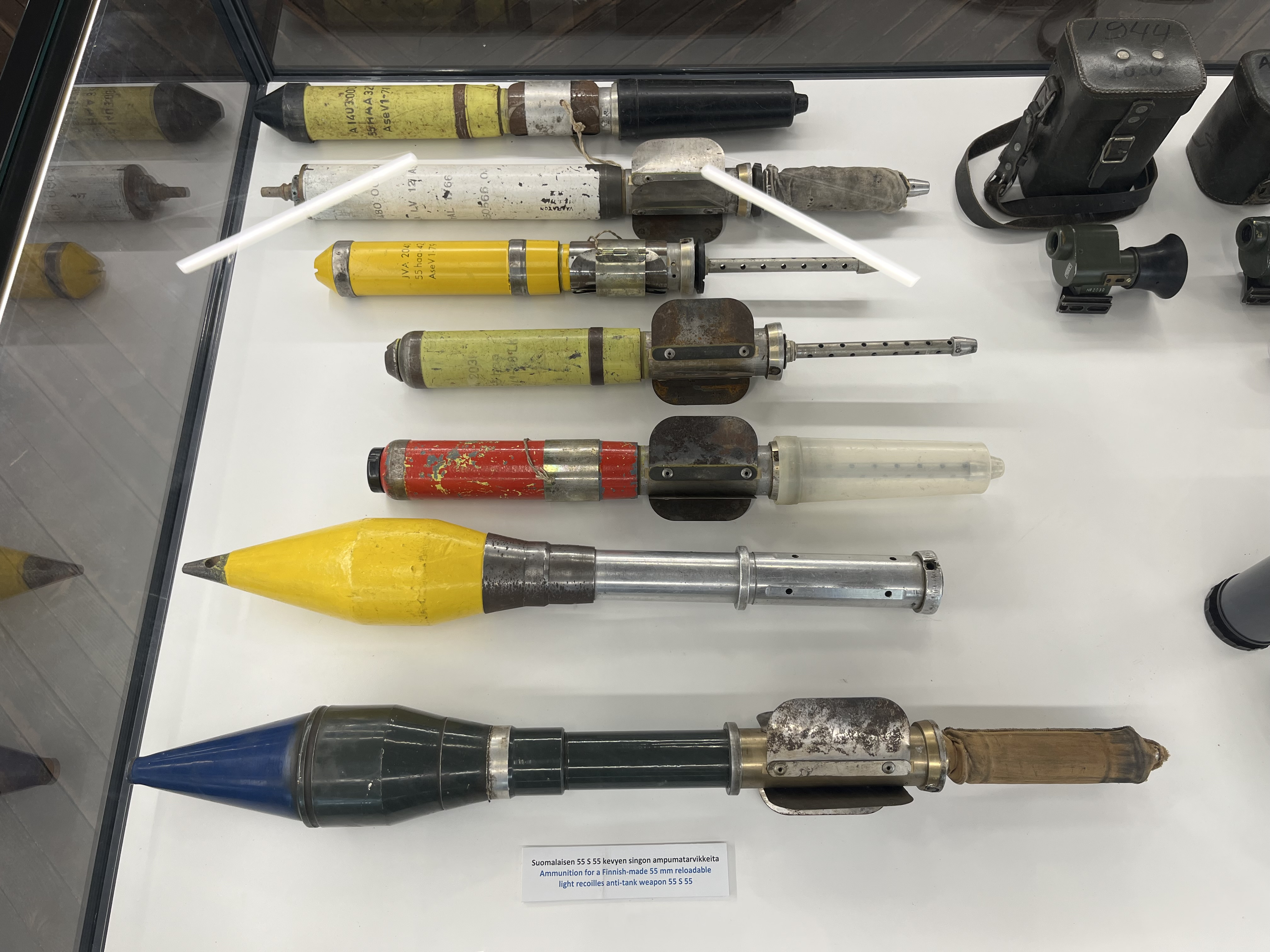
Different types of ammunition for the 55 S 55.

The sights are optical; three types of different optical sights exist (Kr, D and NE), of which two (Kr and D) share the same reticle; the NE sight has a stadiametric rangefinder reticle. There's provision for illuminating the reticle and the stadia marks in the NE sight.

The 55 S 55 was the standard anti-tank weapon of the Finnish Army from the late 1950s but has been phased out since the 1980s giving way to M72 LAW and Apilas. The weapon was operated by a two-man team, loader and the gunner.

The main disadvantage of the weapon was low muzzle velocity resulting in an arched trajectory. This exposed the grenade to wind conditions and branches in covered terrain. Also the smoke and noise when firing could reveal the location making the user(s) a target. The weapon had a tendency to nod on launch requiring careful handling.

== Users ==
=== Former users ===
- Finland

== See also ==
- Carl Gustaf 8.4 cm recoilless rifle – (Sweden)
- M67 recoilless rifle – (United States)
- RPG-2 – (Soviet Union)
- Panzerfaust – (Nazi Germany)
- Panzerfaust 2 – (West Germany)
- Panzerfaust 3 – (West Germany)
- PSRL-1 – (United States)
- Type 69 RPG – (China)
