= Type 69 RPG =

Norinco Type 69 RPG
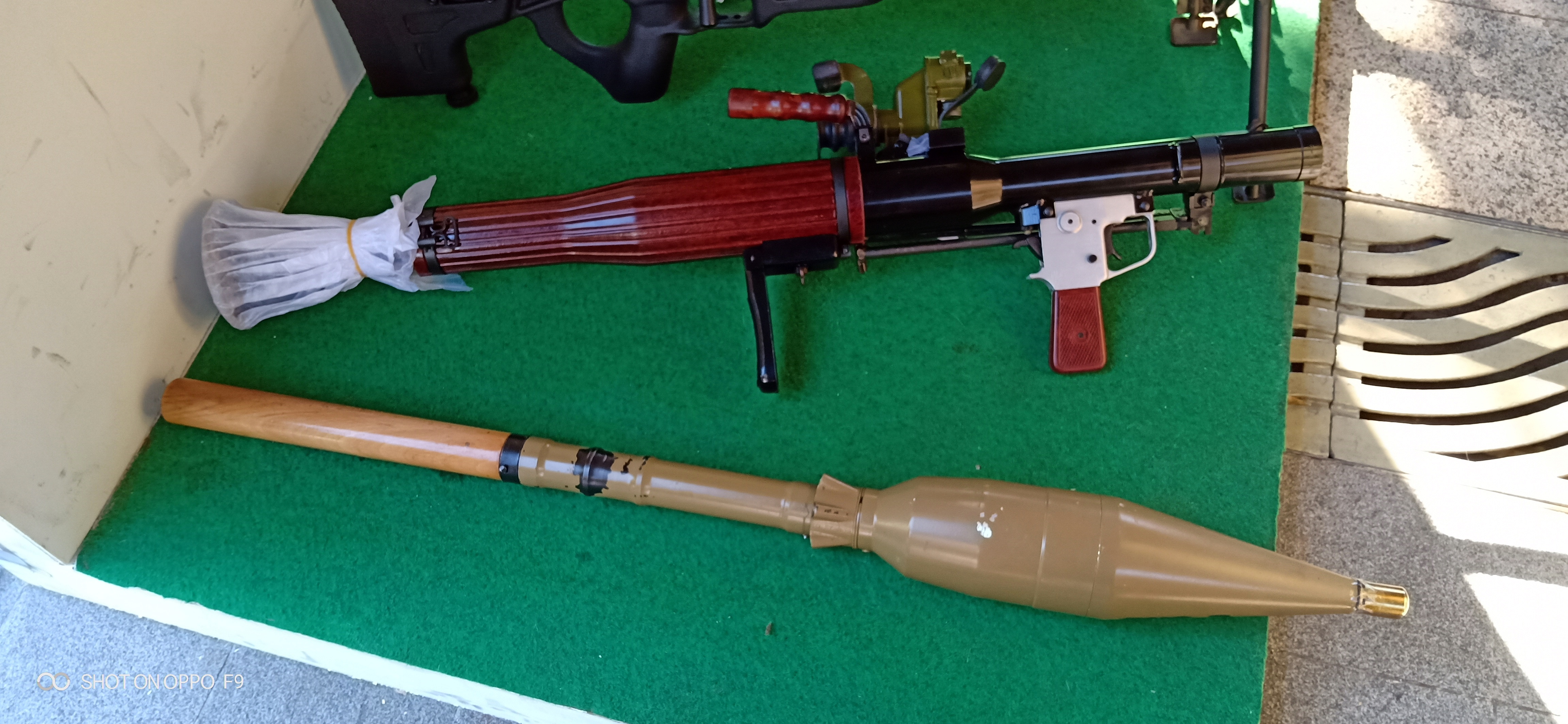
- A Type 69 RPG
- Type: Anti-tank, anti-personnel, RPG
- Place of origin: China

Service history
- In service: 1970–present
- Used by: See Operators
- Wars: Vietnam War; Laotian Civil War; Cambodian Civil War; Mozambican War of Independence; Rhodesian Bush War; Angolan Civil War; Sino-Vietnamese War; Lebanese Civil War; Soviet–Afghan War; Iran–Iraq War; Sri Lankan Civil War; Somali Civil War; War in North-West Pakistan; Iraq War; Cambodian–Thai border dispute Kivu conflict Sudanese conflict in South Kordofan and Blue Nile; Ethnic violence in South Sudan; Boko Haram insurgency Syrian Civil War; Tigray War; Myanmar Civil War; 2025 Cambodia–Thailand border conflict

Production history
- Designer: Norinco
- Designed: 1970
- Manufacturer: Norinco
- Produced: 1970–present
- Variants: Type 69-I

Specifications
- Mass: 5.6 kg (12.3 lb)
- Length: 910 mm (35.8 in)
- Crew: 1 or 2, depending on situation
- Caliber: 40 mm (1.57") barrel 85mm warhead
- Effective firing range: 200 m (656 ft)
- Maximum firing range: 600 m (1,968 ft)
- Feed system: one round per shot
- Sights: Iron sights. Infrared and night vision sights possible

The Type 69 85mm RPG (Chinese: 69式40毫米火箭筒), made by Norinco, is a Chinese variant of the Soviet RPG-7. First introduced in 1972, the Type 69 is a common individual anti-tank weapon in service with the PLA. More advanced grenade rounds were developed in the 1980s and 1990s to meet the requirements of modern battlefields. Eventually, the aging Type 69 RPG family was replaced by more modern anti-tank weapon systems developed by China such as the Type 89 and Type 08.

== Origin ==
=== History ===
China first obtained the RPG-2 85mm anti-tank RPG in the early 1950s, and began to build domestic copies in 1956 under the designation Type 56. However, the rapid development of the new generation main battle tanks (MBTs) in the early 1960s posed new threats to the PLA, which was later proven in the 1969 Sino-Soviet border conflict.

Because the Type 56 was unable to penetrate the armour of the new generation Soviet tanks such as the T-62, the PLA desperately needed a new individual anti-tank weapon to replace the aging Type 56. Reverse-engineering of the RPG-7 began in the early 1960s, and demonstrations were made to senior PLA officials in 1964. The Chinese copy of the RPG-7, designated Type 69, received its design certificate in 1970.

The weapon entered service with the PLA in the mid-1970s, and took part in the 1979 Sino-Vietnam border conflict to provide platoon-level anti-personnel and anti-obstacle fire support. Its performance was highly praised by the troops.

=== Status ===
The production of the Type 69 RPG stopped in the mid-1980s when an advanced version, Type 69-I was introduced by Norinco. As the weapon became less effective in modern land battlefield, the Type 69 RPG is being gradually replaced by the PF-89 80mm anti-tank grenade launcher.

As well as being equipped by the PLA, the Type 69 has also been exported in significant numbers to many foreign customers, including the Mujahideen in Afghanistan under the covert co-operations between China and the CIA in the 1980s against the Soviet Union.

== Ammunition ==
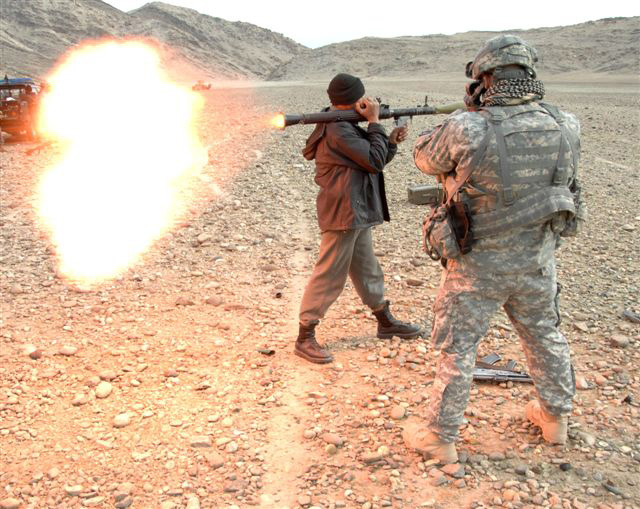
Afghan National Police officer fires a Type 69 RPG round at a special mission conducted by U.S. Army.

Although the design of the grenade launcher has not changed significantly since it was introduced in the 1970s, many new types of grenade rounds have been developed over the years to provide enhanced capabilities, including:

=== Type 69 HEAT ===
Basic, high-explosive anti-tank grenade introduced in the PLA during the 1970s with the Type 69. Phased out of PLA service.

=== Type 69-I hollow charge high-explosive anti-tank ===
Standard HEAT grenade developed for the PLA in the 1980s. The hollow warhead was created with improved armour-piercing capabilities.

=== Type 69-II HEAT ===
The same as the Type 69-I HEAT grenade, except that it is improved to defeat modern armoured vehicles that are equipped with anti-tank missile plating.

=== Type 69-III HEAT ===
The same as the Type 69-II, increased range and further improved armour-piercing abilities.

=== Type 84 HEAT ===
Made in the 1980s as a lighter warhead with the ability to be fired from long range with claims that the rocket is not affected by side winds. Usable with both Type 69 and 69-I rocket launchers.

=== Type 69 75mm airburst anti-personnel high-explosive (HE) ===
Created for anti-personnel purposes. This is mostly meant to combat against entrenched forces since the rocket, after gaining impact on the ground, bounces to a height of around 2m then airbursts over the target area, scattering about 800 anti-personnel steel balls over a lethal radius of 15m.

=== HE/HEAT ===
Used for anti-armour and anti-personnel combat. Even though it has 1,500 prefabricated fragments which scatter over a 20m radius on detonation, the rocket retains its anti-tank capabilities.

=== Anti-personnel high-explosive incendiary (HEI) ===
Created for use in certain environments such as jungles and mountains, it has 900 steel balls and 2,000 to 3,000 incendiary pellets that scatter over a 15m radius on detonation.

=== Tandem-warhead anti-tank grenade ===
Thought to have been used in the 1990s, it is meant to penetrate vehicles with explosive reactive armor. Even though it can not defeat most modern vehicles, lighter vehicles such as APCs and AFVs can be destroyed with this rocket.

=== Illumination grenade ===
Equipped with a small parachute to suspend it in mid air while being used, its effective range is 600m with the braking ring and 1,500m without it.

== Operators ==
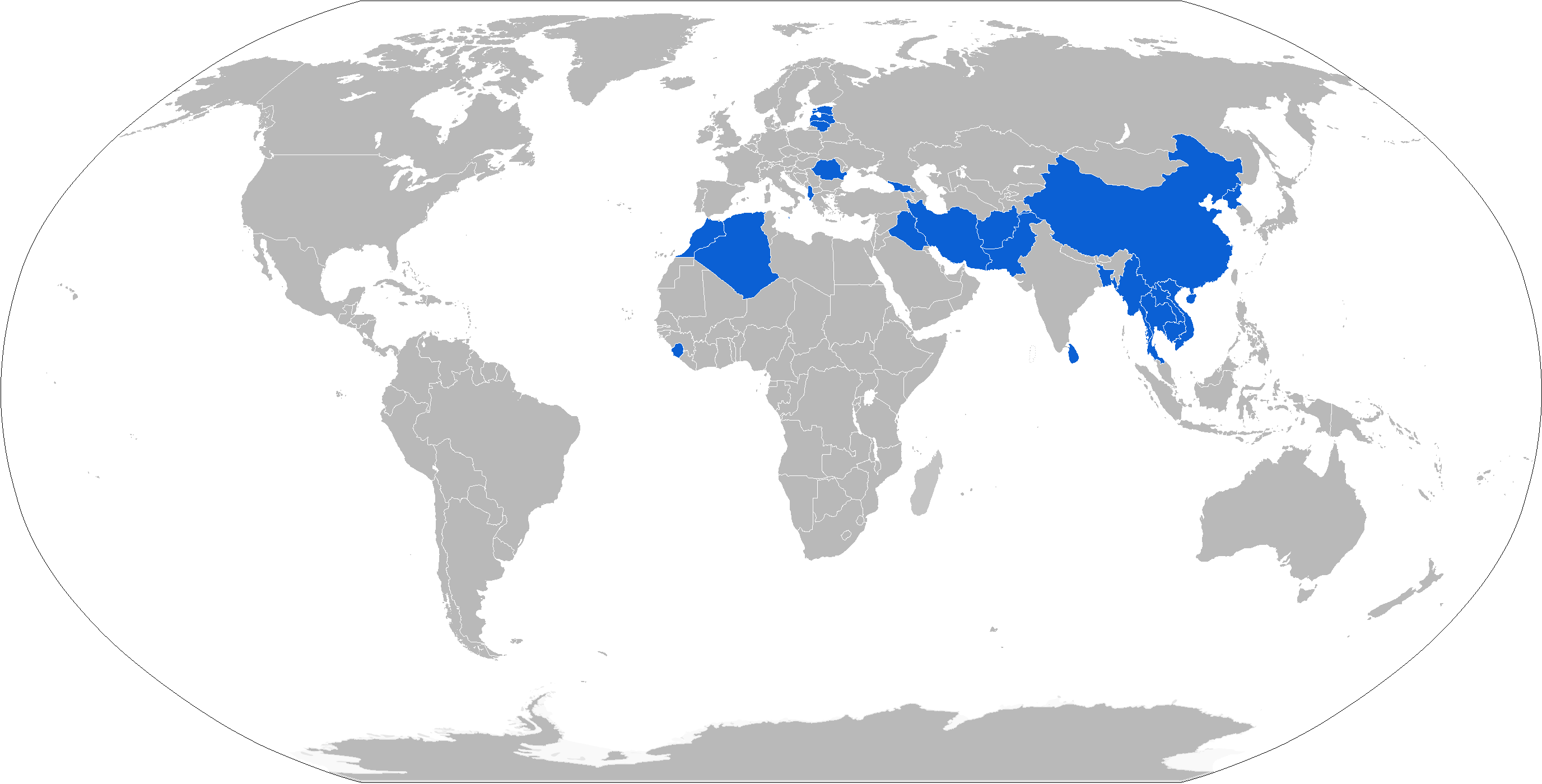
Map with Type 69 RPG operators in blue.

- Afghanistan
- Bangladesh
- Burundi
- Central African Republic
- China
  - People's Liberation Army Ground Force
  - People's Armed Police
- Congo-Kinshasa
- Eritrea
- Iran
- Iraq
- (Libya) Libyan National Army
- Malta: Armed Forces of Malta
- Morocco
- Niger
- Pakistan: Paramilitary forces
- Philippines: 60 Type 69s provided as of October 2019.
- Somalia
- Sri Lanka
- Sudan
- Ukraine: Reportedly used by Ukrainian troops since 2023.
- Zimbabwe

=== Former ===
- Estonia: Type 69s are old stocks remaining, not in current use.
- Soviet Union: Spetsnaz were equipped with captured Type 69s in Afghanistan.

=== Non-State Actors ===
- Democratic Forces for the Liberation of Rwanda
- FRELIMO: Supplied to them during the Independence War.
- Hizbul Islam
- Lebanese Communist Party/Popular Guard
- Ogaden National Liberation Front
- People's Defense Force
- South Sudan Democratic Movement
- Tigray Defense Forces
- Viet Cong

== See also ==
- 55 S 55
- Yasin - RPG developed by Hamas.
- Bazalt – Russian manufacturer of the RPG-7 & RPG-29.
- PSRL-1
- PF-89 and DZJ-08 next generation man-portable rocket launcher and recoilless gun developed by China, succeeding Type 69.
