= PSRL-1 =

Precision Shoulder-fired Rocket Launcher-1
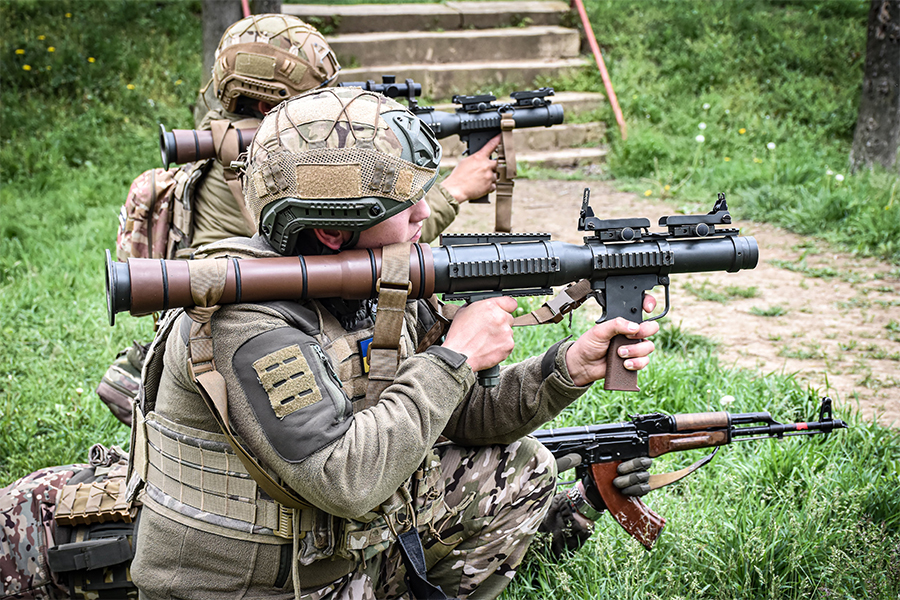
- Type: Rocket-propelled grenade launcher
- Place of origin: United States

Service history
- In service: 2017–present
- Used by: See § Users
- Wars: Russo-Ukrainian War

Production history
- Designer: AirTronic USA
- Manufacturer: AirTronic USA

Specifications
- Mass: 14 lb (6.4 kg)
- Length: 36 in (915 mm)
- Caliber: 40 mm (1.6 in)
- Rate of fire: 3–4 rounds per minute
- Effective firing range: Up to 850 m (2,790 ft)+ (round and sight dependent)
- Maximum firing range: 1,200 m (3,900 ft) (round and sight dependent)
- Sights: 3.5×24 PSRL optical sight; 3×24 Sightmark Wolfhound Prismatic Weapon Sight with custom RPG BDC Reticle; 3.5×35 Trijicon ACOG TA11 Scope with Custom RPG BDC Reticle; Standard flip-up back-up Iron Sights; 12× Pulsar Trail XP-50 Thermal Sight (800 m (2,600 ft) range); 10× Pulsar Trail XP-30 Thermal Sight (500 m (1,600 ft) range)

The Precision Shoulder-fired Rocket Launcher-1, also known as the PSRL-1, is a modified American copy of the Soviet/Russian RPG-7 shoulder-fired rocket-propelled grenade launcher developed by AirTronic USA.

The PSRL-1 is primarily manufactured for US-allied nations who are accustomed to Soviet-style weapons and international export.

== History ==
In 2009, AirTronic USA revealed their modernized RPG-7, named the RPG-7USA. It was later developed to the PSRL-1.

The weapon was a Program of Record in the United States Special Operations Command by 2015, and the PSRL-1 entered production by mid-2016. The rocket launcher was shown at the AUSA exhibition in 2015 with the PSRL-1 and the GS-777 being displayed.

The first confirmed sales were to the Peruvian Army in 2013.

=== Combat Use ===
Ukrainian troops used it for the first time in a conflict during the 2022 Russian invasion of Ukraine. At least one was captured by Russian forces.

== Specifications ==
The PSRL-1 or RPG-7USA is fitted with a MIL-STD-1913 quad-rail for mounting accessories, is compatible with mil-spec M4 carbine–style pistol grips and stocks, and is compatible with all existing RPG-7 ammunition.

The PSRL-1 is typically equipped with a proprietary 3.5× optical sight with an illuminated etched reticle, or an EOTech sight with a holographic reticle.

The manufacturer claims a 90% hit probability at 800 meters (2,600 ft) with the standard magnified sight, although it is reportedly accurate at ranges from 900–1,200 m (3,000–3,900 ft).

The PSRL-1 is made of 4140/4150 ordnance-grade steel for a 1,000-round lifespan, weighs 14 lb (6.35 kg) unloaded and without optics, and can separate into two pieces for compact carry.

AirTronic also developed a more advanced GS-777/PSRL-2 model made of a high-strength polymer that reduced total launcher weight to 7.77 lb (3.52 kg), though the weight later increased to 9.5 lb (4.3 kg) to further improve durability and life cycle.

The lighter model has a top rail and uses a new trigger group. The center of gravity has moved forward to compensate for the muzzle weight. It comes standard with the TA11 Advanced Combat Optical Gunsight (ACOG).

After AirTronic was acquired by Daycraft Systems, the PSRL-1s were renamed as Daycraft Recoilless Precision Rifles (RePR-G7) separated into 3 models: 30 inches (762 mm) long and 7.5 pounds (3.4 kg) heavy G730, 30 inches (762 mm) long and 8 pounds (3.6 kg) heavy G730QD and 36 inches (910 mm) long and 14 pounds (6.4 kg) heavy G736.

=== Ammunition ===
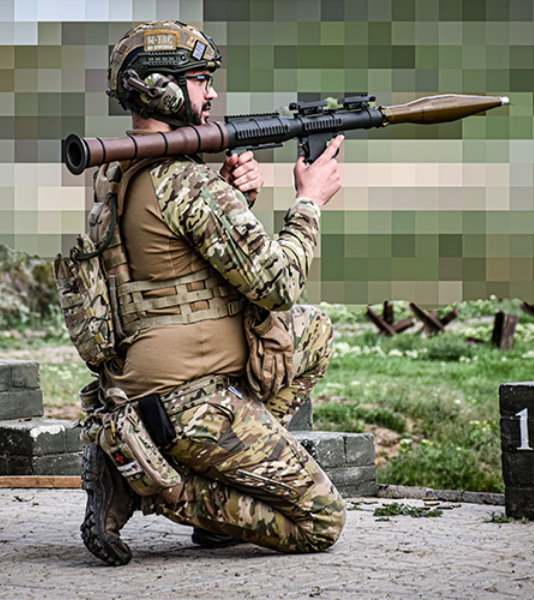
Ukrainian National Guard soldier with the PSRL-1, 2024

Although AirTronic launchers are compatible with Soviet RPG-7 rocket ammunition, AirTronic also manufactures their own modernized RPG-7 rocket ammunition within the United States, and fully owns the intellectual property of their rocket ammunition.

Improvements have been made focusing on the fuzing, reliability, robustness, and manufacturing quality per United States Department of Defense standards.

The warhead fuze features a dual safe and arm arrangement for improved handling safety, and the rocket motor ignitor fuze has been redesigned to improve motor ignition reliability.

AirTronic recommends the use of their ammunition in their launchers to achieve the advertised level of performance.

Inert training variants which match the ballistics of live ammunition are also available, allowing for safe training at a reduced cost. The inert warheads of training variants are filled with marking compound so that the impact of the round can be observed from afar.

There are three variants of ammunition:

- SR-H1, a 3.82 kg (8.4 lb) 93 mm (3.7 in) high-explosive anti-tank (HEAT) warhead that is able to penetrate 500 mm (20 in) rolled homogeneous armor (RHA) and has tracer ability. Its effective range is at 500 m (1,600 ft), while maximum range can reach up to 800 m (2,600 ft). The fire rate is between 4 and 6 rounds per minute.
- SR-T1, a 3.82 kg (8.4 lb) 93 mm (3.7 in) inert warhead is a training round and cannot penetrate armor, though it does retain tracer ability. Its effective range is at 500 m (1,600 ft), while maximum range can reach up to 800 m (2,600 ft). The rate of fire is between 4 and 6 rpm.
- SR-T2, a 2.12 kg (4.7 lb) 70 mm inert warhead is also a training round and cannot penetrate armor, though it does retain tracer ability. Its effective range is at 800 m (2,600 ft), while maximum range can reach up to 1,200 m (3,900 ft). The rate of fire is between 4 and 6 rpm.

In 2015, it was reported that new guided rocket ammunition could extend the effective range up to 2,000 meters (6,600 ft). No such ammunition has been presented.

=== Accessories ===
In conjunction with the weapon, the complete PSRL system includes different sighting systems, spare parts, slings, cases, ammo bags, and bipods for customization and transport. Additionally, AirTronic offers various optional Cerakote coatings.

== Users ==
- Peru
- Turkey
- Ukraine
- United States

== See also ==
- 55 S 55
- RPG-7
- Type 69 RPG
