= Shoulder-fired missile =

Weapon systems usable by a single person

Shoulder-fired weapons system
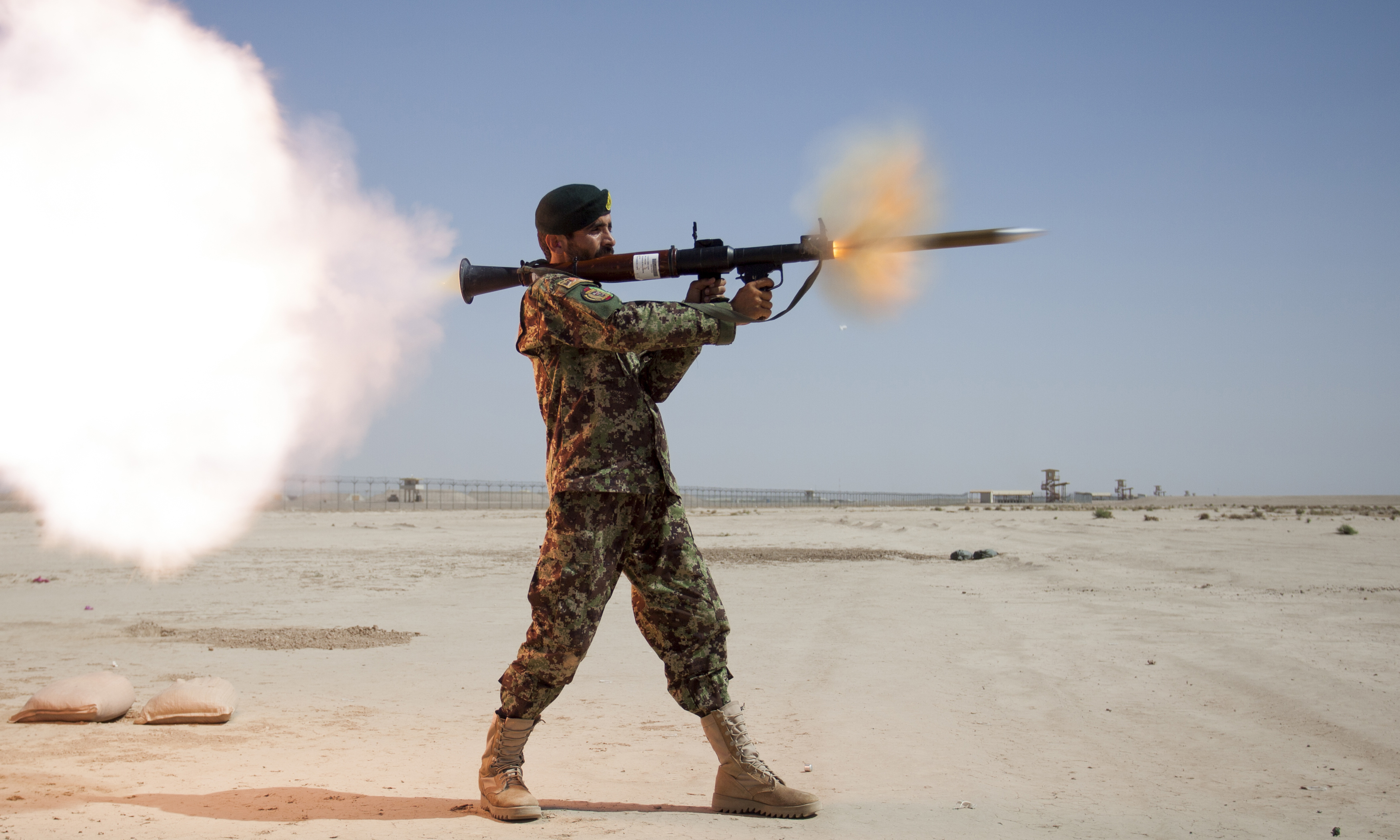
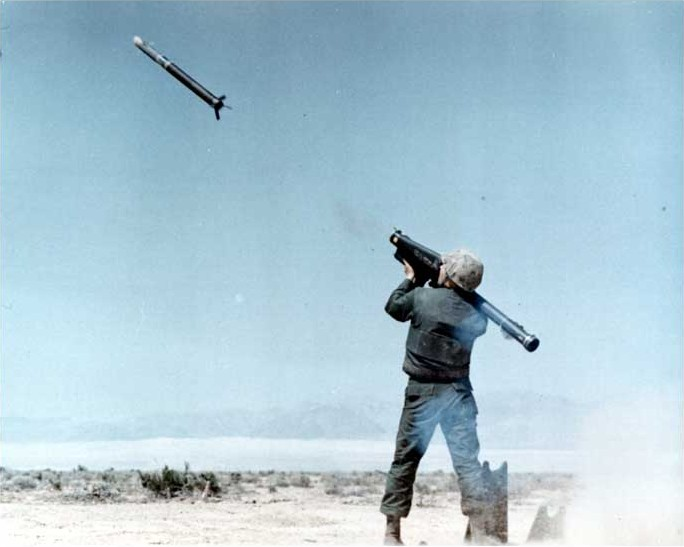
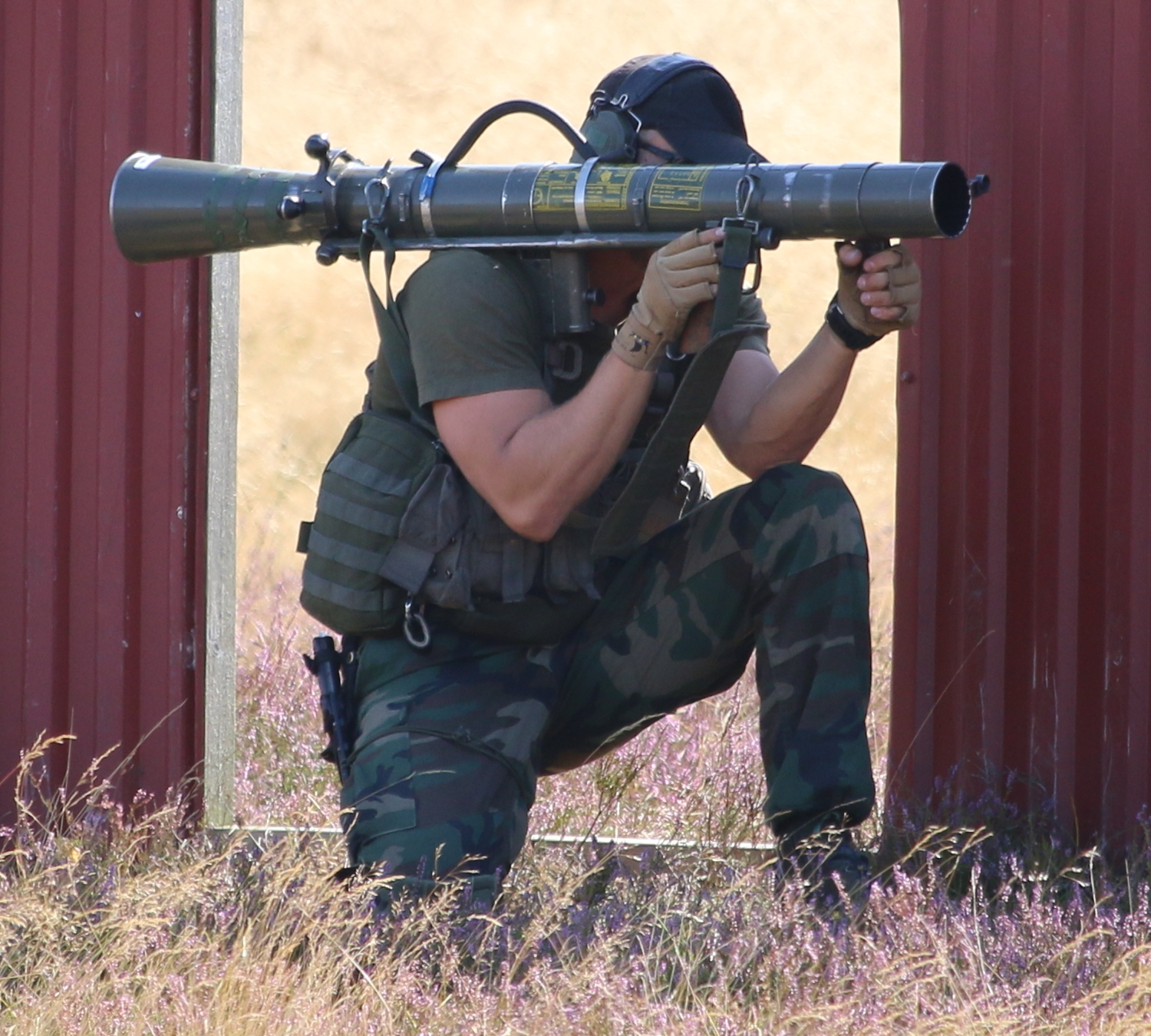
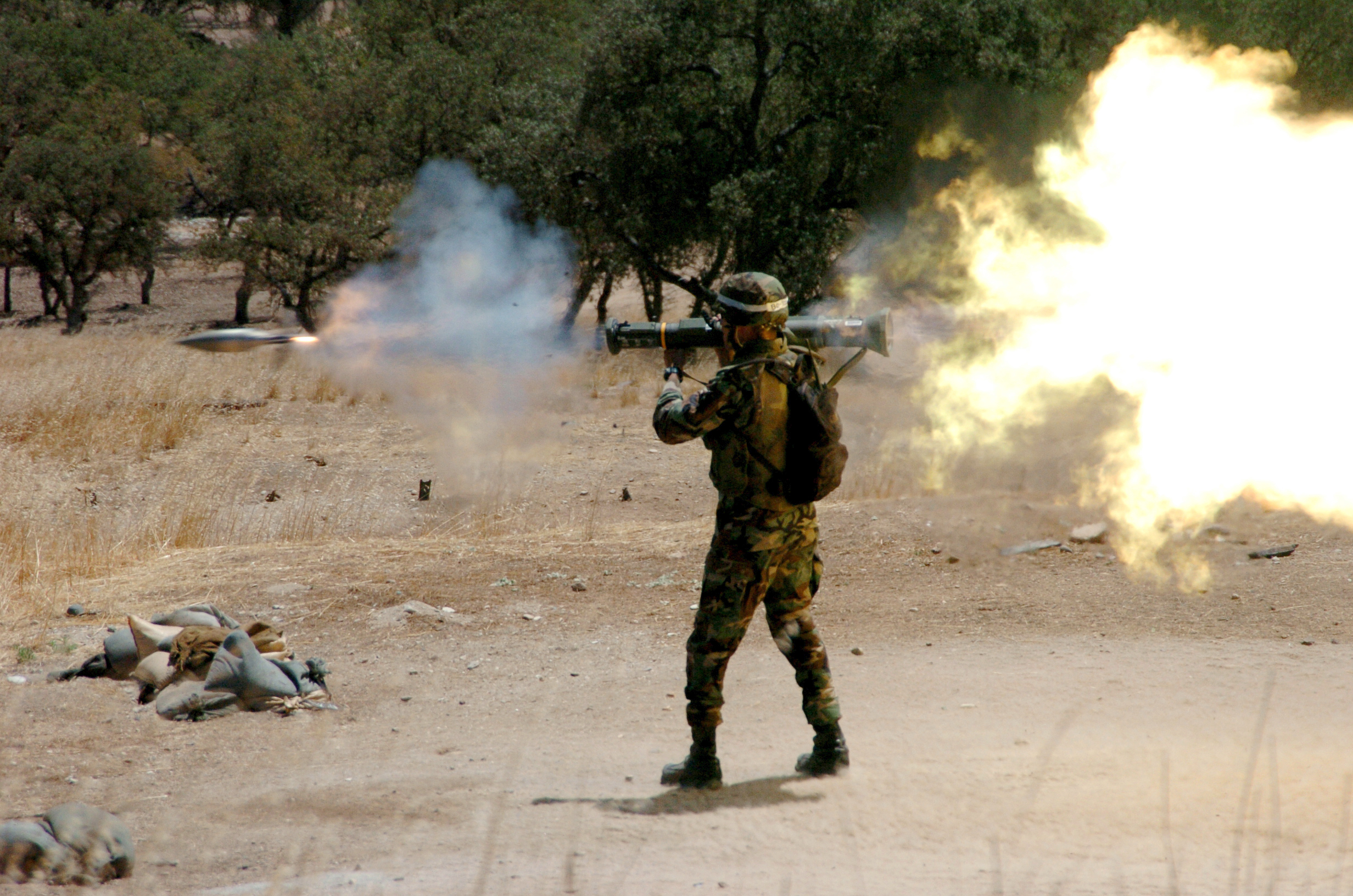
- Top left: Shoulder-fired reloadable rocket launcher: RPG-7
- Top right: Shoulder-fired single-use disposable surface-to-air missile launcher: FIM-43 Redeye
- Lower left: Shoulder-fired reloadable recoilless rifle: Carl Gustaf 8.4 cm recoilless rifle
- Lower right: Shoulder-fired single-use disposable light antitank weapon: AT4

Shoulder-fired missile, shoulder-launched missile, man-portable missile, man-portable missile launcher, man-portable rocket launcher or rocket launcher, among other variants, are common slang terms to describe high-caliber shoulder-mounted weapons systems; that is, weapons firing large, heavy projectiles ("missiles"), typically using the backblast principle, which are small enough to be carried by a single person and fired while held on one's shoulder. The word "missile" in this context is used in its original broad sense of a heavy projectile, and encompasses all shells and rockets, guided or unguided (compare with guided missile). A more formal variant is simply shoulder-fired weapons system and the like.

Shoulder-launched weapons may be guided or unguided, and the systems can either be disposable, such as the Panzerfaust 1, M72 LAW, AT4, etc., or reusable, such as the Panzerfaust 2, Carl Gustaf 8.4 cm recoilless rifle, RPG-7, etc. Some systems are classified as semi-disposable, such as the Panzerfaust 3.

== Slang nicknames ==
In many instances, the name bazooka is regularly used as an informal name for shoulder mounted "tube-like" launchers, stemming from the actual historical shoulder-fired missile-systems named such, the famous M1 Bazooka and M20 Super Bazooka man-portable rocket launchers of World War II.

The name rocket-propelled grenade (RPG) is regularly used as an informal name for man-portable unguided rocket-launcher systems, a backronym from the Russian acronym РПГ (Ручной Противотанковый Гранатомёт, Ruchnoy Protivotankovy Granatomyot), meaning "handheld anti-tank grenade launcher", the Russian term for infantry-carried anti-tank weapons, not only encompassing rocket-systems (see the RPG-2 for example).

== Description ==
=== Types ===
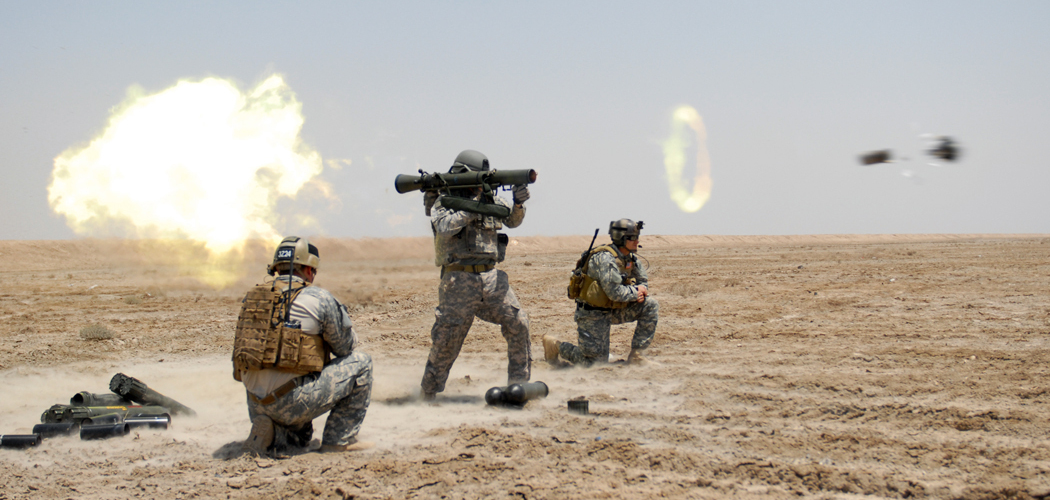
Shoulder-launched weapons avoid the problem of recoil by directing all exhaust out of the rear of the launch tube, the so-called backblast principle.

There are many types of shoulder-launched missile-weapons. Some systems are reloadable or semi-reusable, while others are single-use disposable systems, much in the same manner as a hand grenade. Ammunition traditionally use the backblast principle for propulsion, meaning that when fired, the propellant gases are expelled out of the back of the weapon to alleviate the reactional force exerted from the projectile moving forward.

If the weapon fires ammunition using fixed propellant charges, such as through cartridge cases on reloadable systems or a fixed container on singe-use systems, it is generally called a man-portable or shoulder-launched/fired recoilless rifle or recoilless gun, depending on if it uses a rifled or smoothbore barrel, essentially open-breech cannons. Smoothbore systems generally fire fin-stabilised munitions.

If the weapon fires rocket-propelled or rocket-assisted projectiles (booster launched), it is generally called a man-portable or shoulder-launched/fired rocket launcher or missile-system, depending on whether the ammunition is unguided or guided. Such systems typically use a small recoilless charge (a so-called booster charge) or compressed gas system to get the projectile out of the barrel and to a distance where the operator will not be hurt by the rocket's backblast; when the rocket ignites at a safe distance, it further accelerates the projectile or at least keeps it from decelerating in its trajectory.

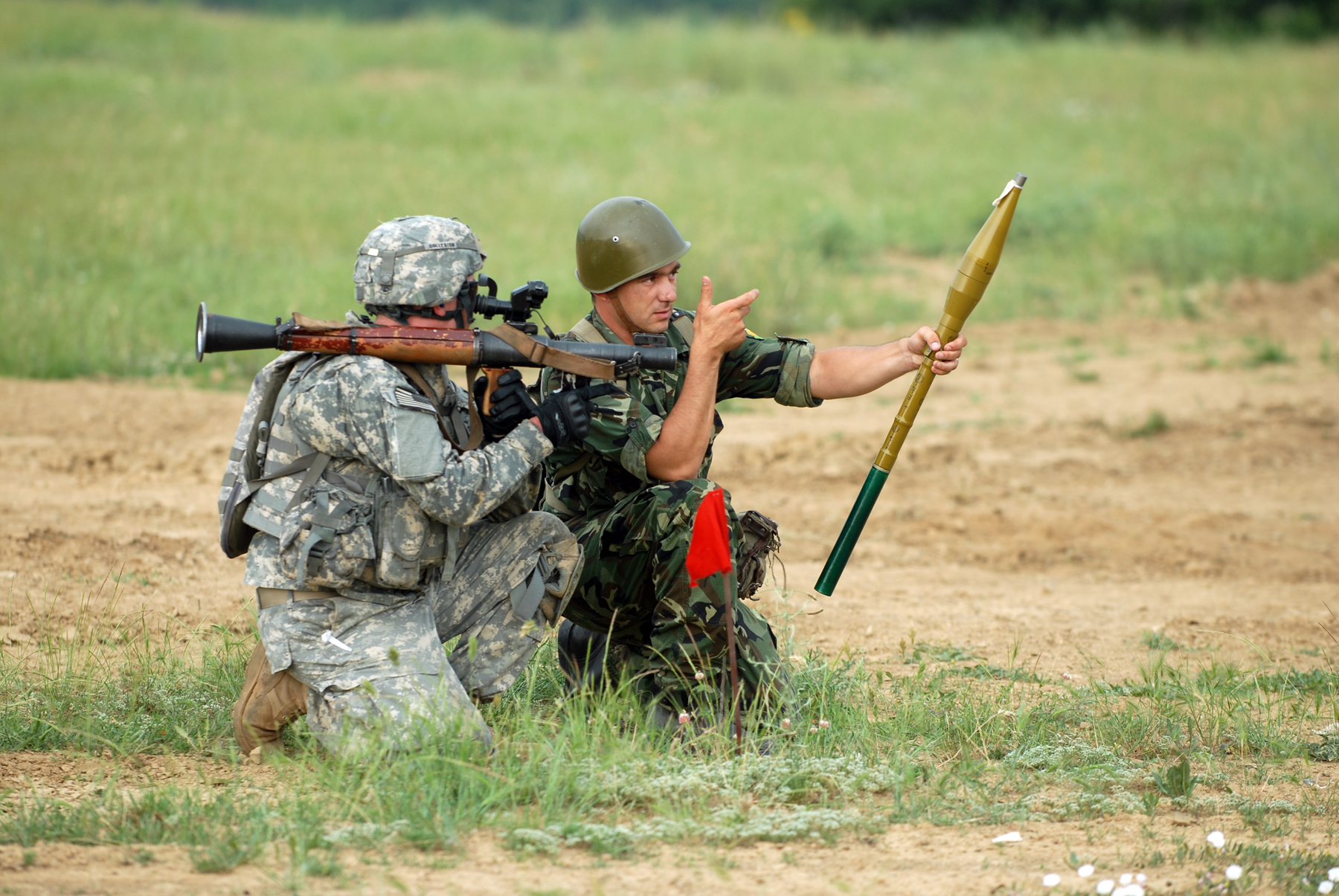
An American-Bulgarian team prepares to reload an RPG-7 shoulder-fired rocket launcher with a fresh rocket and booster charge.

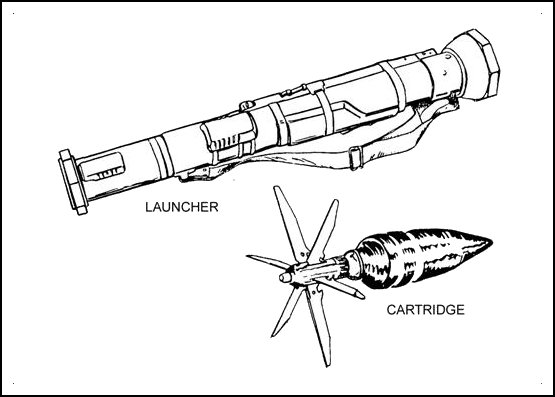
AT4 single-use disposable antitank launcher, a smoothbore recoilless gun pre-loaded with a HEAT-FS projectile and a fixed propellant casing.

US-Army demonstration film about the M202 FLASH single-use disposable rocket flamethrower.

Demonstration of the Russian RPO-M/PDM-A "Shmel-M" single-use disposable thermobaric rocket flamethrower. The "Shmel-M" is also known as RPO PDM-A.

=== Roles ===
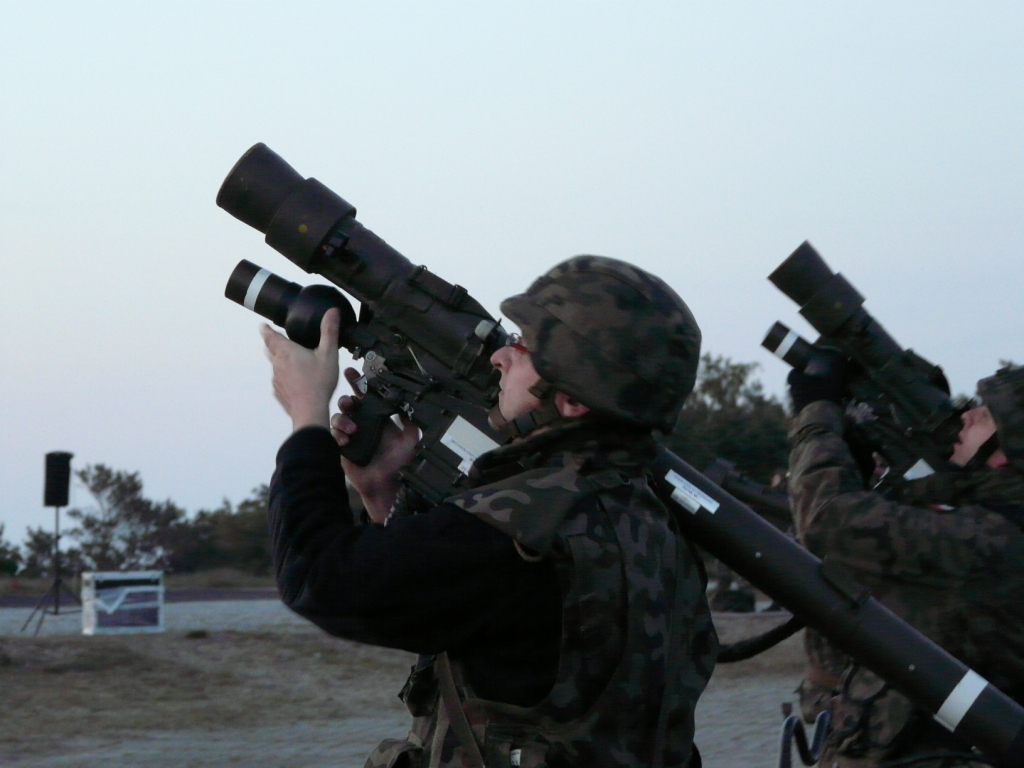
Polish soldiers prepare to fire PZR Grom MANPADS.

Shoulder-launched weapons typically fire at one of two main target types—ground targets or air targets. Weapons for use against ground targets come in a wide variety of types and sizes, with smaller, unguided weapons generally used for close range combat and larger, guided systems for longer ranges. Most of these weapons are designed mainly for anti-tank warfare, as anti-tank guided missiles (ATGMs) and carry one or two (a tandem-charge) high-explosive anti-tank (HEAT) shaped charge warheads. However, they are also effective against structures, and many such weapons have been designed specifically for such targets.

Anti-aircraft weapons, known as man-portable air-defense systems (MANPADS), are small surface-to-air missiles. They usually have infrared homing and are used against helicopters, unmanned aerial vehicles (UAVs) and other low-flying fixed-wing aircraft.

== History ==
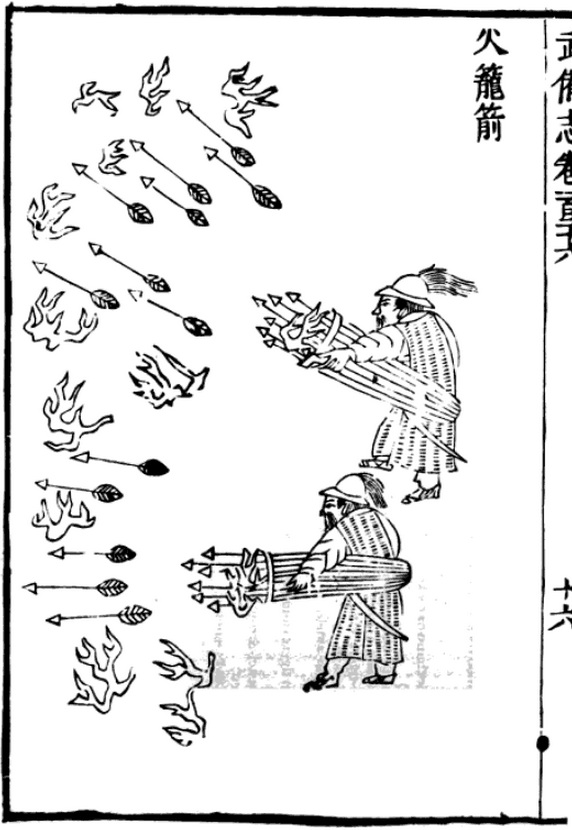
An illustration of a fire arrow rocket launcher as depicted in the 11th century book Wujing Zongyao. The launcher is constructed using basketry

Rocket-based weapons have a long history, from the black powder fire arrows used by the ancient Chinese to the Congreve rocket referenced in "The Star-Spangled Banner," the national anthem of the United States. They have always been prized for the portability of their launch systems.

The earliest rocket launchers documented in imperial China launched fire arrows with launchers constructed of wood, basketry, and bamboo tubes. The rocket launchers divided the fire arrows with frames meant to keep the arrows separated, and were capable of firing multiple arrow rockets at once. Textual evidence and illustrations of various early rocket launchers are found in the 11th-century Southern Song dynasty text Wujing Zongyao. The Wujing Zongyao describes a portable rocket arrow carrier consisting of a sling and a bamboo tube.

Shoulder-launched rockets have a launch tube. In order to prevent the user from being burned by the exhaust, the rocket (or at least its first stage) must burn out before it leaves the tube, and if present the second stage must fire once the rocket is well clear of the launcher. Even if the operator is safe, there is a sizeable blast effect to the rear.

Also, the rocket must have a reliable ignition system. In modern systems, this is almost always a percussion cap. This system was not fully developed until the German Panzerfaust of World War II, an early one-shot design that also was the first practical recoilless antitank gun and thus used no rocket. The bazooka was an early rocket-propelled development which could be reloaded.

=== Usage ===
From their first conception during the First World War, many portable missiles have been used to give infantry a weapon effective against armored vehicles and fortified structures. The power of the shaped charge meant that the effectiveness of the weapon was not limited by a gun barrel bore nor size of weapon as for example a conventional armor-piercing shell from an artillery piece. As such these man-portable weapons could be used to equip infantry units with their own anti-tank and anti-aircraft weapons.

Shoulder-launched rockets or recoilless guns are a favored anti-technical weapon. They permit otherwise lightly or poorly armed troops (e.g. militias) to destroy modern sophisticated equipment such as close air-support aircraft, helicopters, and lightly armored vehicles.

Attacks come from ambush for the element of surprise and attempt to immobilize a convoy of vehicles, then destroy its defenders, then destroy its contents, then escape before air or artillery support can arrive.

Normally, the militia will plan to have two to four shooters per attacked vehicle. Reliable attack ranges are 50 to 100 m, although attacks can succeed out to 300 m. Self-destruct ranges of common rocket weapons such as RPG-7s are about 900 m.

The usual response to such attacks is to suppress the shooters, with saturation anti-personnel fire, artillery or aerial barrages in area-denial attacks. Submunition and thermobaric weapons are often used to clear landing zones (LZ) for helicopters.

In modern counter-insurgency operations in misty, dusty or night-time situations, advanced optics such as infrared telescopes permit helicopter gunships to observe convoys from beyond human-visible range and still attack insurgents with inexpensive anti-personnel fire. This approach is more economical than area-denial. Protecting as little as 20% of the convoys rapidly depletes an area of active insurgents.

== Some examples of shoulder-launched missiles ==
Weapons below are listed in alphabetical order:

=== Anti-tank ===
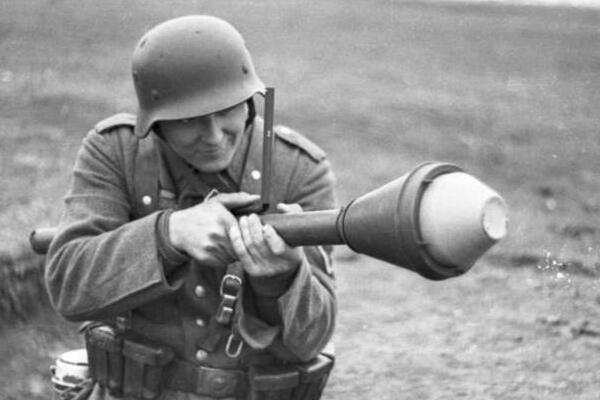
A German soldier using a Panzerfaust, a single-use light antitank weapon, traditionally fired "under-arm" instead of shoulder-fired like modern systems, Ukraine, 1944.

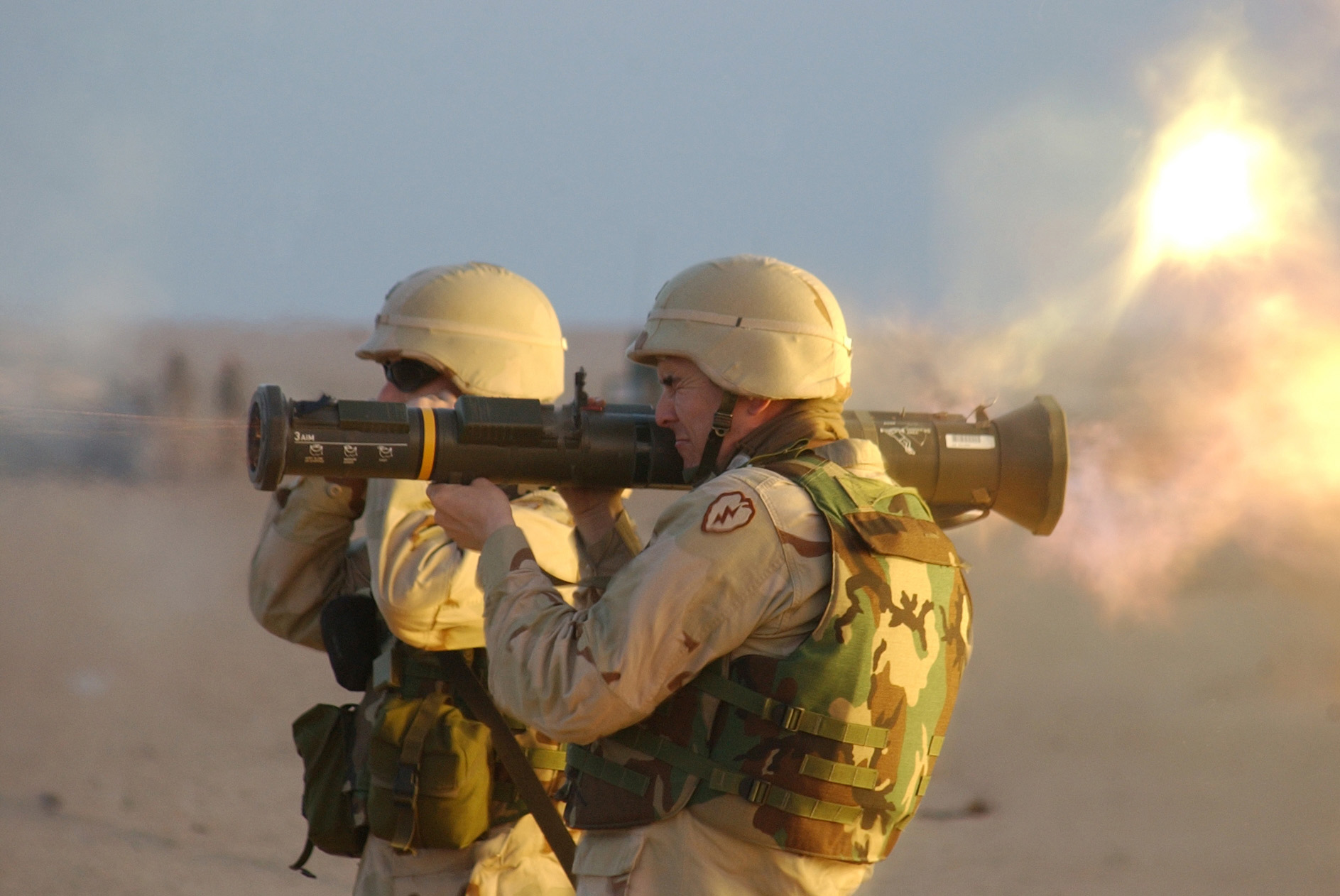
US-soldiers firing a Swedish AT4 single-use disposable light antitank weapon during familiarization training at the Udari range in Kuwait, 2004.

- (Spain) 1990 – C90-CR (M3)
- (Spain) 1998 – Alcotán-100
- (Sweden) 1987 – AT4
- (Sweden) 1942 – Carl Gustaf 20 mm recoilless rifle
- (China) 2008 – DZJ-08
- (Nazi Germany) 1942 – Faustpatrone
- (United States) 1996 – FGM-148 Javelin
- (United States) 2002 – FGM-172 SRAW
- (United Kingdom) 1987 – LAW 80
- (France) 1950 – LRAC 73-50
- (France) 1972 – LRAC F1
- (United States) 1942 – M1 Bazooka
- (United States) 1944 – M20 Super Bazooka
- (United States) 1975 – M47 Dragon
- (United States) 1963 – M72 LAW
- (Sweden) 1968 – Miniman
- (United States) 1984 – Mk 153 Shoulder-Launched Multipurpose Assault Weapon (SMAW)
- (Sweden) 2009 – NLAW
- (Nazi Germany) 1944 – Panzerfaust 1
- (West Germany) 1963 – Panzerfaust 2
- (West Germany) 1987 – Panzerfaust 3
- (Nazi Germany) 1943 – Panzerschreck
- (China) 1993 – PF-89
- (China) 1998 – PF-98 Anti-Tank Rocket Launcher "Queen Bee"
- (United Kingdom) 1943 – PIAT Anti-Tank Grenade Projector
- (United States) 2017 – PSRL-1 – A modification of the RPG-7 series
- (Sweden) 1949 – Raketgevär
- (Soviet Union) 1954 – RPG-2
- (Soviet Union) 1961 – RPG-7
- (Soviet Union) 1972 – RPG-18
- (Soviet Union) 1985 – RPG-22
- (Soviet Union) 1985 – RPG-26
- (Soviet Union) 1989 – RPG-27
- (Russia) 2011 – RPG-28
- (Soviet Union) 1989 – RPG-29
- (Russia) 2012 – RPG-32 Barkas
- (Poland) 1985 – RPG-76 Komar
- (France) 1987 – Wasp 58 Light Anti-Armour Weapon

=== Anti-aircraft ===
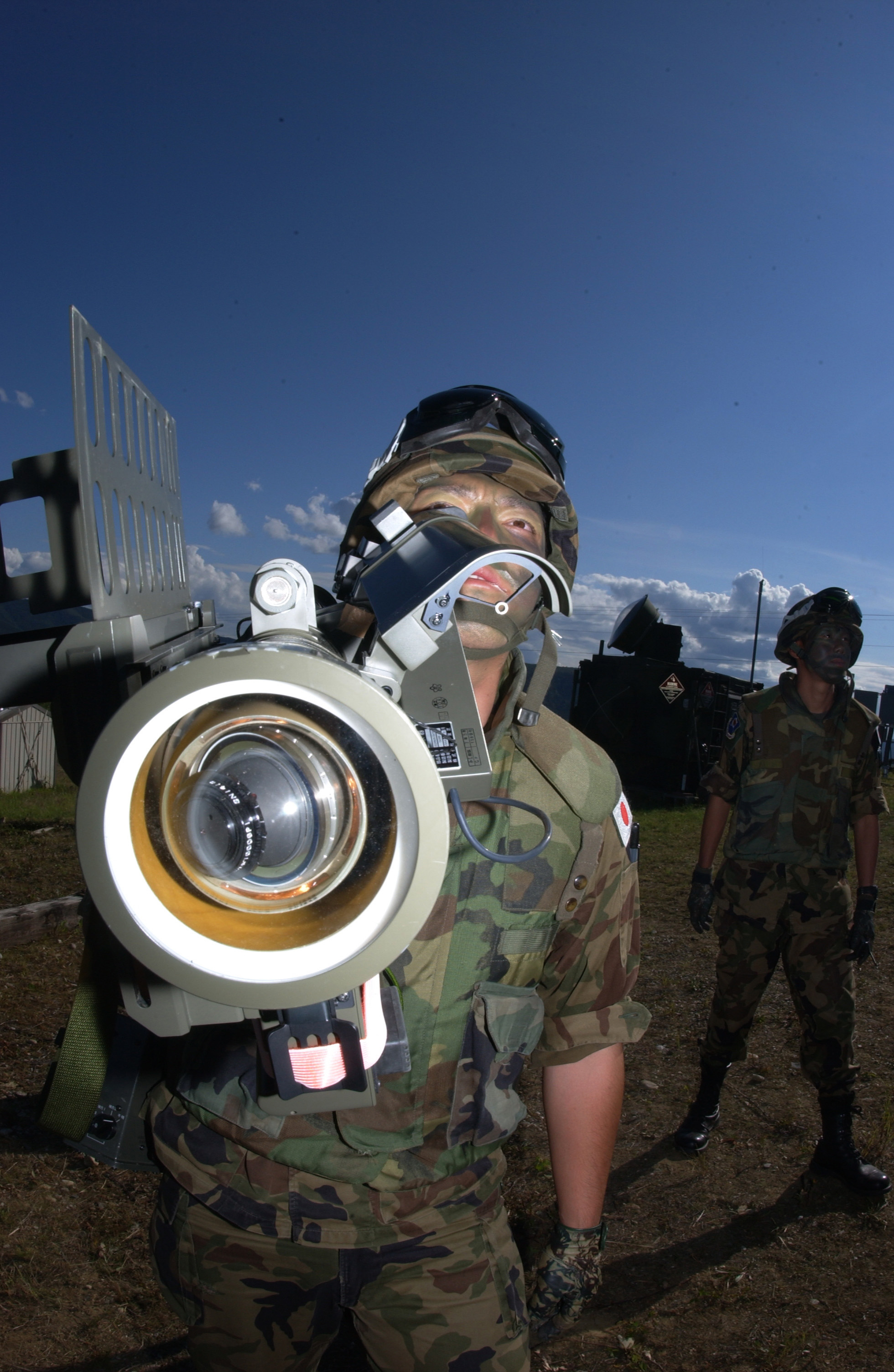
A JASDF soldier handles a Type 91 Kai MANPADS during exercises as a part of Red Flag – Alaska.

- (Soviet Union) 1970 – 9K32 Strela-2
- (Soviet Union) 1974 – 9K34 Strela-3
- (Soviet Union) 1981 – 9K38 Igla
- (Russia) 2014 – 9K333 Verba
- (Pakistan) 1989 – Anza
- (United Kingdom) 1975 – Blowpipe
- (United States) 1967 – FIM-43 Redeye
- (United States) 1981 – FIM-92 Stinger
- (Nazi Germany) 1945 – Fliegerfaust
- (China) 1990s – FN-6
- (China) 1970s – HN-5
- (Poland) 1995 – PZR Grom
- (China) 1998 – QW-2
- (Japan) 1994 – Type 91 surface-to-air missile

=== Fire support/multi-purpose ===
- (Sweden) 1943 – Carl Gustaf 37 mm recoilless rifle
- (Sweden) 1945 – Carl Gustaf 47 mm recoilless rifle
- (Sweden) 1948 – Carl Gustaf 8.4 cm recoilless rifle M1
- (Sweden) 1964 – Carl Gustaf 8.4 cm recoilless rifle M2
- (Sweden) 1986 – Carl Gustaf 8.4 cm recoilless rifle M3
- (Sweden) 2014 – Carl Gustaf 8.4 cm recoilless rifle M4

=== Flamethrowers ===
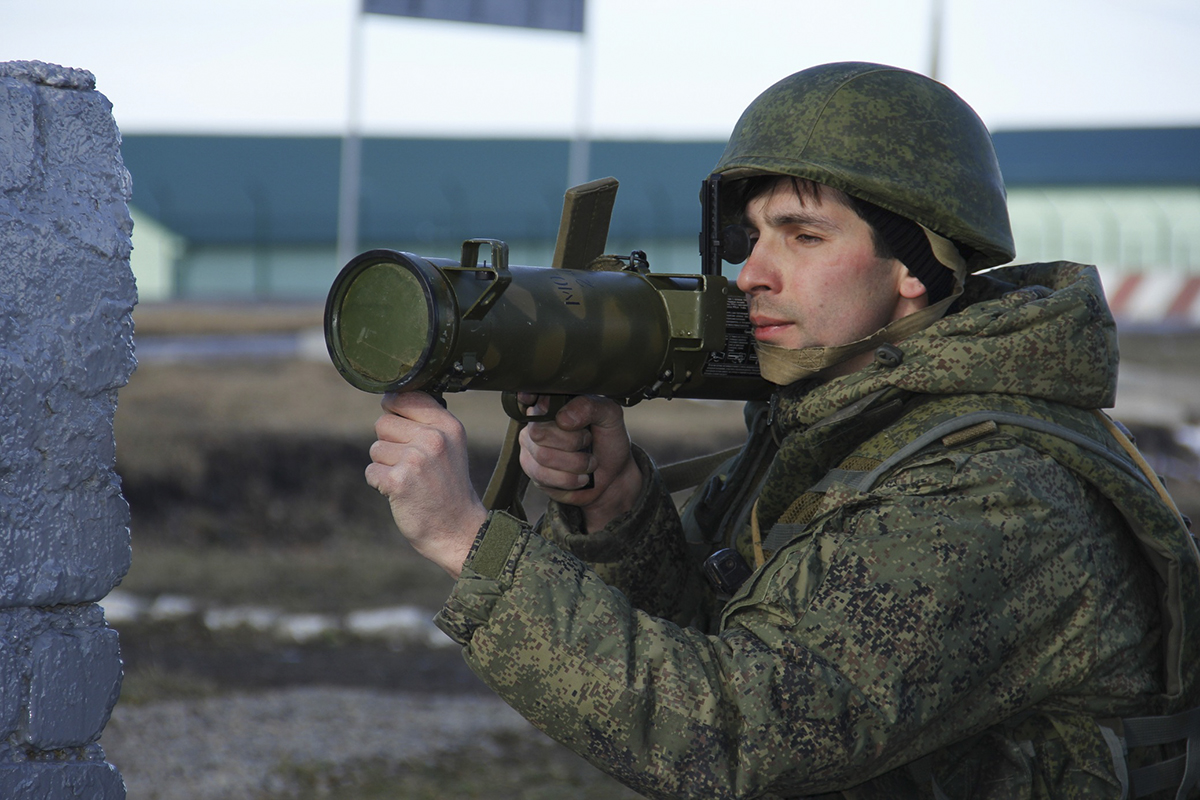
Russian soldier with a single-use disposable RPO-A Shmel rocket flamethrower.

- (United States) 1978 – M202 FLASH
- (Soviet Union) 1975 – RPO Rys
- (Soviet Union) 1986 – RPO-A Shmel
- (Russia) 2004 – RPO-M/PDM-A "Shmel-M"

== See also ==
- Anti-tank guided missile (ATGM)
- Surface-to-air missile (SAM)
- Man-portable air-defense system
- List of MANPATS (man-portable anti-tank systems)
- List of missiles
- List of rocket launchers
