= FGR-17 Viper =

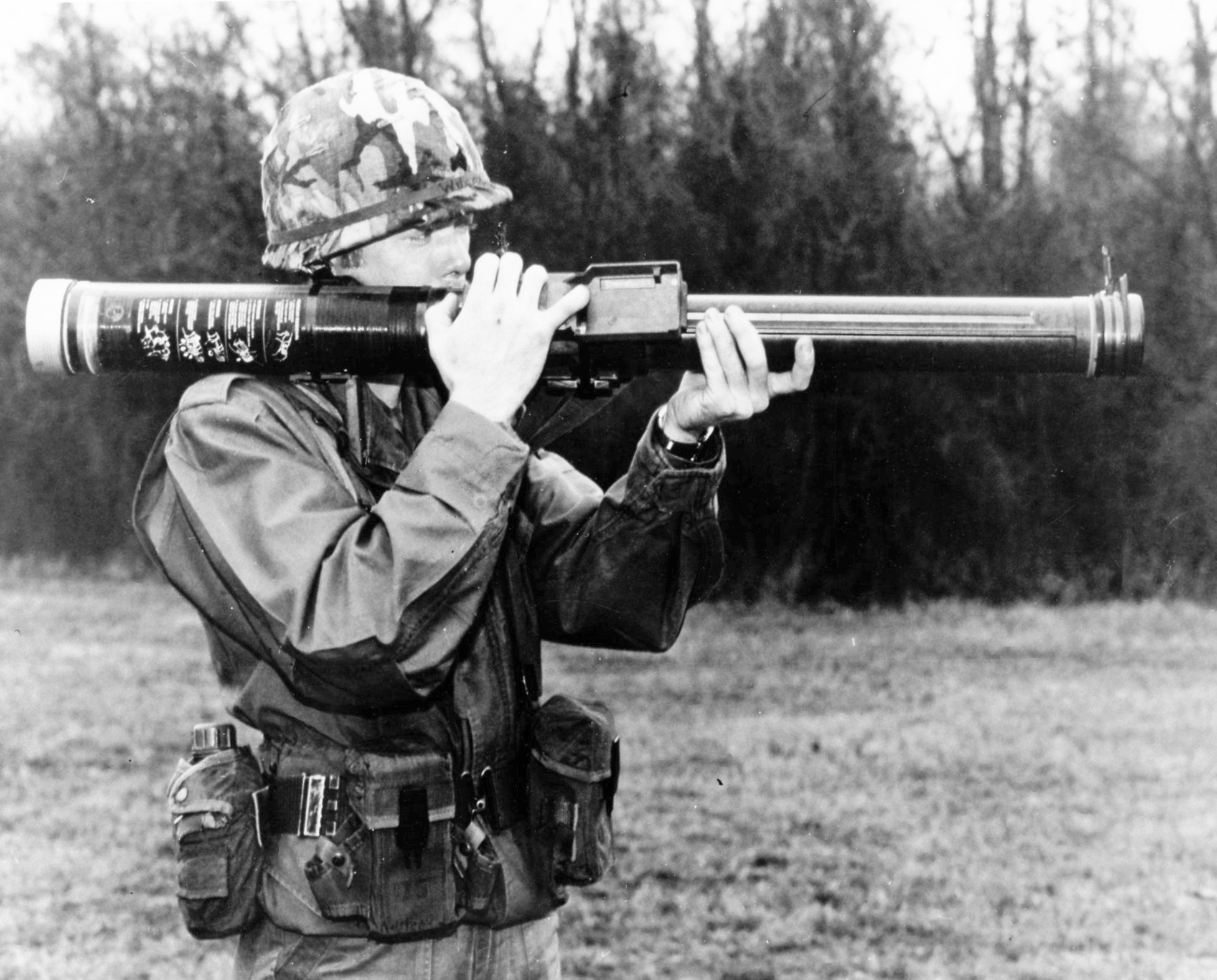
- The FGR-17 VIPER in extended position
- Type: Anti-tank/unguided rocket
- Place of origin: United States

Service history
- In service: 1983 (canceled same year)
- Used by: United States
- Wars: Cold War

Production history
- Designed: Late 1970s
- Manufacturer: General Dynamics, Pomona Division
- Unit cost: US$1,310.00 FY 1982–83
- Produced: 1982

Specifications
- Mass: 4 kg
- Length: 111.7 cm ready to fire
- Caliber: 70 mm
- Muzzle velocity: 257 m/s
- Effective firing range: 250 m moving – 500 m stationary
- Sights: pop up M16 type iron sights

The FGR-17 Viper was an American one-man disposable shoulder-fired antitank rocket, which was slated in the 1980s to be the replacement for the M72 LAW. It was canceled shortly after production began due to cost overruns and concerns about safety and capability. (Note: Shortly after the Viper was canceled, the U.S. Army dropped the term LAW (light antitank weapon) and replaced it with LAAW (light anti-armor weapon) and LMPW (light multi-purpose weapon).)

== Program history ==
=== Start of the program ===
In 1972, the Viper program began as a study to replace the M72 LAW. In 1975, a program designated ILAW (Improved Light Antitank Weapon) issued a request for proposals to the defense industry. In 1976, after studying the industry proposals, the U.S. Army designated General Dynamics as the prime contractor, changing the ILAW program name to "Viper."

The main requirements for the ILAW/Viper program was a disposable weapon in the same weight and size category as the M72 LAW, with major improvements in accuracy, safety, and penetration, and without a major increase in cost per round over the M72 LAW, which it was to replace.

=== Poor requirements statement ===
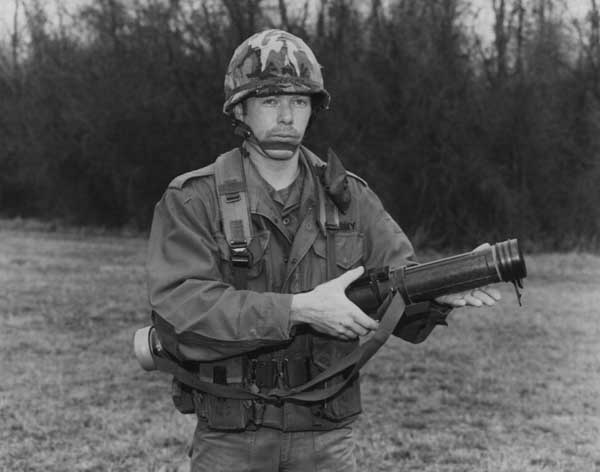
A Viper launcher shown collapsed for carrying

When the ILAW requirement was first issued, the Army wanted an individual antitank weapon with such a low cost that it would be as common in infantry units as the hand grenade. All these requirements, which included items contradictory to each other, proved to be too great a hurdle for General Dynamics. This resulted in subsequent issues that led to highly publicized congressional inquires into a classified GAO report which stated that the Viper "barely meets the low end of the Army's requirement" and concluded that "Viper did not demonstrate any significant superiority over the M72 LAW."

=== Over-optimistic statements by the prime contractor ===
Journalists soon discovered that when the prime contractor was named in 1976 for the Viper program, General Dynamics had told the Army that when mass production for the Viper was reached, the cost of Viper would only be $78.00 per round before inflation. Despite the negative publicity, the Army decided to continue the Viper program and make improvements. In December 1981, General Dynamics was awarded a $14.4 million contract to start production for 1,400 Viper rounds.

=== Safety issues ===
Shortly after this contract was issued, there were also reports of safety problems with the first production lot during field evaluation tests by the U.S. Army. Test firings had shown Viper rounds to have a safety problem with its fuze system, that caused the warhead to explode shortly after launch. One report detailed an accident at Fort Benning, Georgia where a helicopter pallet of Viper rounds was found to be damaged by static electricity.

=== Scandal and congressional intervention ===
In February 1982, in a move that took even the strongest supporters of the Army by surprise, the Army issued a second contract worth $83.7 million for 60,000 more Viper rounds. In December 1982, following the anger caused by the signing of this second contract and because of the earlier GAO report on the Viper, the massive cost overruns, and the safety concerns revealed in the Army's evaluations, Senator Warren Rudman (R-NH) inserted an amendment into the Army's funding bill. This amendment deleted 69% of the Viper funding and mandated testing of available light antitank weapons which were already in production, including foreign manufacturers' models, with a report due back to Congress in 1983.

=== End of the program ===
External images
- VIPER brochure 1981
- Front-Back
- Section 1
- Section 2
- Section 3

About this time, General Dynamics made the decision not to compete in the tests mandated by Congress, because of the Army's demand for a fixed price contract on any future Viper production lots that were to include safety improvements. This meant that after the Army had spent over $250 million on a M72 LAW replacement since 1975, the Viper program was at an end.

In September 1983, with General Dynamics's decision to refuse a fixed price contract request, the Army canceled all contracts for the FGR-17 Viper. Two months later, the testing mandated by Congress found that the Swedish designed AT4 was the most suitable off-the-shelf option to replace the M72 LAW. The AT4 did not meet every requirement, but it was the only one to meet most of the requirements. Congress agreed, and funded the AT4 as the future M72 LAW replacement. The US Marine Corps, who had also intended to purchase Viper, instead adopted a modified version of the Israeli B-300 rocket launcher, the Mk 153 SMAW.

== Description ==
According to General Dynamics' brochure, the FGR-17 was intended to be used by front-line troops as opposed to dedicated anti-tank squads, to give these units a last line of defense backed up by the heavier and more specialized TOW, Dragon and Hellfire missile launchers. These launchers, as opposed to the FGR-17, are far more effective against tanks and can strike from longer distances, but require a specialized anti-tank unit, whereas the FGR-17 could be deployed to all soldiers in large quantities. General Dynamics specifically stated that the FGR-17 was best deployed in close quarters against enemy flanks and rears, not against front armor.

The launcher of the FGR-17 is made from lightweight fibreglass, and resembles many features of its predecessor. It has a telescopic tube, much like the M72 LAW it was meant to replace, and the trigger and firing mechanism does not protrude from the launcher itself, with the trigger placed flush against the tube to allow the weapon to be stowed in a backpack more easily. Unlike the M72 LAW, the tube does not extend back, but forwards from the firing mechanism.

Covers at the rear and front of the tube protect the missile from environmental effects such as moisture and dust. Only the rear cover needs to be removed before firing. The FGR-17 uses flip-down aperture sights for targeting, protected by a casing. As the missile tube is extended, the sights are released and flip up.

The missile has a solid rocket-powered booster and a HEAT warhead. Nine collapsible fins extend in mid-flight to ensure a stable flight path. The missile fires via an impact fuse. After firing, the launcher has to be discarded, it can not be re-used with another missile. The FGR-17 launcher acts as a container for the missile. Both are meant to be handled as a single unit. The FGR-17, like all weapons of its kind, produces a backblast effect, so care for collateral damage must be taken whilst firing.

== See also ==
- List of rocket launchers
- List of anti-tank missiles
- C90-CR (M3)
- MARA (anti-tank weapon)
