= LRAC =

LRAC may refer to:

- Long run average cost
- LRAC 89 and LRAC 73, French shoulder-fired rocket launchers
- Laurentian–Radziwiłł–Academic Chronicle, see Suzdalian Chronicle
