= UAW (disambiguation) =

The United Auto Workers, or UAW, is an American trade union.

UAW may also refer to:

== Organizations ==
- United Associations of Women, a 20th-century Australian feminist group founded by Linda Littlejohn, Adela Pankhurst, and Jessie Street, amongst others
- United Automobile, Rubber and Allied Workers of South Africa, a trade union
- Union of American Women, a women's association in the Americas founded in 1934
- Union of Australian Women, a women's organization

== Other uses ==
- Unadjusted actor weight
- Under accumulator of wealth, a term used in the book The Millionaire Next Door
- Universe at War: Earth Assault, a real-time strategy video game by Petroglyph Games
- Urban Assault Weapon, a weapons program
