= Beyond-armour effect =

Term denoting the post-penetration effect of a projectile

Beyond-armour effect is a term coined by Försvarets Fabriksverk (FFV), a semi-governmental Swedish defense firm, while developing the AT4 anti-tank weapon. From the 1980s, this phrase was used in its brochures, press releases, weapon instruction manuals and other documentation to denote the post-penetration effect of all anti-armor rounds and devices.

The phrase now has become more or less standard in modern military terminology.

== History ==
During World War II, man-portable antitank weapons using shaped charge warheads, more commonly known today as HEAT projectiles, came into widespread use with almost all armies. These warheads have the advantage of not being affected by the projectile's velocity. They penetrate armour by the detonation of an explosive charge fitted in a liner in the shape of a cone or, more precisely, an ogive. The liner is often made of a soft metal, such as copper. Detonation of this shaped charge turns it into a highly focused stream moving forward at extreme speeds. Like medium and high velocity solid shot armour piercing projectiles, these warheads also cause spalling on the interior of the vehicle's armour plate.

A problem with shaped charge warheads is that if the ogive shaped liner is deep, the warhead will have more penetration but will form a smaller hole; smaller holes are associated with less damage inside the armoured vehicle than larger ones. Research on shaped charge warheads has shown a hole that is the size of a large coin on the outside of a tank turret will have the diameter of a pencil lead on the turret's inner face. If, on the other hand, the ogive is shallow, it will have less penetration, but cause a larger hole on the inside which will result in a massive spalling.

In 1954, during the siege of Dien Bien Phu, France had dismantled and flown in a number of M24 Chaffee light tanks. Their thickest armor was only 25.4 mm. The Viet Minh's main infantry antitank weapon was the older World War Two U.S. 2.36-inch bazooka, captured from Nationalist Chinese forces and supplied by Communist China. During the siege the French launched counterattacks using the M24 in support of their infantry. One Chaffee took seven hits from 2.36-inch bazookas and still continued to fight, demonstrating that portable rocket launchers were hardly a flawless tank-killer.

Other examples became evident during the Vietnam War. The North Vietnamese and their allied forces in South Vietnam were equipped with two types of light anti-armour weapons. One was the 1950s era B-40, which was a Chinese manufactured version of the Russian RPG-2, and the other was the newer RPG-7. The RPG-2 had a shallow cone and the RPG-7 a deep cone. The B-40 had a maximum penetration against armour of approximately 150 mm while the RPG-7 penetration was more than double that of the B-40. But to the surprise of the North Vietnamese, the B-40, while not effective against heavy tanks, was far more effective than the RPG-7 in killing or wounding the occupants of light armoured vehicles, and in igniting the ammunition storage or the vehicle's fuel, including the more modern M113 APC which U.S. and South Vietnamese forces at that time operated in large numbers. In addition, the B-40 proved more effective than the RPG-7 against non-armoured targets, like the bunkers at fire base camps. There are many stories from U.S. Vietnam veterans of the enemy attacking or ambushing very effectively with the B-40. The U.S. Army also discovered that in combat, with rare exceptions, more than one hit by the M72 LAW rocket was required to disable or kill the North Vietnamese PT-76 light tank.

== Development ==
The combat record of light anti-armour weapons was studied by the engineers at FFV working on a replacement for the Pansarskott m/68 in the late 1970s. The result was the AT4 with a HEAT warhead that had, as the early AT4 brochures stated, a "special beyond-armour effect". The designers of the AT4's warhead intended that one hit would cause massive damage to both the occupants and the interior of the targeted vehicle. FFV has said very little about the design of the AT4's warhead, being willing only to describe its effects. Defense journalists and military experts have speculated on the warhead's design. A cutaway photo of the AT4's projectile gave clues. Instead of the standard cone shape liner used by other HEAT warheads, the AT4 has a unique trumpet-shaped liner. Trumpet-shaped liners are believed to be more effective in resisting the counter-blast of reactive armour tiles, that explode and disrupt the HEAT warhead's particle stream. There has been speculation that the liner in the AT4's HEAT warhead is constructed of a special aluminum alloy. Others have stated it is primarily a copper liner with a secondary liner of aluminum bonded to the back of the copper liner. Another clue to the effectiveness of the AT4 is the presence of a "focus ring" to concentrate the blast. All public statements to 1984 on the subject are speculative. Tests conducted by the U.S. Army on the AT4 confirmed that the claims made by FFV regarding the AT4's devastating post-penetration effect were substantially correct.

External images
- Test Photos of AT4's Beyond-armour effect
- AT4 launcher and HEAT projectile
- Cutaway of complete AT HEAT warhead - ie note unique trumpet shape of liner and focus ring in front of liner
- Rear view of obsolete APC hit by AT4 HEAT projectile showing beyond-armour effect
- Top view of obsolete APC hit by AT4 HEAT projectile showing beyond-armour effect

== Description ==
As described by FFV in their first AT4 brochure in 1983, the beyond-armour effect had five distinctive characteristics upon penetration of an armoured vehicle:

- A massive overpressure inside the vehicle of approximately 11 bar over normal.
- Secondary fragments from the warhead itself due to the large entry hole, plus more extensive spalling than caused by HEAT warheads of similar diameter.
- An intense light that is 100 times brighter than sunlight.
- Generation of dense smoke in the armoured vehicle's interior.
- Generation of extensive heat inside the armoured vehicle.

FFV claims that besides the effect of the massive spalling and fragmentation on the occupants of the armoured vehicle, which is standard for all HEAT warheads to a degree, the massive overpressure and intense heat will ignite ammunition and more importantly the armoured vehicle's diesel fuel. The intense light effect will blind any occupants for at least seven minutes, adding to the obscuring effect of the dense smoke created by the AT4's HEAT warhead.
