= Backblast =

Backblast may refer to:

== Fictional characters ==
- Backblast (G.I. Joe), a fictional character in the G.I. Joe universe
- Backblast, member of the Deep Space Team of Mini-Cons in the Transformers universe

== Other uses ==
- Backblast area, the area behind a rocket launcher which needs to be clear of personnel
