= Urban assault vehicle =

Urban assault vehicle or Urban Assault Vehicle may refer to:

- EM-50 Urban Assault Vehicle, a fictional armored personnel carrier from 1981 American war comedy film Stripes
- Any fictional combat vehicle from 1998 computer game Urban Assault
- "Rollin' (Urban Assault Vehicle)", a version of Limp Bizkit song "Rollin'"

== See also ==
- Urban Assault Weapon
