= Assault weapon (disambiguation) =

== Politics ==
- Assault weapon, a term used in American firearm legislation to define smallarms regulated or banned for their possession of certain features or presence on a list of named weapons.
- Assault weapons legislation in the United States, at federal, state, and local levels.

== Weapon systems ==
- FGM-172 SRAW (Short-Range Assault Weapon)
- Heckler & Koch HK CAWS (Close Assault Weapon System)
- Rifleman's Assault Weapon
- Shoulder-launched Multipurpose Assault Weapon
- Urban Assault Weapon
