= AT4 =

Swedish anti-tank weapon

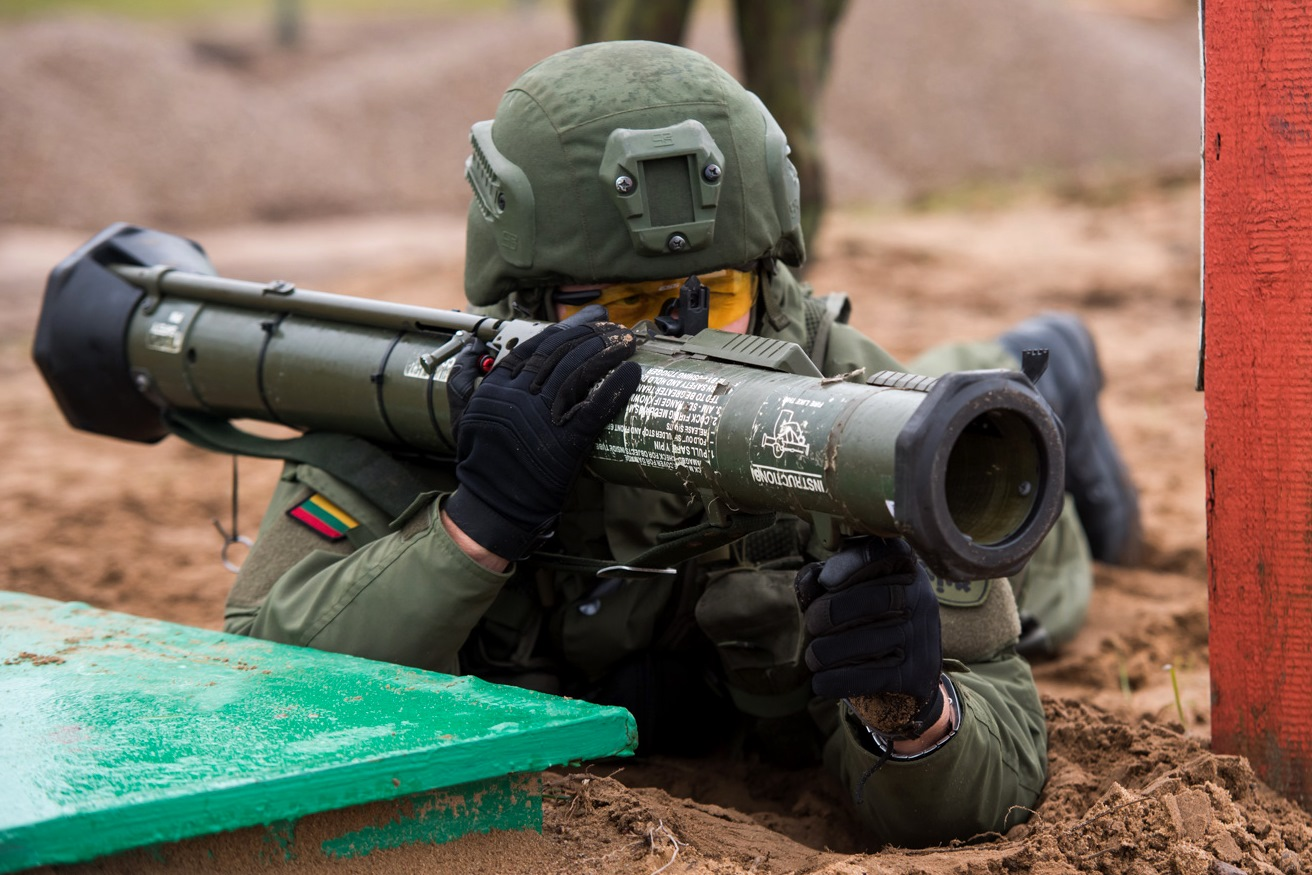
- Type: Disposable anti-tank launcher
- Place of origin: Sweden; United States

Service history
- In service: 1987–present
- Used by: See Operators
- Wars: See Wars

Production history
- Designer: Förenade Fabriksverken
- Manufacturer: Saab Bofors Dynamics (Swedish version); Alliant Techsystems (U.S. version)
- Unit cost: US$1,480 (In 1999) US$2,857 (2025)
- No. built: 600,000+
- Variants: See Variants

Specifications
- Mass: 6.7 kg (14.8 lb) (AT4); 8 kg (18 lb) (AT4-CS)
- Length: 102 cm (40 in)
- Caliber: 84 mm
- Muzzle velocity: 290 m/s (950 ft/s; 1,000 km/h), 220 m/s (720 ft/s; 790 km/h) (CS)
- Effective firing range: 300 m (point target)
- Maximum firing range: 500 m (area target); 2,100 m (maximum)
- Sights: Iron sights, optional AN/PVS-4 night vision unit
- Filling: Octol
- Filling weight: 440 g high-explosive anti-tank (HEAT) round

External images
- Prototype AT4 Sweden tested 1981/82
- Early AT4 with Swedish Soldier
- Early AT4 launcher and projectile

The AT4 (Note: Sometimes also spelled AT-4 or AT 4.) is a Swedish 84 mm (3.31 in) unguided, man-portable, disposable, shoulder-fired recoilless anti-tank weapon manufactured by Saab Bofors Dynamics. The AT4 is not a rocket launcher strictly speaking, because the explosive warhead is not propelled by a rocket motor. Rather, it is a smooth-bore recoilless gun (as opposed to a recoilless rifle, which has a rifled barrel). Saab has had considerable sales success with the AT4, making it one of the most common light anti-tank weapons in the world. The M136 AT4 and M136A1 AT4CS-RS are the variants used by the United States Army.

The AT4 is intended to give infantry units a means to destroy or disable armoured fighting vehicles and fortifications. The projectile is preloaded into the launcher at the factory and issued as one unit of ammunition, with the launcher discarded after one firing.

== Etymology ==
The name AT4 is a word play on the 84 mm caliber of the weapon, (84) 'eighty four' being a homophone of 'A-T-4'. The name also doubles as an alpha-phonetic word play on the weapon's role, due to "AT" being a common military abbreviation for "anti-tank". The name was created for export purposes as the nickname "eighty-four" was already a common English nickname for the Carl Gustaf 8.4 cm recoilless rifle after its caliber.

== Development ==
The AT4 is a development of the 74-mm Pansarskott m/68 (Note: Pansarskott is a Swedish term that roughly translates to "armour shot".) (Miniman) adopted by the Swedish Army in the late 1960s. Like the m/68, the AT4 was designed by Försvarets Fabriksverk (FFV) and manufactured at their facility at Zakrisdal, Karlstad, Sweden. FFV began research on a replacement for the m/68 in 1976, deliberately designing an individual anti-armour weapon that would not be able to defeat the heavy armour protection of MBTs (main battle tanks) in frontal engagements, believing that to be counterproductive. The AT4 was designed as a weapon to engage medium-to-light armoured vehicles from any direction or MBTs from the sides or rear, and as an assault weapon effective against buildings and fortifications. FFV's prime design goal was a weapon that was simple to use, rugged, and far more accurate against moving targets than previous individual antiarmour weapons. Another key requirement was that the AT4 not only be able to penetrate armour, but also exhibit devastating beyond-armour effect after penetration. FFV and the Swedish Army began the first evaluation firings of the prototype AT4s in the spring of 1981, with 100 tested by early 1982.

Even before the AT4 had been adopted by Sweden, it was entered into a United States Army competition for a new anti-tank weapon mandated by Congress in 1982 when the FGR-17 Viper failed as a replacement for the M72 LAW. Six weapons were tested in 1983 by the US Army: the British LAW 80, the German Armbrust, the French APILAS, the Norwegian M72E4 (an upgraded M72 LAW), the US Viper (for baseline comparison purposes) and the Swedish AT4. The US Army reported to Congress in November 1983 that the FFV AT4 came the closest to meeting all the major requirements established to replace the M72 LAW, (Note: The French APILAS was the only tested weapon that had the maximum penetration to defeat the frontal armour of the new Russian T-72 MBT, but it was rejected due to its weight and size.) with the Armbrust coming in second. (Note: The Armbrust, while an impressive weapon with its almost total lack of launch signature, which enabled it to be fired from enclosed spaces, was rejected due to higher cost and lack of effective range against moving targets.)

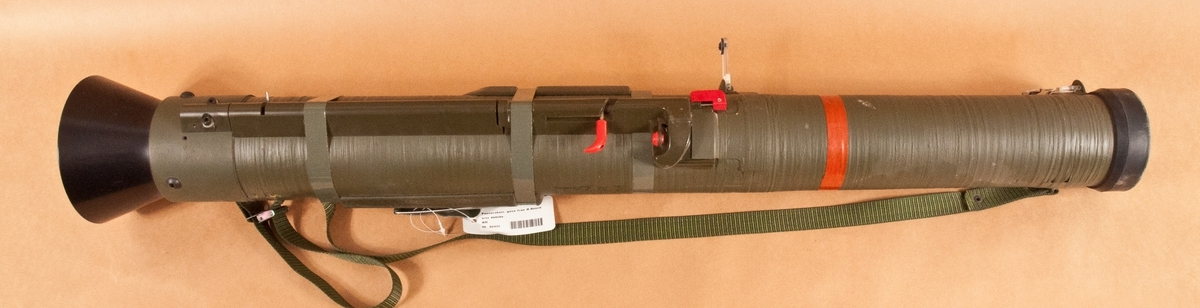
Early AT4 prototype without modifications made by the US Army

Though very impressed with the simplicity and durability of the tested version of the AT4, the US Army saw some room for improvement, specifically the addition of rear and front bumpers on the launch tube and changes to the sights and slings. After these changes, the AT4 was adopted by the US Army as the Lightweight Multipurpose Weapon M136. (Note: The U.S. Army had so much grief in the early 1980s from various committee members of the U.S. Congress over the M72 LAW being officially referred to in manuals as a Light Antitank Weapon that they named the AT4 to make sure no member of Congress could question that again.) The Swedish Army also recognized these improvements and subsequently adopted the Americanized version of the AT4 as the Pansarskott m/86 (Pskott m/86), with the addition of a forward folding hand grip to help steady the AT4 when being aimed and fired. The forward folding grip is the only difference between the AT4 adopted by Sweden and the US Army version.

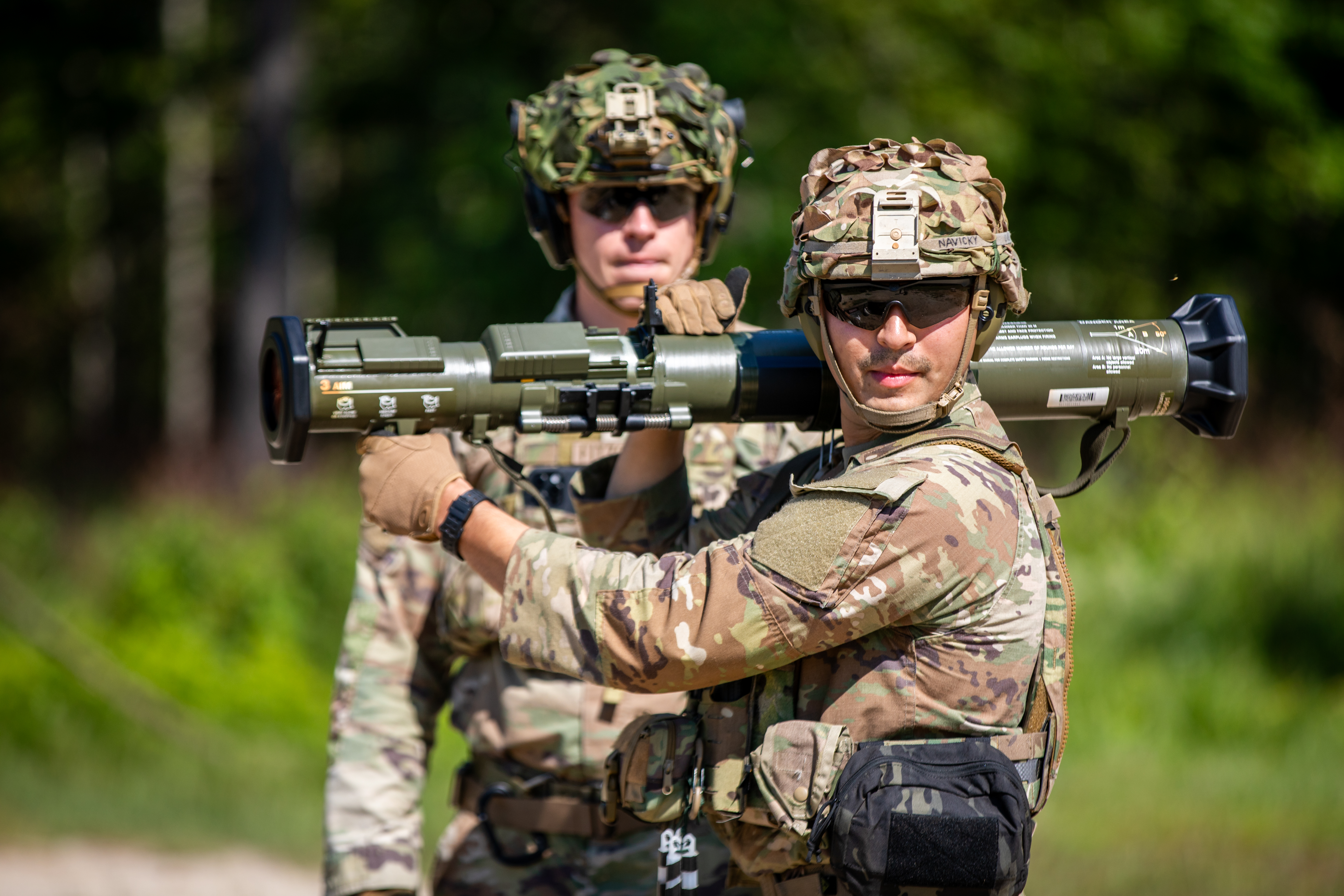
M136A1 AT4CS-RS

Due to the urban combat conditions that US military forces faced regularly during the Iraq War, the US Army Close Combat Systems manager in charge of purchases of the AT4 suspended orders for the standard version of the AT4; US military forces instead only ordered the AT4 CS (Confined Space) version.

== Operation ==
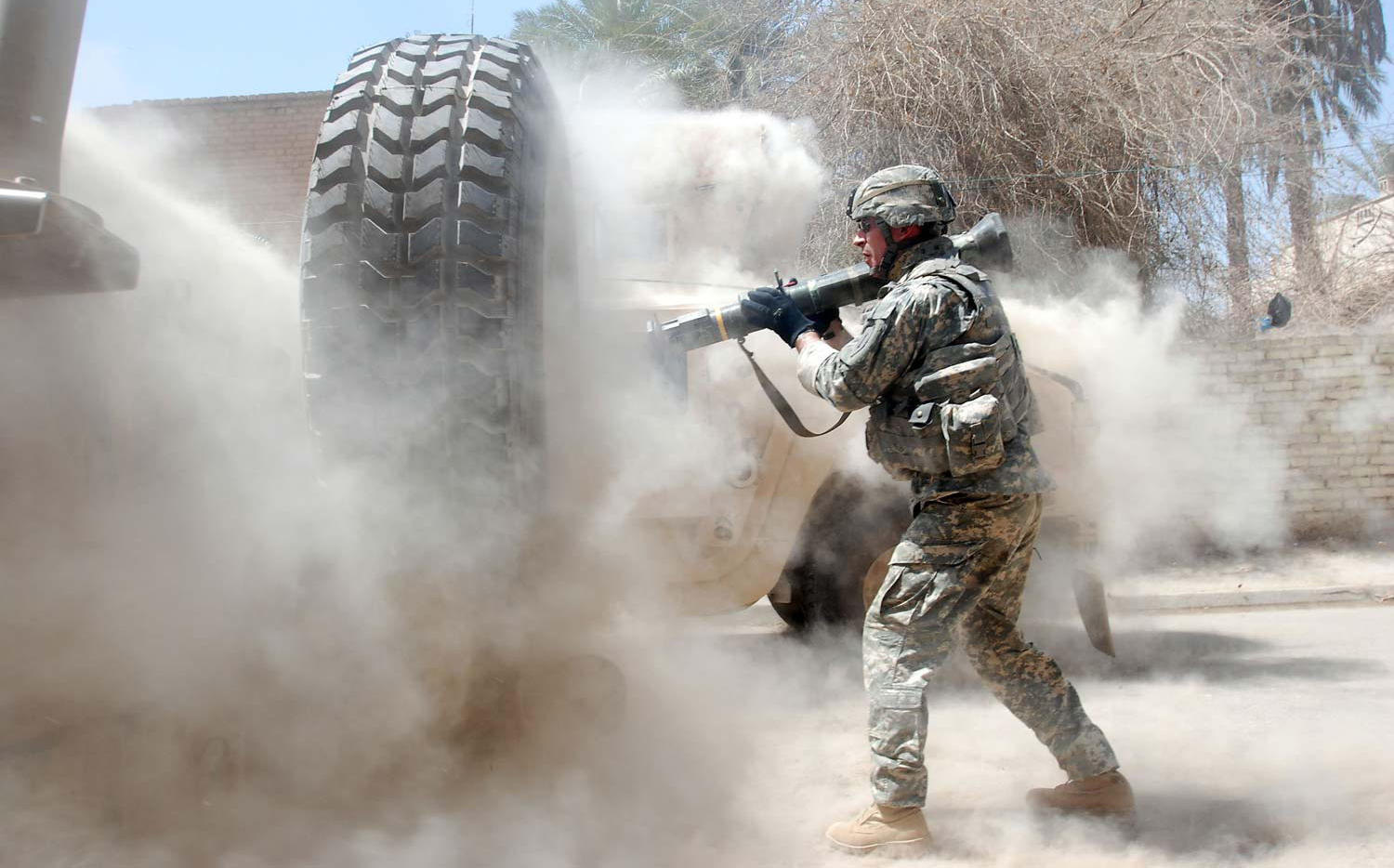
Seconds after firing an AT4 in combat in Iraq

The AT4 may be considered a disposable, lower-cost alternative to a Carl Gustaf 8.4 cm recoilless rifle. The AT4 took many of its design features from the Carl Gustaf, which operates on the principle of a recoilless weapon, where the forward inertia of the projectile is balanced by the inertia of propellant gases ejecting from the rear of the barrel. But unlike the Carl Gustaf, which uses a heavier and more expensive steel tube with rifling, (Note: Until the 1980s the Carl Gustaf was constructed of high-alloy steel, but later versions used a thin steel liner containing the rifling, strengthened by a carbon fibre outer sleeve.) the disposable AT4 design greatly reduces manufacturing costs by using a reinforced smoothbore fiberglass outer tube. Being a disposable gun also allows for lighter and cheaper construction. In a single-use disposable gun, the barrel only needs to be able to contain a single pressure spike when firing, when it can be disposed of, even if it is ruined, burnt-out and strained, unlike traditional guns which are required to survive many pressure spikes without failure and thus need to be strongly overbuilt and made of heat-proof materials. Pressures are also kept quite low compared to many traditional guns. The AT4's thin, lightweight barrel, low operating pressure, and significant recoil mitigation, means that relatively large projectiles (comparable to those found in mortars and artillery systems) can be utilised, which would otherwise be impossible in a man-portable weapon.

In the system originally developed by FFV for the Carl Gustaf, a plastic blowout plug is placed at the centre rear of the shell casing containing the projectile and propellant, which itself is enclosed in the AT4 outer tube. When the gases build up to the correct pressure level, the blowout plug disintegrates, allowing the proper amount of gases to be vented to the rear, balancing the propellant gases pushing the projectile forward.

The AT4 adopted a unique method developed earlier by FFV: the spring-loaded firing rod is located down the side of the outer tube, with the firing pin at the rear of the tube. When released, the firing pin strikes a primer located in the side of the casing's rim.

The disadvantage of the recoilless design is that it creates a large back blast area behind the weapon, which can cause severe burns and overpressure injuries to friendly personnel in the vicinity of the user and sometimes even to the users themselves, especially in confined spaces. The back blast may also reveal the user's position to the enemy. The problem of back blast was solved with the AT4-CS (Confined Space) version, specially designed for urban warfare. This version uses a saltwater countermass in the rear of the launcher to absorb the back blast; the resulting spray captures and dramatically slows down the pressure wave, allowing troops to fire from enclosed areas. The AT4-CS version also reduced its muzzle velocity from the original 290 m/s to 220 m/s as part of its effort to be user-safe in a confined space, making the AT4-CS version more difficult to use as the drop is more pronounced. The effectiveness of the HEAT warhead is not dependent on speed.

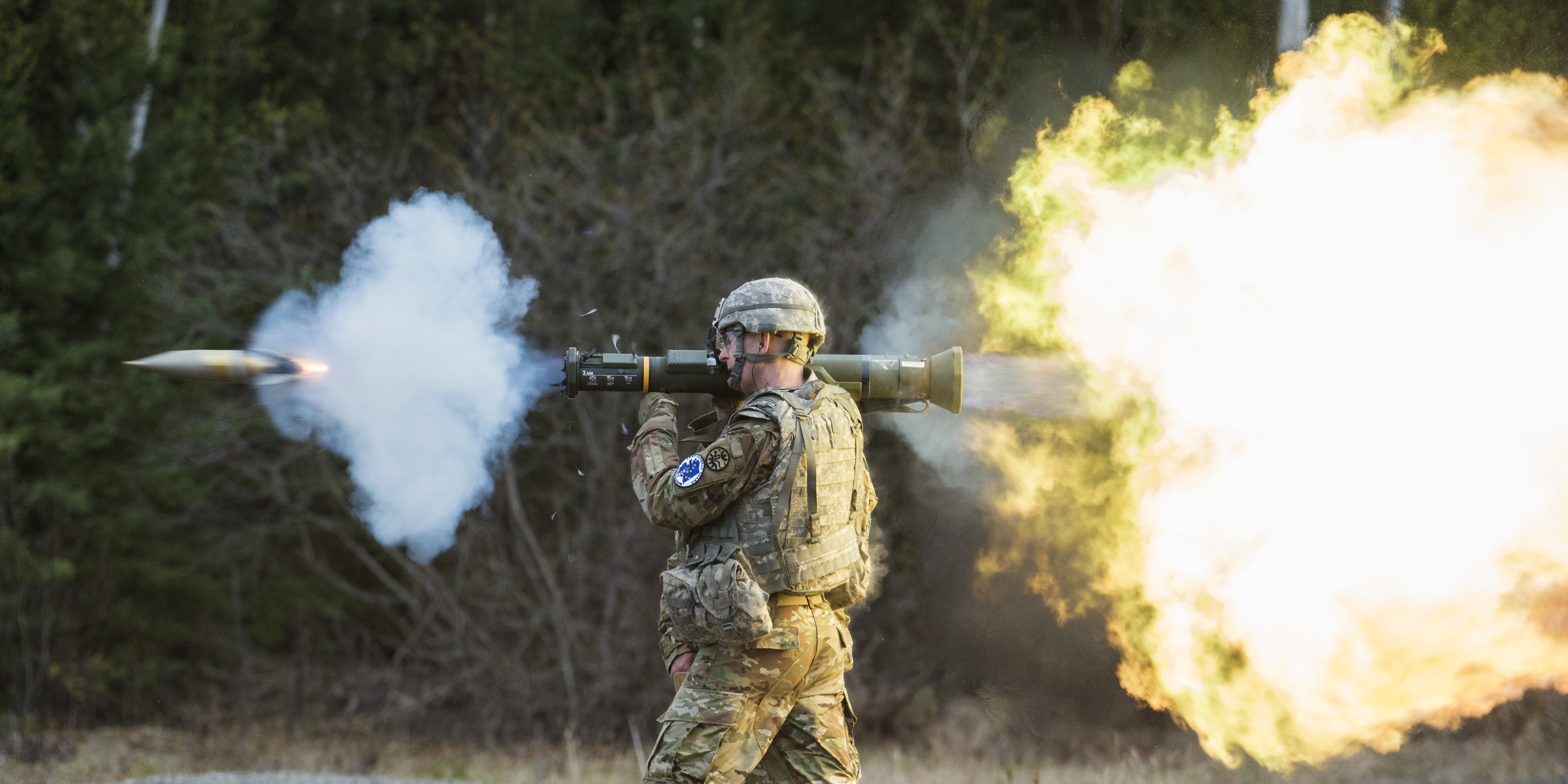
M136 AT4

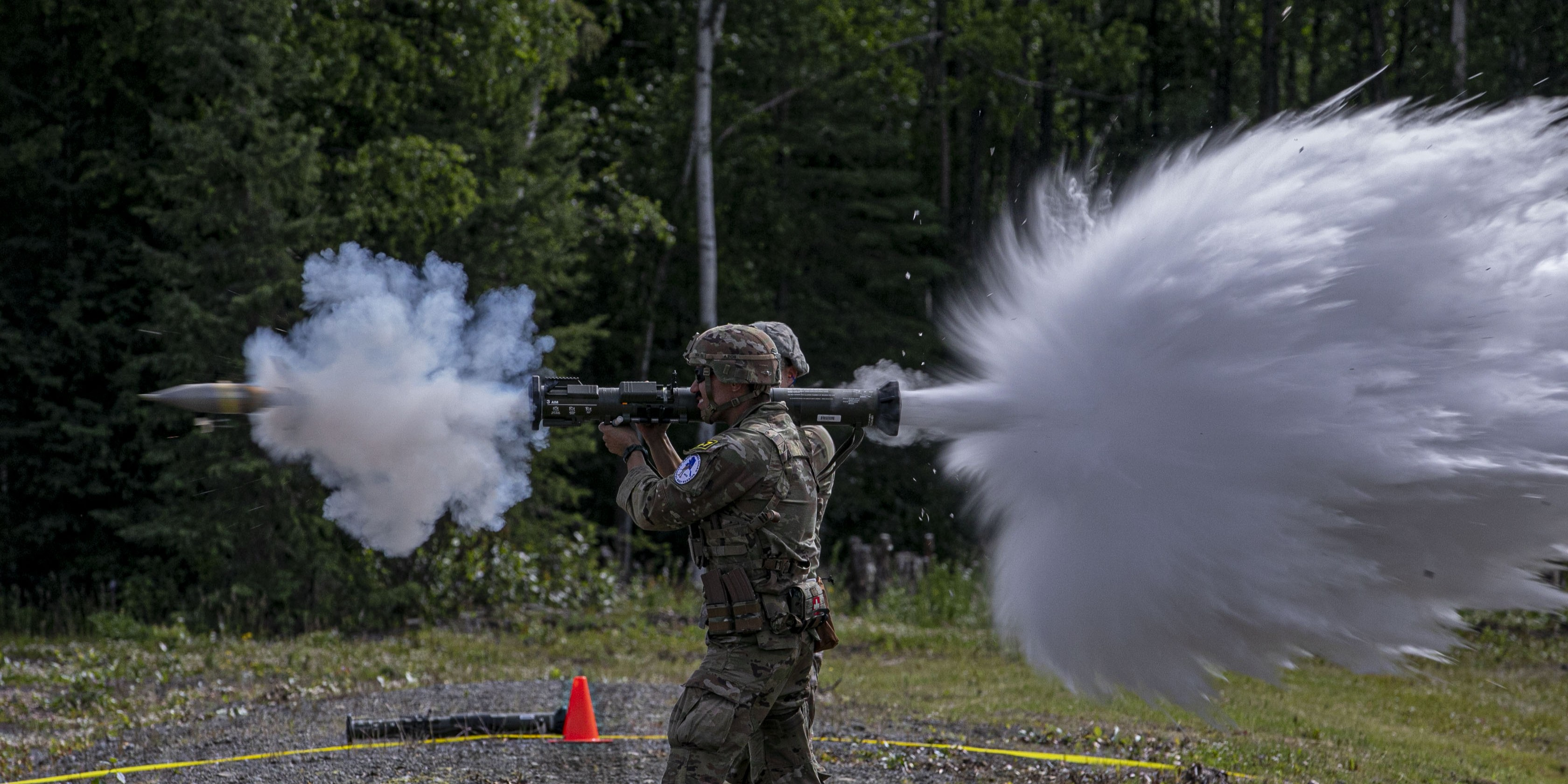
M136A1 AT4CS-RS

M136A1 AT4CS-RS firing

To fire, the gunner first removes the safety pin located at the rear of the tube, which unblocks the firing rod. They then take a firing position, ensuring that no one is present in the back blast area. If firing from the prone position, they must also place their legs well to the side to avoid burning themself. Then, the gunner moves back the front and rear sight covers, allowing the sights to pop up into their firing positions. The AT4 has iron sights that were originally developed for the cancelled Viper, and are similar in concept and use to those on assault rifles. (Note: FFV and the Swedish Army were so impressed by these sights that they adopted them for their AT4s; while adequate during the day, the original plastic sights were difficult to see at night or under low light conditions.) They then remove the first of two safeties by moving the firing rod cocking lever (located on the left side) forward and then over the top to the right side. The gunner takes aim, while at the same time holding down the red safety lever located in front of the cocking lever, and then fires by pressing forward the red firing button with his right thumb. Both the red safety lever and the firing button must be pressed down at the same time to fire the AT4. The red firing button has a similar resistance to the trigger pull of a rifle, so the gunner does not have to jab at the firing button, which could throw their aim off.

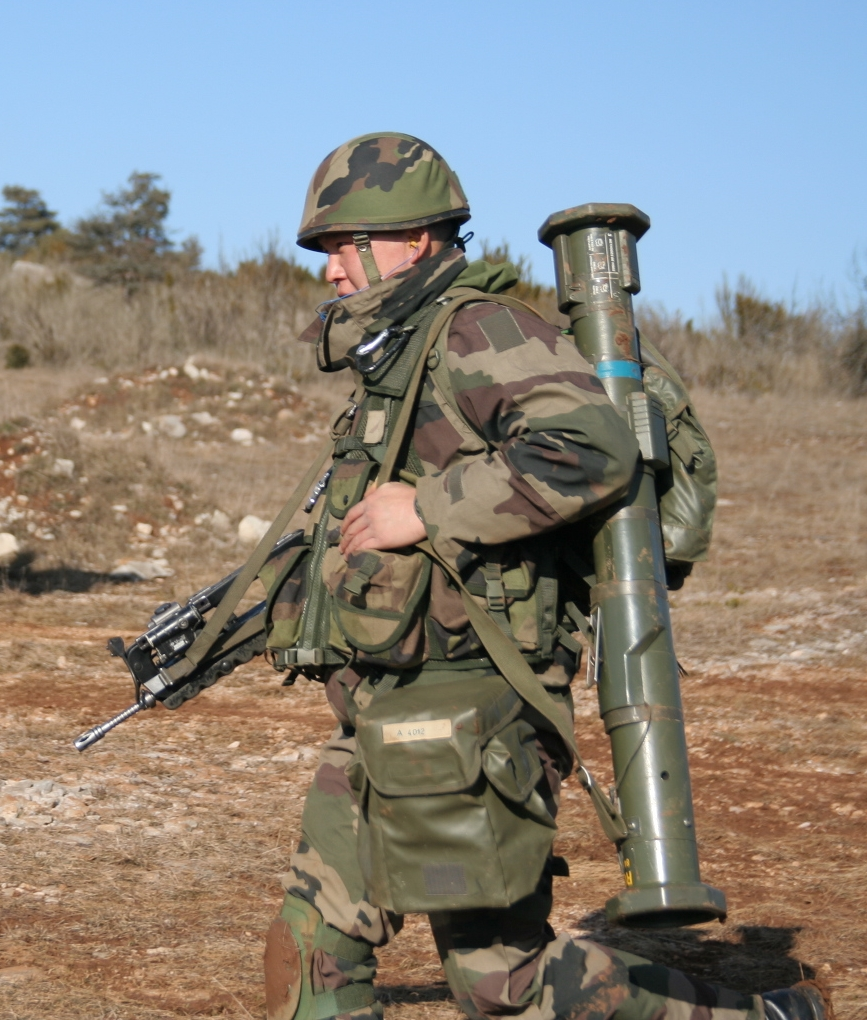
The AT4 is man-portable, as demonstrated by this French soldier carrying a FAMAS rifle and an AT4.

After firing, the AT4 launcher is discarded. Gunners are often trained to break off the sights after use, in order to prevent other soldiers from mistaking used launchers for unused ones. Unlike the heavier Carl Gustaf, the AT4 outer tube is built to take the stress of just one firing; it is not reusable and cannot be reloaded.

The AT4 can mount an optical night sight on a removable fixture. In US military use, the launcher can be fitted with the AN/PAQ-4C, AN/PEQ-2, or the AN/PAS-13 night sights.

The AT4 requires little training and is quite simple to use, making it suitable for general issue. However, as the cost of each launcher makes regular live-fire training very expensive, practice versions exist that are identical in operation but fire reloadable 9×19mm or 20mm tracer ammunition. Both practice cartridges are unique to their respective weapons, with their trajectory matched to that of the live round. The 20mm version also has a recoilless weapon effect with the same high noise and back blast as the AT4 firing and is favoured by the Swedish army because of the added realism of the back blast as compared to the "plonk" sound of the 9mm round (similar to the sound of a finger tapping on an empty can).

External images
- AT4 version adopted by US as M136
- AT4 launcher shown with ammunition and HEAT projectile
- AT4 cutaway illustration showing ammunition installed
- AT4 front sight extended
- AT4 rear sight extended
- AT4 cock safety, press finger safety, and thumb firing button

== Specifications ==
- Time of flight (to 250 metres (820 ft)): less than 1 second
- Operating temperature: −40–60 °C (−40–140 °F)
- Ammunition: fin-stabilized projectile with HEAT warhead

== Projectiles ==
There are several different projectiles for the AT4. Because it is a one-shot weapon, projectiles are preloaded into the launcher tubes.

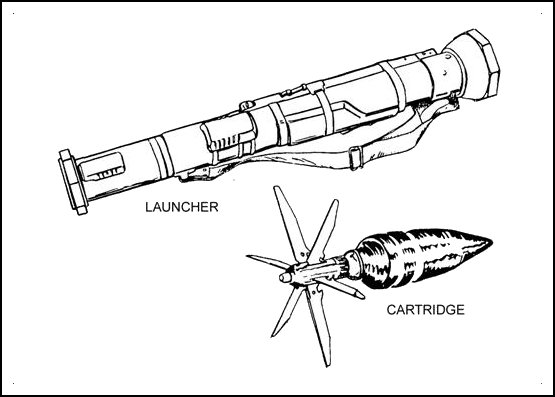
AT4 launcher and projectile

High-explosive anti-tank (HEAT) – Can penetrate up to 45 centimetres (18 in) of rolled homogeneous armour (RHA) with beyond-armour effect.

High-explosive dual purpose (HEDP) 502 (Note: the complete disposable launcher and HEDP projectile is referred to by the manufacture in brochures as the LMAW (light multipurpose-assault weapon) see external links for link on early photos and press releases for further information on brochure<) – For use against bunkers, buildings, enemy personnel in the open, and light armour. It can be set to detonate on impact or with a brief detonation delay. The heavier nose cap allows either to penetrate light walls or windows before exploding, or to be "skipped" off the ground for an air burst. For use against light armour, there is a smaller-cone HEAT warhead with 15 centimetres (5.9 in) penetration of RHA.

High penetration (HP) – Extra high penetration ability, up to 42–60 centimetres (17–24 in) of RHA.

Anti-structure tandem-warheads (AST) – Designed for urban warfare where a projectile heavier than the HEDP AT4 is needed. This combines a shallow-coned HEAT warhead (resulting in low penetration but producing a wide hole) with a tandem-charge and a follow-through high-blast warhead. It has two settings: either to destroy bunkers or to mouse-hole a building wall for combat entry.

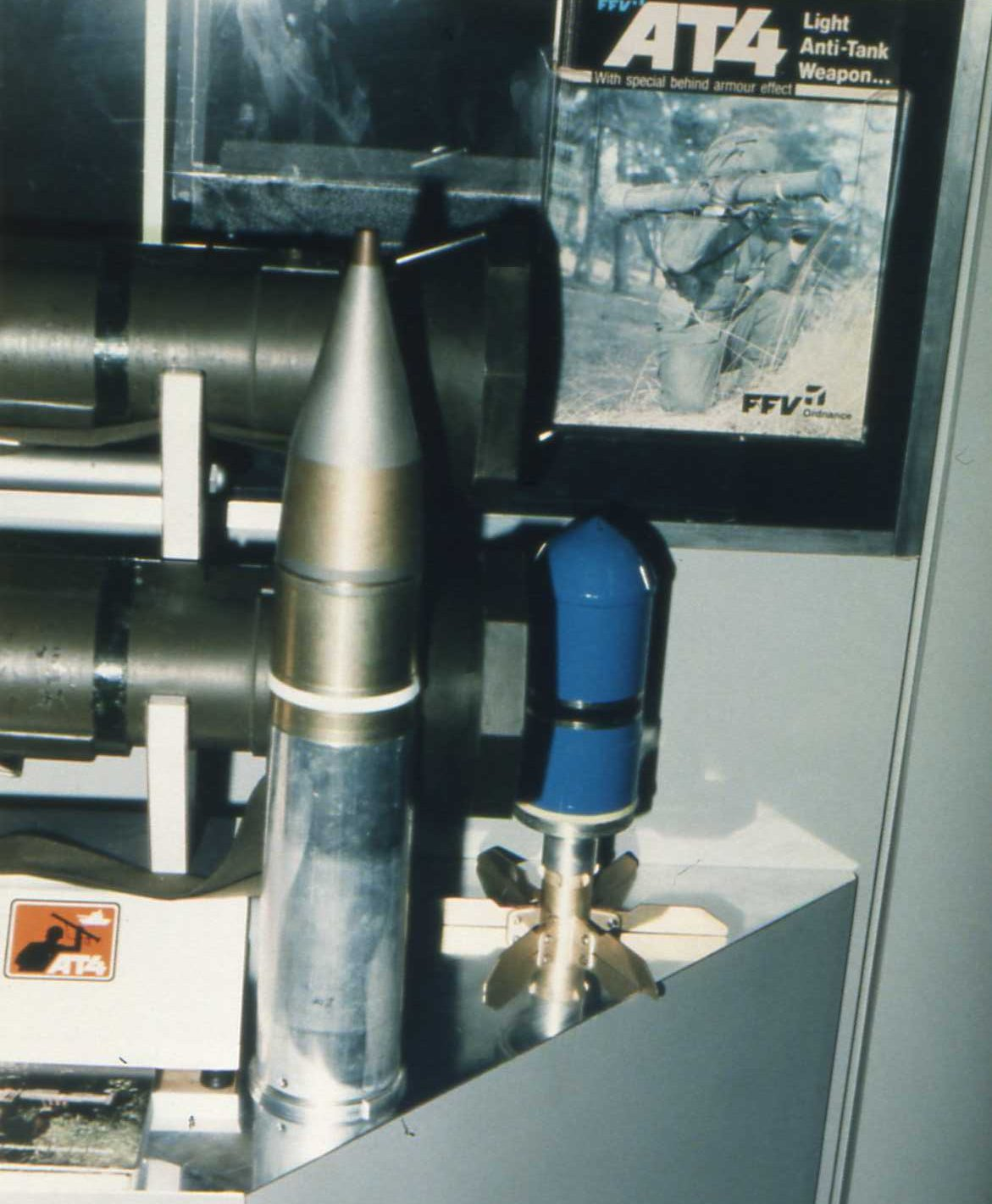
Complete AT4 HEAT antitank round (which is preloaded in AT4) and AT8 bunker-busting warhead

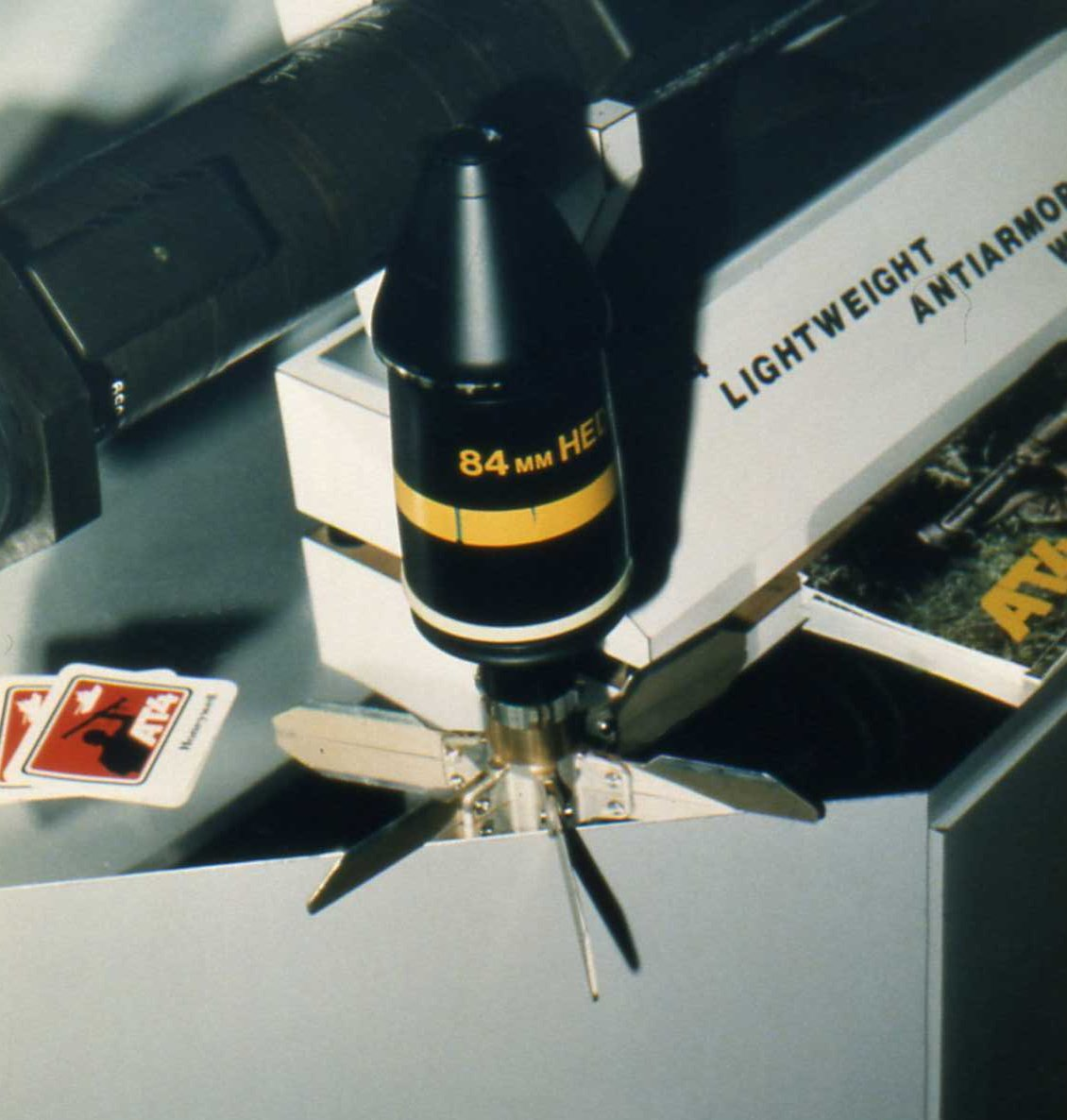
HEDP 502 projectile for the LMAW

Extended range (ER) – Anti-armor version with HEAT warhead. Range is extended from 300 to 600 metres (980 to 1,970 ft), with increased penetration up to 46 centimetres (18 in) of RHA. These major improvements add only about 2 kilograms of mass, despite being CS models.

High explosive (HE) – High explosive anti-personnel weapon that can be set for impact or air-burst detonation, with an effective range up to 1,000 metres (3,300 ft).

== Variants ==
=== M136 AT4 ===
American version with modified launch tube bumpers, sights, and slings. The M136 AT4 is no longer in production for the U.S. Army and has been replaced by the M136A1 AT4 Confined Space Reduced Sensitivity (CS RS).

=== M136A1 AT4CS-RS ===
American variant with a unique bi-metal warhead design, specially developed to maximize behind-armor effects for higher kill probability. The weapon is capable of firing from confined spaces (CS) and features a reduced sensitivity (RS) explosive, with penetration capabilities of up to 500 mm of armor. Its effective range is 20–300 m.

=== XM919 Individual Assault Weapon ===
American future variant (also known as AT4CS TW), to enter service in 2025, and be delivered by 2029 for USD $500 million.

=== Bunker-busting (AT8) ===
An AT4 version where the standard HEAT projectile is replaced with the bunker-busting warhead developed for the Mk 153 Shoulder-Launched Multipurpose Assault Weapon (SMAW). No orders were ever placed.

=== AT12-T ===
In the early 1990s, there were tests of a tandem charge 120mm version (Bofors AT 12-T). The 14kg weapon had a claimed penetration of 90 centimetres (35 in) RHA, and in 1994 was demonstrated to defeat two NATO Single Heavy targets inclined at 68 degrees from vertical with ERA, for a line-of-sight penetration of 600mm. However, the project was cancelled due to the dissolution of the Soviet Union and the subsequent cuts in Western defence budgets.

== Operators ==
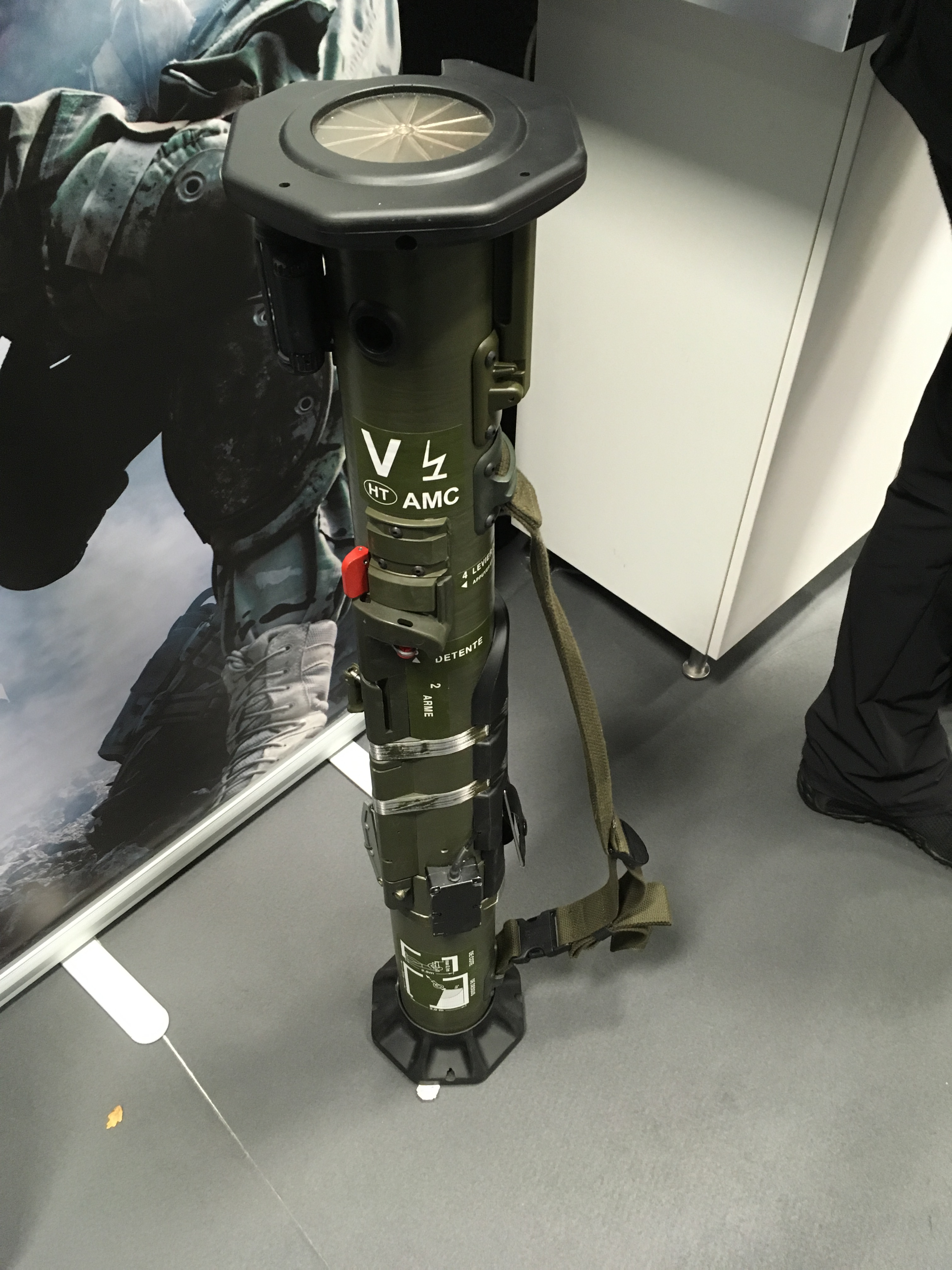
AT4 84 mm.

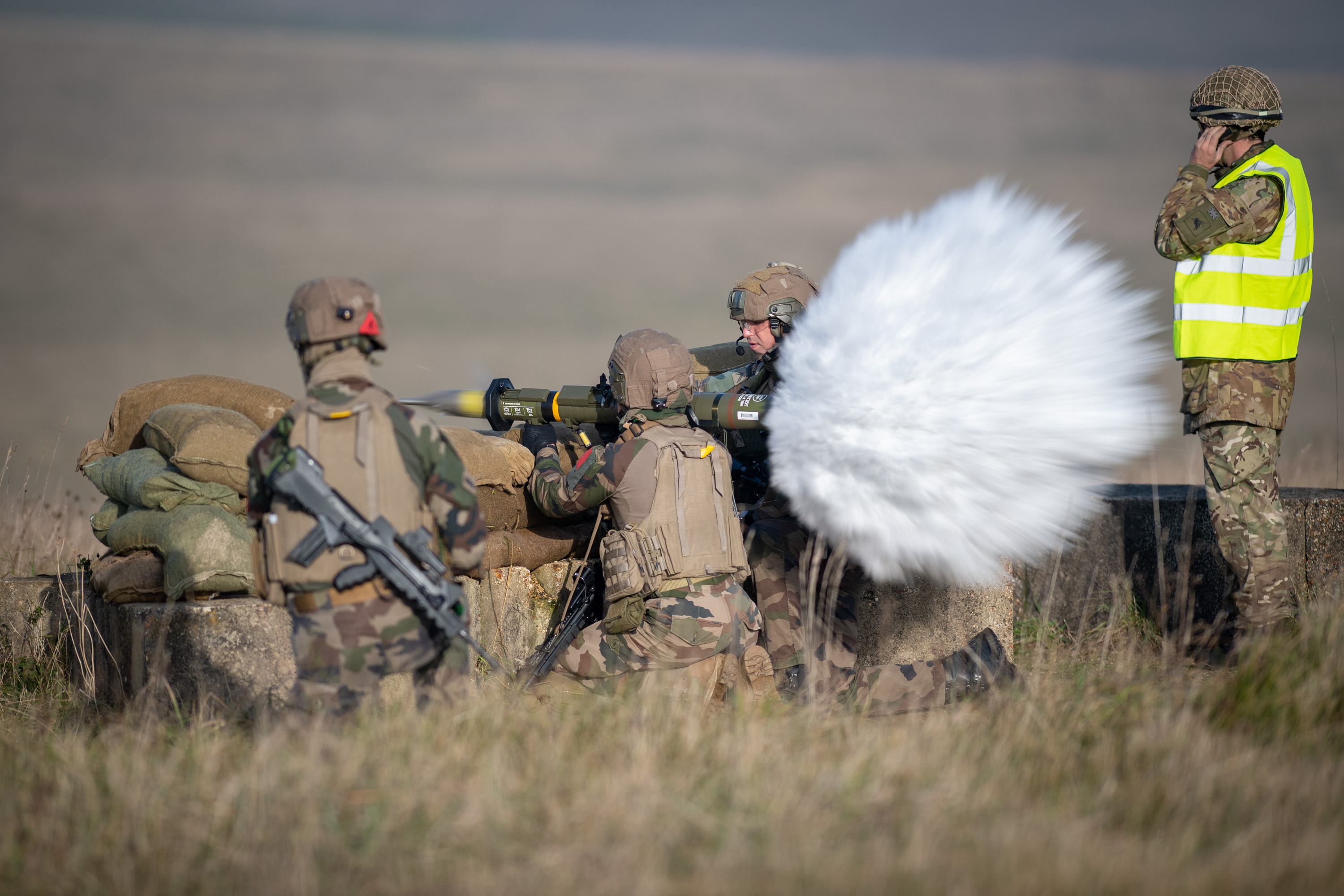
AT4 fired during Wessex Storm 2020.

- Argentina: Argentine Army and Argentine Marines
- Bosnia and Herzegovina
- Brazil
- Canada: JTF2
- Chile: Chilean Marine Corps, Chilean Army.
- Colombia
- Croatia
- Denmark: Designated PVV M/95 (Panserværnsvåben Model 1995).
- Dominican Republic
- Finland
- France: Designated ABL (Anti Blindé Lourd) by the French Army.
- Georgia
- Greece: Used by Hellenic Navy Seals.
- India: Order placed by the Army and Air Force in January 2022. Deliveries to Army completed by February 2025.
- Indonesia
- Iraq: The Iraqi Army was supplied with the AT4.
- Israel: Locally produced licensed AT4 CS AST
- Kurdistan: The Peshmerga had up to 1,000 AT-4s in 2016
- Ireland: Called the SRAAW (Short Range Anti Armour Weapon) by the Irish Defence Forces.
- Jaysh al-Islam: Captured from the Syrian Democratic Forces.
- Kurdistan Workers' Party
- Latvia
- Lebanon: Roughly 1,000 pieces purchased.
- Lithuania: Lithuanian Armed Forces
- Malaysia: In service with the Grup Gerak Khas. (probably retired)
- Mexico
  - Gulf Cartel
- Netherlands Replaced by Pzf-3.
- Poland: Limited use in Special Operations Forces and Air Mobile Forces.
- Sweden: Designated Pansarskott m/86.
- Syrian Democratic Forces
- Taiwan (Republic of China)
- United Kingdom: Small quantities of AT4 and HP projectiles purchased.
- Ukraine: 15,000 supplied by Sweden, 6,000 supplied by the United States, both in 2022. More than 1,000 by France.
- United States: Designated M136 AT4 in USMC and United States Army service, beginning in early 1987. The AT4 was used in the US invasion of Panama, the War in Afghanistan, the Persian Gulf War, and the Iraq War. Over 300,000 have been built locally, under license by ATK.
- Venezuela: The AT4 has been in the Venezuelan arsenal since the 1980s. In 2009, it was reported that AT4s sold to Venezuela had been captured from FARC insurgents in Colombia, leading Colombia to accuse Venezuela of selling the weapons to the insurgents, and Venezuela reporting that they were stolen by a rebel attack on a Venezuelan position in 1995, thus heightening tensions between the two countries.

== Wars ==
- US invasion of Panama
- Kurdish–Turkish conflict (1978–present)
- Soviet–Afghan War
- Gulf War
- War in Afghanistan (2001–2021)
- Iraq War
- Second Ivorian Civil War
- Mali War
- 2013 Lahad Datu standoff
- War in Iraq (2013–2017)
- Syrian Civil War
- Russian invasion of Ukraine

== See also ==
- List of rocket launchers
- List of anti-tank missiles
- ALAC (Arma Leve Anticarro)
- Alcotan-100 – (Spain)
- APILAS – (France)
- B-300 – (Israel)
- DZJ-08 – (China)
- LAW 80 – (United Kingdom)
- MARA – (Argentina)
- MATADOR – (Israel, Singapore)
- NLAW – (Sweden, United Kingdom)
- Panzerfaust 3 – (West Germany)
- RPG-76 Komar – (Polish People's Republic, Poland)
- RPG-75 – (Czechoslovakia)
- Urban Assault Weapon – (United States)
- M141 Bunker Defeat Munition – (United States)
- Kestrel – (Taiwan)
- Mk 153 SMAW – (United States)
