= Miniman =

Pansarskott m/68 "Miniman"
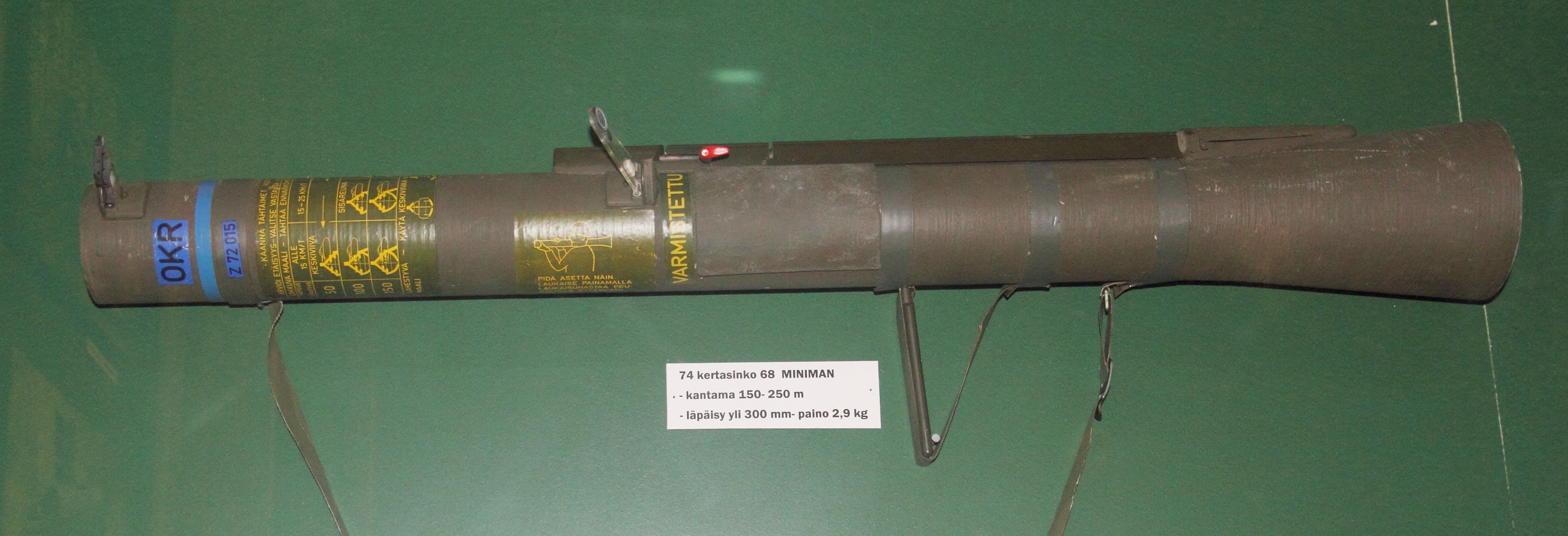
- Pansarskott m/68 "Miniman"
- Type: Disposable anti-tank rocket launcher
- Place of origin: Sweden

Service history
- In service: 1968
- Used by: See § Users

Production history
- Manufacturer: FFV Ordnance

Specifications
- Mass: 2.9 kg (6.39 lb)
- Length: 900 mm (35.43 in)
- Crew: 1-2
- Cartridge: HEAT
- Caliber: 74 mm (2.9 in)
- Action: High–low chamber launch system
- Muzzle velocity: 160 m/s (520 ft/s)
- Effective firing range: Moving target: 150 m (160 yd); Stationary target: 250 m (270 yd)
- Maximum firing range: 250 m (270 yd)
- Feed system: Single-shot
- Filling: Octol
- Filling weight: 330 g (12 oz)

The Miniman (Swedish military designation Pansarskott m/68, abbreviated Pskott m/68) is a disposable single-shot 74-mm unguided anti-tank smooth bore recoilless weapon, designed in Sweden by Försvarets Fabriksverk (FFV) and became operational in 1968.

== Description ==
The Miniman is delivered with the HEAT projectile pre-loaded launch tube. In appearance, the Miniman is similar to a single section tube US M72 LAW and French Sarpac of the same era. In 1986 the Swedish Army adopted the FFV AT4, designated the Pansarskott m/86, to replace the Miniman. FFV engineers adopted the rugged but simple firing and safety mechanism of the Miniman for the AT4. The Miniman uses a unique version of the high–low chamber launch system that results in no recoil.

Moving targets can be attacked at a range of 150 m (490 ft) while stationary targets may be engaged out to 250 metres (820 ft). The Miniman's HEAT projectile has a copper liner and can penetrate 340 mm (13 in) of rolled homogeneous armour.

== Users ==
=== Former users ===
- Austria – known as PAR 70 (Panzerabwehrrohr 70).
- Finland – known as 74 KES 68 Miniman (74 millimetrin kertasinko malli 1968 Miniman, '74 millimetre disposable recoilless rifle model 1968 Miniman').
- Sweden – known as Pskott m/68 (Pansarskott modell 1968), replaced by the m/86.

== See also ==
- List of rocket launchers
- List of anti-tank missiles
