= 73mm LRAC =

LRAC 73-50
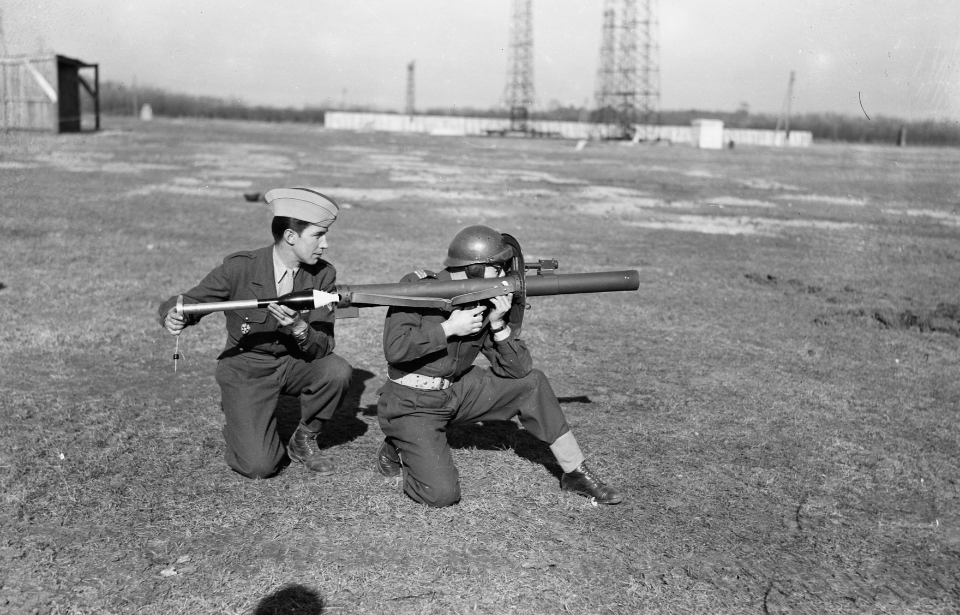
- French 73mm LRAC
- Type: Anti-tank rocket launcher
- Place of origin: France

Service history
- Used by: France; Israel; Morocco
- Wars: Korean War; First Indochina War; Algerian War; Six-Day War; Lebanese Civil War

Production history
- Manufacturer: DEFA

Specifications
- Mass: 6.7 kg (14.7 lb)
- Length: 1.2 m (3.9 feet)
- Caliber: 73 mm
- Rate of fire: 4 rounds per minute
- Muzzle velocity: 170 m/s (557.7 ft/s)
- Effective firing range: 200 m (656.2 feet)
- Maximum firing range: 1,200 m (3,937 feet)
- Filling: RDX/TNT
- Filling weight: 300 g (11 oz)

External image
- LRAC 73-50
- LRAC 73-50, showing firing shield and sight

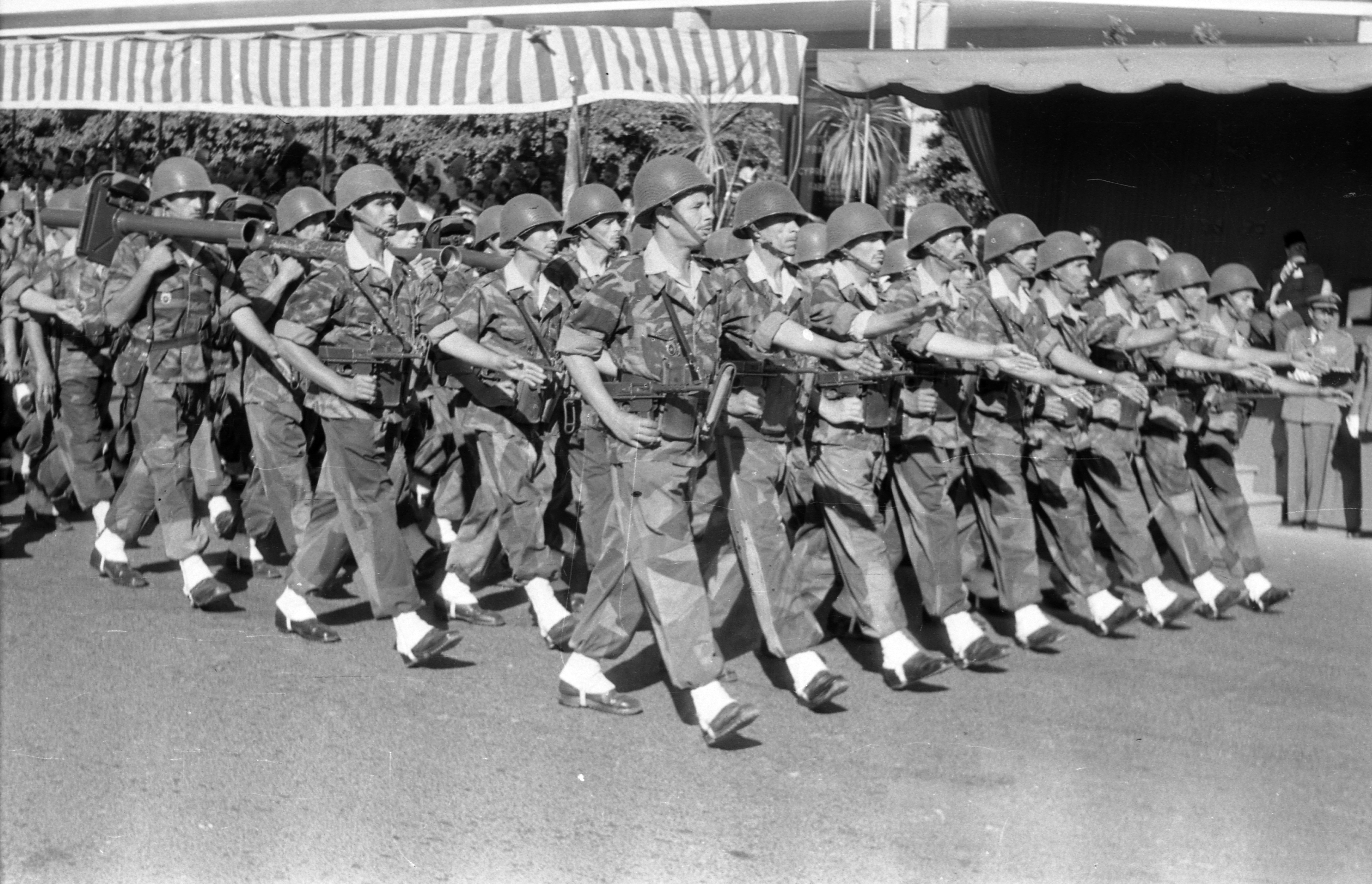
Moroccan troops with 73mm LRAC, 1960.

The LRAC de 73mm Mle 1950 (lance-roquettes antichar de 73 mm modèle 1950 (LRAC 73-50)) was a French antitank rocket launcher produced and fielded in the 1950s. The LRAC fired a 73 mm (2.9 in) high explosive antitank projectile that was capable of penetrating over 11 inches (280 mm) of rolled homogenous armor when struck at a 90-degree angle of impact. The LRAC 73-50 was replaced in French service by the LRAC F1. Used during the Korean War for the French Battalion of the United Nations Organisation, it pierced the armor of T-34 tanks.

The LRAC 73-50 had a shield to protect the operator's face from the rocket's back-blast.

== Bibliography ==
- Samer Kassis, 30 Years of Military Vehicles in Lebanon, Beirut: Elite Group, 2003. ISBN 9953-0-0705-5
- J. E. Stauff, J. Guillot, and R. Dubernet, Comité pour l'histoire de l'armement terrestre (COMHART) Tome 10 Armements Antichars Missiles Guidés et Non Guidés, Délégué Général pour l'Armement, 1996
- John Bollendorf, ST-CW-07-29-74 Projectile Fragment Identification Guide Foreign, Defense Intelligence Agency, Washington: GPO, 31 December 1973 (DIA Guide)
