= Urban Assault Weapon =

The Urban Assault Weapon is a U.S. Army program to develop a next-generation shoulder-launched infantry weapon to replace the current M72 LAW, M136 AT-4, and M141 Bunker Defeat Munition.

== See also ==
- FGM-172 SRAW
