= Backblast area =

Area where hot gas is expelled from a recoilless launcher during firing

The backblast area is a cone-shaped area behind a rocket launcher, rocket-assisted takeoff unit or recoilless rifle, where hot gases are expelled when the rocket or rifle is discharged. The backblast area is dangerous to ground personnel, who may be burned by the gases or exposed to overpressure caused by the explosion. In confined spaces, common in urban warfare, even the operators themselves may be at risk due to deflection of backblast by walls or sturdier civilian vehicles behind them.

Soft launch methods diminish backblast by ejecting the projectile some distance before its main rocket motor ignites. Backblast can also be reduced by adding a countermass that is expelled out the rear of the weapon. For example, the AT4-CS (confined space variant) uses saltwater, along with a lower-velocity projectile. A more current example is NLAW, using a combination of soft-launch and saltwater countermass.

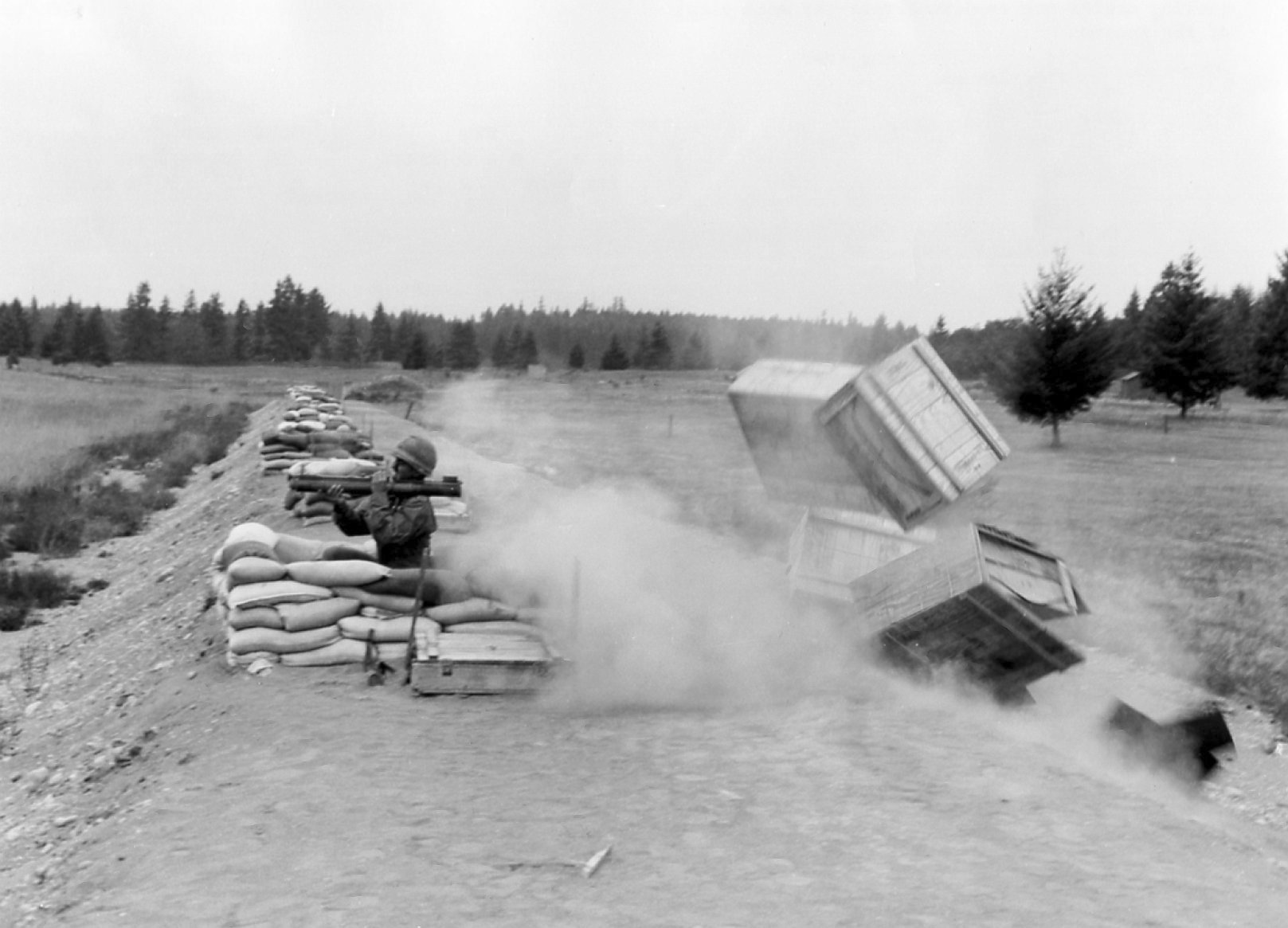
Packing crates are used to demonstrate the danger of the M72 LAW back blast

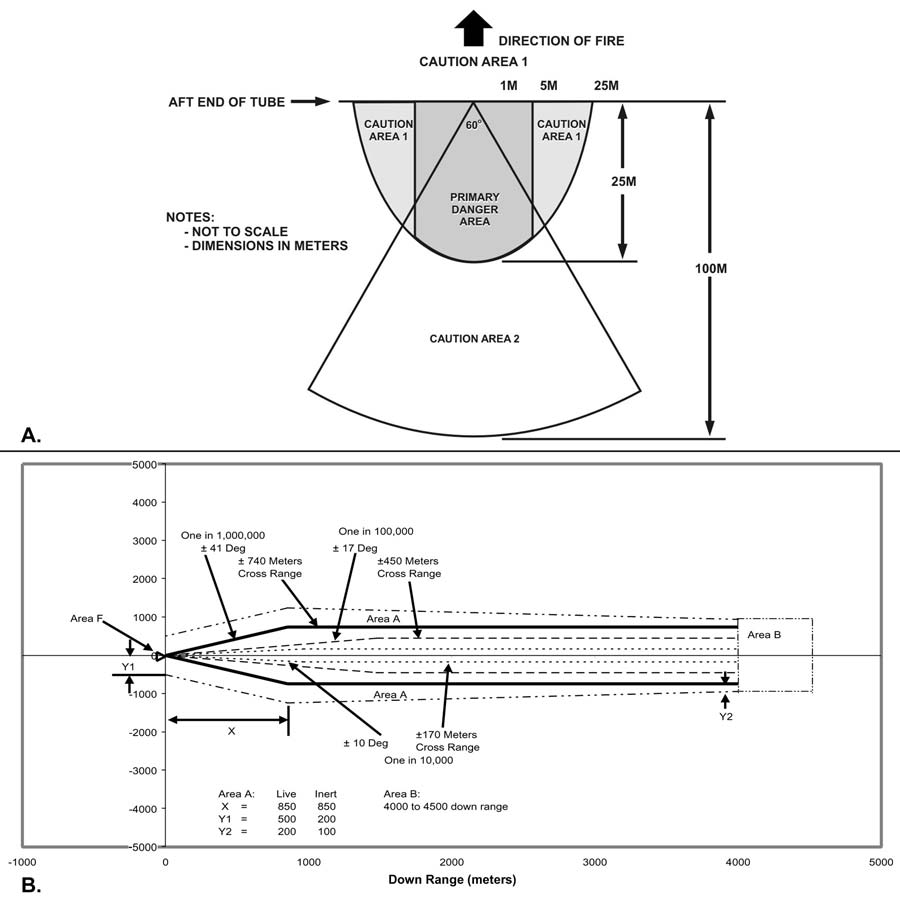
Backblast area for FGM-148 Javelin

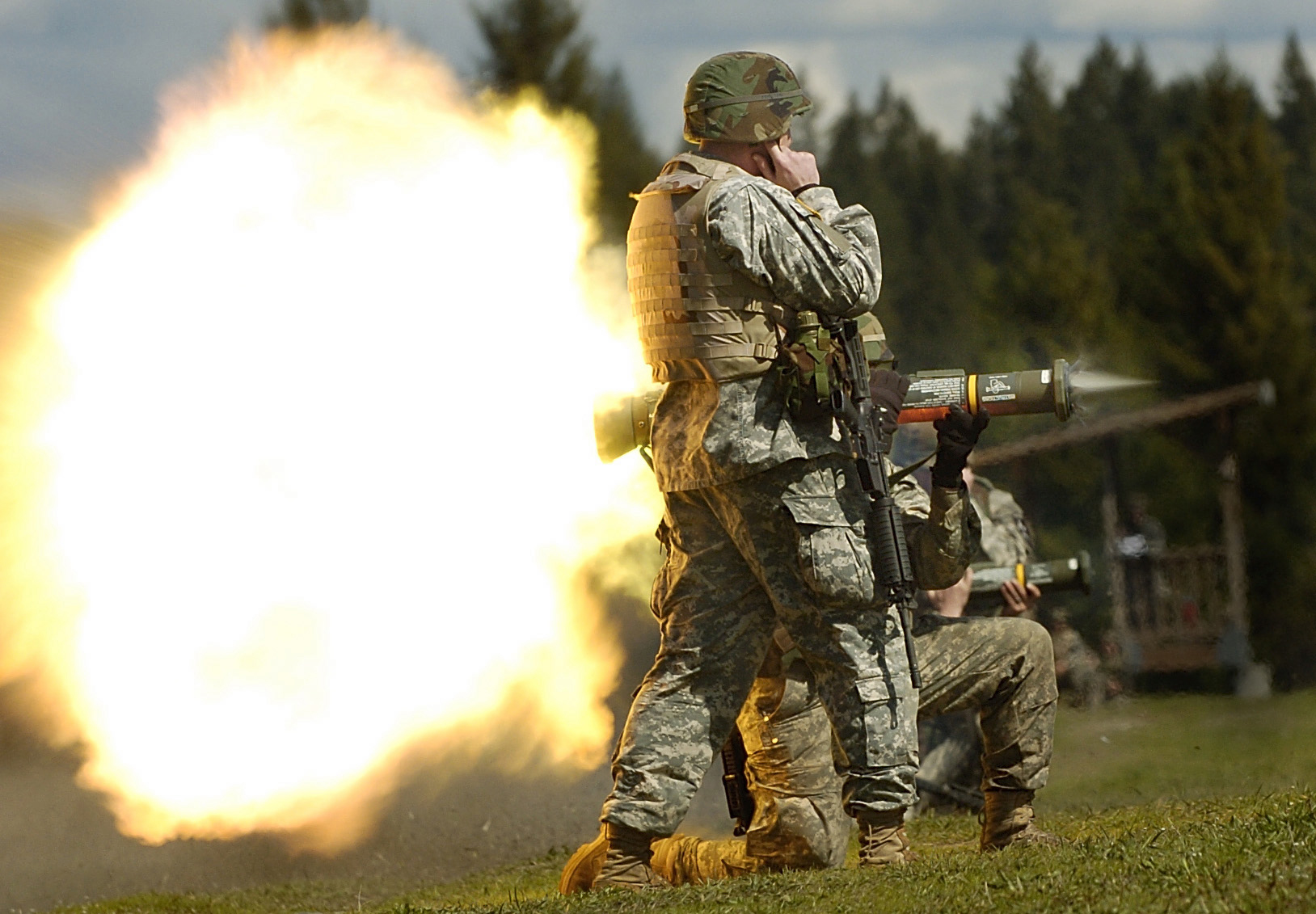
A US Army soldier firing the M136 AT4 (2007)

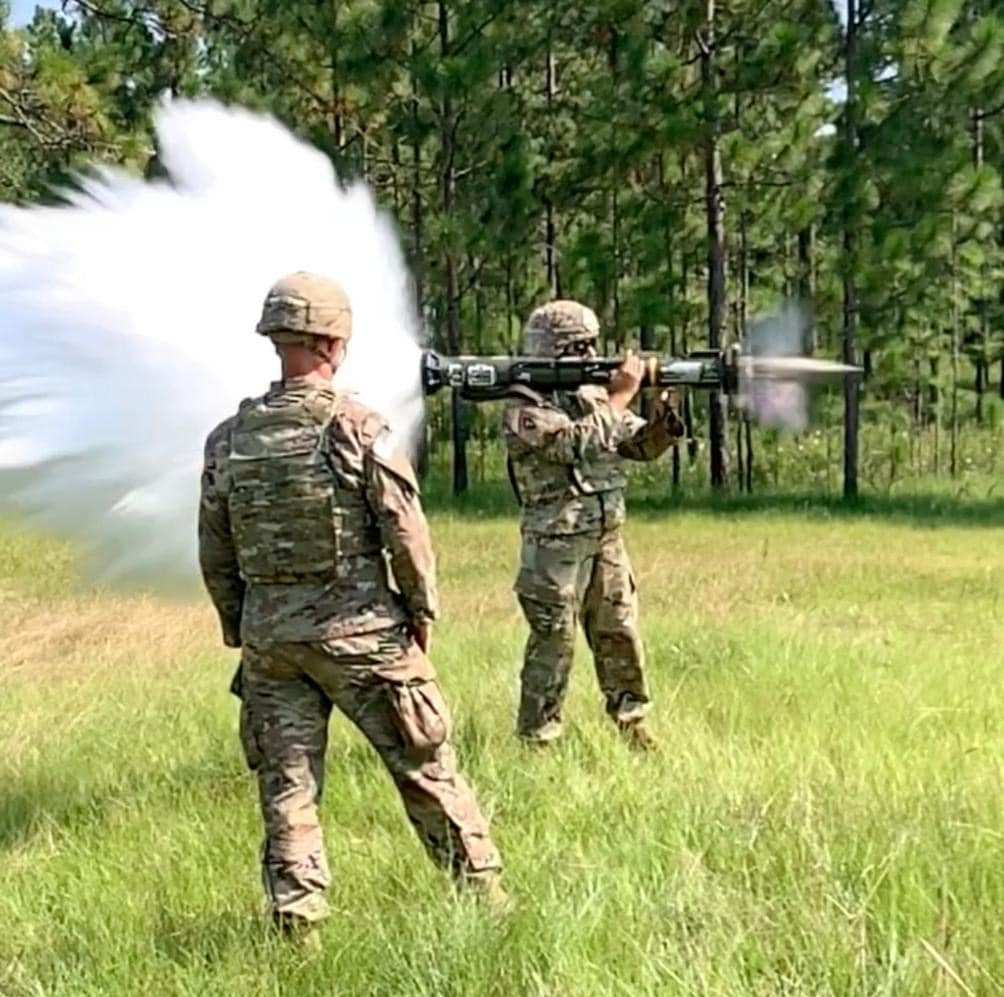
A US Army soldier firing the AT4-CS (2020)
