= List of rocket launchers =

The following is a list of rocket launchers

Note, rocket launchers are different from recoilless rifles, grenade launchers, or anti-tank guided missiles.

== List ==
Name	Manufacturer	Image	Country	Year	Source
Kestrel (rocket launcher)	NCSIST		Republic of China	2015	
B-300	Israel Military Industries		Israel	1970s	
Bazooka	Unknown		United States	1942	
C-100	Instalaza SA		Spain	1998	
C90-CR (M3)	Instalaza SA		Spain	1990	
Dard 120	Societe Europeenne de Propulsion		France	1978	
FHJ-84	Norinco		China	1984	
LAW 80	Hunting Engineering		United Kingdom	1987	
LRAC F1	Manufacture Nationale d'Armes de Saint-Etienne		France	1970	
M202A1 FLASH	Northrop Corporation		United States	1978	
RPG-2	Unknown		Soviet Union	1954	
RPG-7	Bazalt and Degtyaryov Plant		Soviet Union	1961	
RPG-16	Bazalt		Soviet Union	1976	
RPG-18	Bazalt and VEB Mechanische		Soviet Union	1972	
RPG-22	Bazalt		Soviet Union	1985	
RPG-26	Bazalt		Soviet Union	1985	
RPG-28	Bazalt		Russia	2011	
RPG-30	Bazalt		Russia	2012	
RPG-29	Bazalt		Soviet Union	1989	
RPG-32	JADARA		Russia	2012	
RPO Rys	KBP		Soviet Union	1975	
RPO-A Shmel	KBP		Soviet Union	1984	
MK-153 (SMAW)	Nammo		United States	1984	
M72 LAW	Nammo		United States	1963	
MRO-A	Bazalt		Russia	2003	
Nexter WASP 58 Light Anti-Armour Weapon	Luchaire SA		France	1987	
Pancéřovka 27	Konstrukta Brno		Czechoslovakia	1950	
Panzerfaust 3	Dynamit Nobel AG		West Germany	1992	
Panzerschreck	Unknown		Germany	1943	
PF-89	Norinco		China	1989	
PF-98	Norinco		China	1998	
PzF 44	Dynamit Nobel		West Germany	1963	
RAK-74 Raketenrohre NORA	Société Anonyme Constructions Mécaniques du Léman (CML)		Switzerland	1980	
Type 70	Unknown		Japan	1944	
VE-NILANGAL	Unknown		Venezuela		

== See also ==
- List of grenade launchers
- List of MANPATS (man-portable anti-tank systems)
- List of ATGM (anti-tank guided missiles)
- List of recoilless rifles
