= Pancéřovka 27 =

Czechoslovak rocket-propelled grenade launcher

Pancéřovka vz. 27
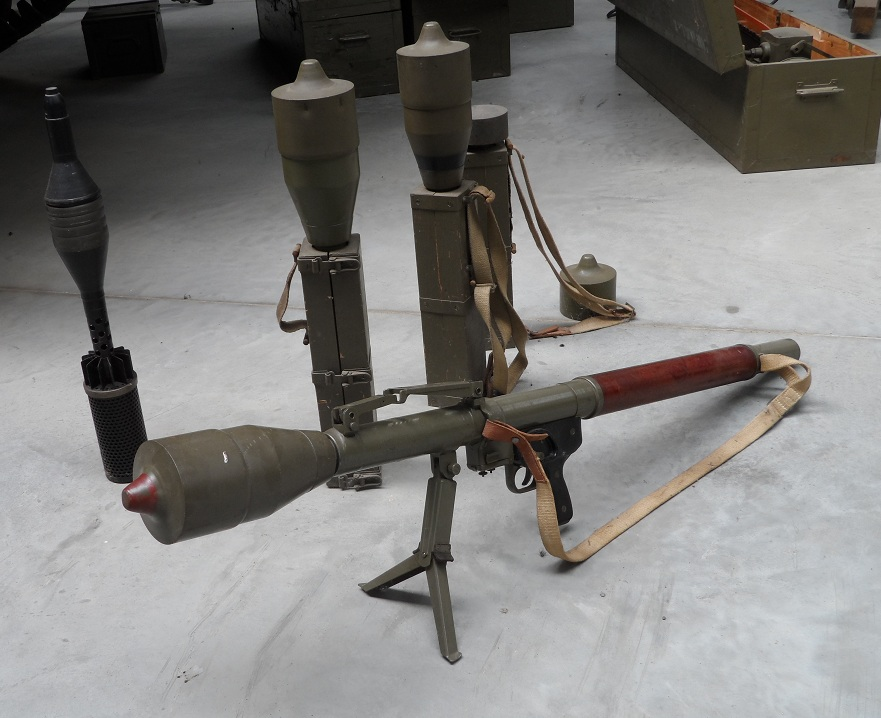
- Type: Rocket launcher
- Place of origin: Czechoslovakia

Service history
- In service: 1950-1970s
- Used by: See Users
- Wars: Algerian War; Nigerian Civil War; Portuguese Colonial War

Production history
- Designer: Ladislav Urban
- Designed: 1947-1950
- Manufacturer: Konstrukta Brno and Zbrojovka Vsetín
- Produced: 1950-1955
- No. built: 30,000

Specifications
- Mass: 6.40 kg (14.11 lb) (without rocket) 7.25 kg (15.98 lb) (with rocket)
- Length: 1,030 mm (40.6 in)
- Cartridge: 98 mm (3.9 in)
- Caliber: 45 mm (1.8 in)
- Effective firing range: 100 m (328 ft)
- Maximum firing range: 150 m (492 ft)
- Sights: Iron sights

The Pancéřovka vz. 27 is a Czechoslovak reusable, unguided, shoulder-launched, anti-tank grenade launcher developed in the early years of the Cold War.

== Development ==
After World War II, large numbers of German anti-tank weapons were left behind in Czechoslovakia, especially the Panzerfaust (in service referred to as the Panzerfaust N) and the Panzerschreck. Therefore, Czechoslovakia began to develop its own rocket launcher which would be able to penetrate any armor up to 200 mm at that time.

The development of the Pancéřovka was ordered in December 1947, designated as PPZ. The condition was a weight of up to 5 kilograms and an effective range of 100 meters with the possibility of repeated firing. Smokeless powder was to be used as the charge.

The development was carried out by Konstrukta Brno (Prague), led by Ladislav Urban. In May 1950, the armament commission agreed to introduce the weapon under the designation Pancéřovka 75, the number being the designation of the range for moving targets. Production began at the Zbrojovka Vsetín enterprise. Several more modifications followed and the weapon was redesignated as the Pancéřovka 27. The price of the weapon in 1955 was about 1,800 CZK.

The Czechoslovak People's Army had a total of 18,400 of this weapon in stock in 1958.

It was replaced by the RPG-7 and the RPG-75 between 1963 and 1975.

== Variants ==
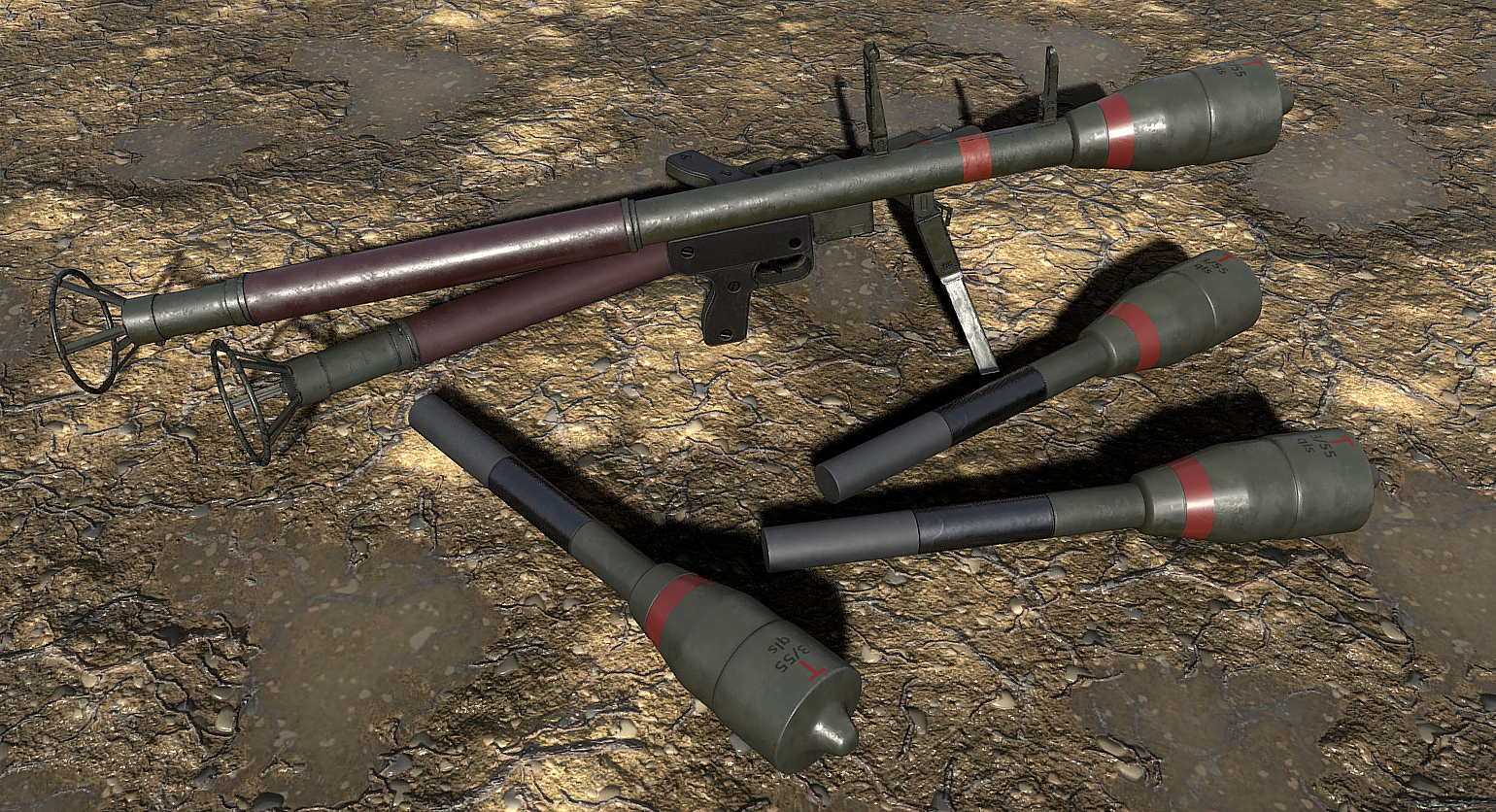
3D renders of the Pancéřovka 27A

Pancéřovka vz.27A: Improved variant introduced in 1958 following several accidents with high-pressure rockets used due to the exhaustion of the original propellant charges, which was of German origin.

== Users ==
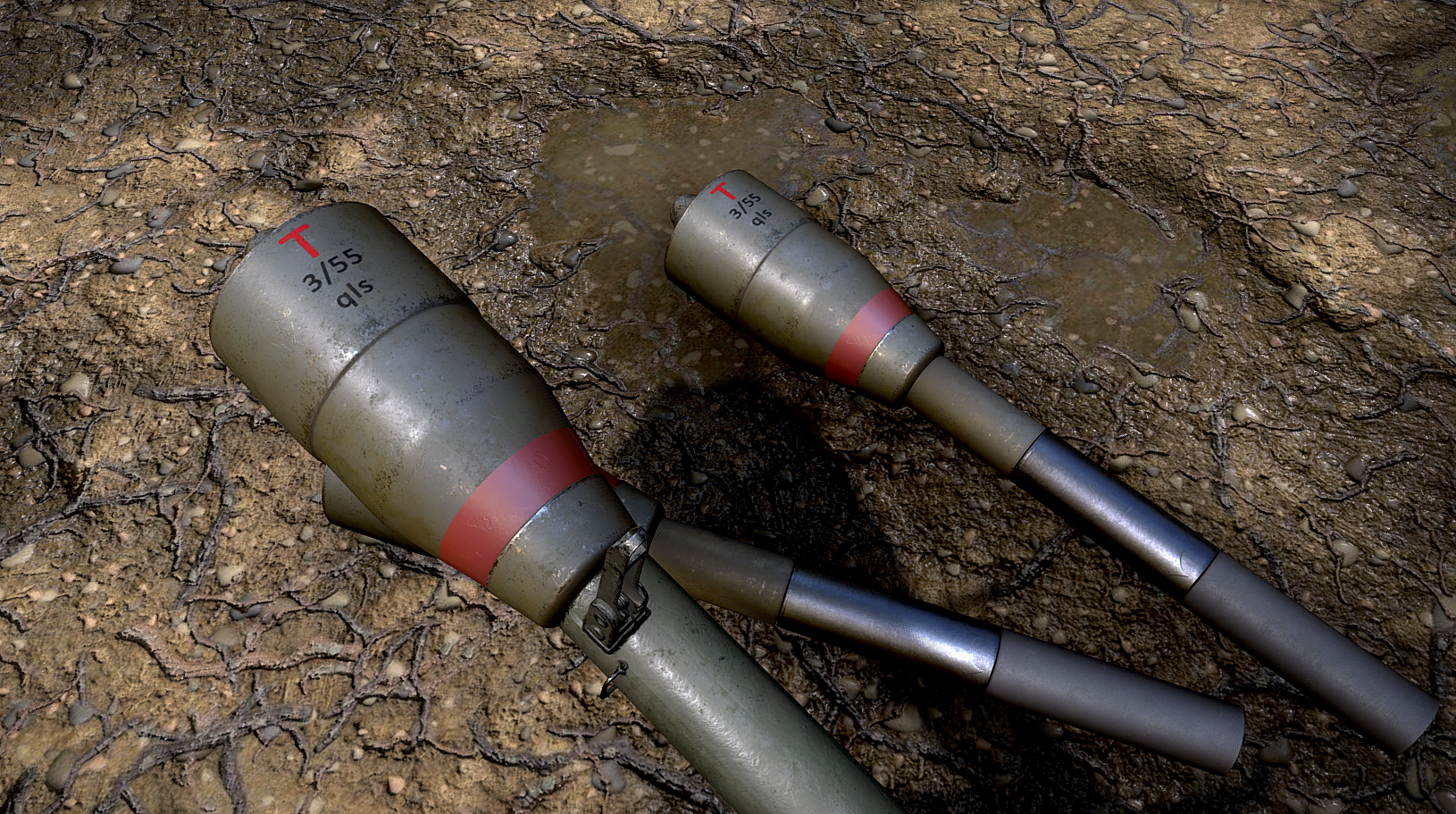
3D render of the Pancéřovka 27's rockets

- Albania: Ordered about 1,000 rocket launchers in 1954
- Algeria: supplied during the Algerian War
- Biafra: exported between 1967 and 1969
- Czechoslovakia: primary user
- Guinea-Bissau: supplied during the Portuguese Colonial War
- Mozambique
- Nigeria: exported between 1967 and 1969
- Poland: 2,600 supplied between 1951 and 1953
- United Arab Republic: uncertain amount approved in 1967

== See also ==
- Bazooka – (United States)
- RL-83 Blindicide – (Belgium)
- Panzerfaust 2 – (West Germany)
- PIAT – (United Kingdom)
- RPG-1 – (Soviet Union)
- RPG-2 – (Soviet Union)
- 55 S 55 – (Finland)
