= LAW 80 =

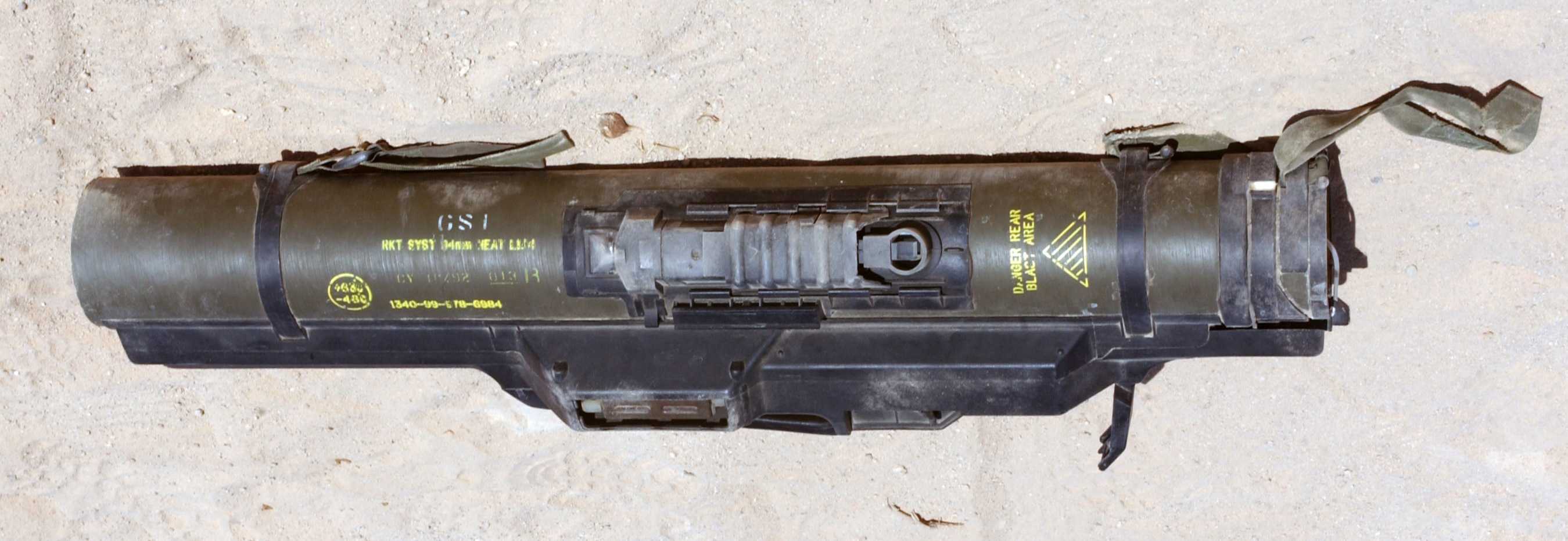
- Unextended LAW 80
- Type: Rocket-propelled grenade (anti-tank, disposable)
- Place of origin: United Kingdom

Service history
- In service: 1987–present
- Used by: See § Users
- Wars: Cold War; War on terror

Production history
- Manufacturer: Hunting Engineering
- Produced: 1986–1997
- No. built: c. 135,000

Specifications
- Mass: 9 kg (20 lb) loaded; 4.6 kg (10 lb) projectile
- Length: 1.5 m (59 in) firing; 1 m (39 in) carrying
- Crew: 1
- Calibre: 94 mm (3.7 in)
- Effective firing range: 20–500 m (66–1,640 ft)
- Sights: ×1 magnification telescopic sight
- Warhead: HEAT
- Detonation mechanism: Contact fuze
- Blast yield: 600–700 RHA
- Propellant: HTPB
- Launch platform: Man-portable launcher

The LAW 80 (Light Anti-armour Weapon 80), officially referred to as the L1A1 94mm HEAT Rocket System in British service, is a man-portable, disposable anti-tank weapon previously used by the British Army and a few other militaries.

== Description ==
The weapon consists of an extendable launch tube with an integrated 9 mm (0.35 in) spotting rifle and 1× sight. The spotting rifle has five rounds of ammunition, and is ballistically matched to the rocket. The rounds it uses are quite unusual, consisting of a 9 mm tracer bullet loaded in a necked up 7.62mm NATO shell casing, with a .22 Hornet blank mounted in the base of the larger case, providing the propellant charge. Upon firing, the .22 cartridge case pushes out of the back of the 7.62 mm casing, unlocking the breech of the spotting rifle in a form of primer actuation.

To launch the rocket the firer removes the large protective end caps and extends the rear of the launch tube, opens the sight, and moves the arming lever to "armed". The weapon is then in spotting rifle mode. To fire the rocket, the firer moves a charge lever forward with his firing hand thumb. The rocket motor burns out before it leaves the launch tube, the resulting blast being directed rearwards from the launch tube. The rocket then coasts to the target, arming itself after it has passed a certain arming distance. The warhead is a HEAT shaped charge and can penetrate between 650 mm (26 in) and c. 700 mm (28 in) of rolled homogeneous armour.

== Operators ==
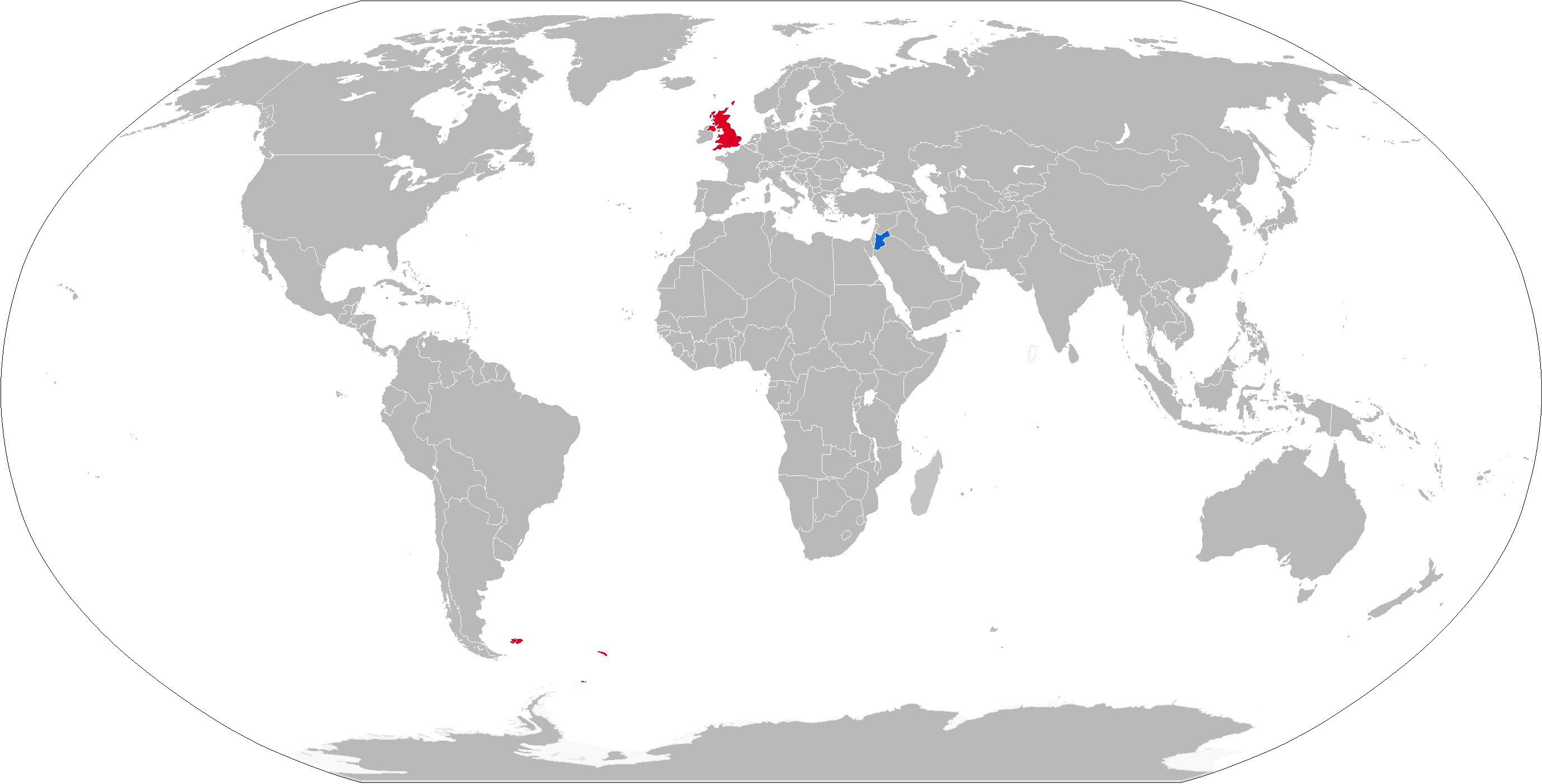
Operators Current Former

=== Current operators ===
- Botswana
- Jordan
- Sierra Leone

=== Past operators ===
- United Kingdom: Initially adopted in the early 1990s, replacing the L14A1 84 mm Carl Gustav recoilless rifle and M72 Light Anti-Tank Weapon (Rocket 66mm HEAT L1A1), it was withdrawn on safety grounds in favour of the AT-4 CS and eventually the FGM-148 Javelin anti-tank missile and NLAW.

== Addermine ==
Addermine is an acoustic sensor system which uses the LAW 80 as a kill mechanism to create an anti-armour off-route mine. It can also be command detonated from up to 200 m away, or 2 km via a laser optical link.

== See also ==
- List of rocket launchers
- ARGES mine – (United Kingdom, France, Germany)
- APILAS – (France)
- Alcotán-100 – (Spain)
