= MAT-120 =

MAT-120 Cargo Bomb
- Type: 120mm mortar cluster bomb
- Place of origin: Spain

Service history
- Used by: Spain, Libya, Finland

Production history
- Manufacturer: Instalaza SA
- Variants: MAT-81 cargo mortar bomb for 81mm mortars

Specifications
- Diameter: 120 mm
- Caliber: 120 mm
- Effective firing range: 1.6 m barrel: 5,500 m 3.0 m barrel: 6,500 m
- Warhead: 21 37mm dual purpose AP/AT submunitions
- Warhead weight: Each submunition 275 g with 50 g filling
- Detonation mechanism: Projectile: Electronic time fuze Submunition: Electronic super-quick impact fuze

The MAT-120 cargo bomb is a Spanish-produced cluster munition, fired from a 120mm calibre mortar produced by Instalaza SA. The main body of the round holds dual-purpose anti-tank/anti-personnel submunitions. The MAT-120 submunitions are unique in that to prevent the dangers of unexploded duds, there is a double redundant feature the manufacturer refers to as self-destruction and self-sterilization. This prevents unexploded MAT-120 submunitions from lying around becoming de facto landmines, dangerous to both combatants and non-combatants.

== Description ==
In the late 1980s the Spanish firm Esperanza y Cia, which later became part of Instalaza SA, developed a 120mm caliber mortar bomb which contained 21 dual anti-armor/fragmentation submunitions, each of which weighs 275 grams and is 37 millimeters in diameter. What made the 120mm MAT-120s submunition unique is the electrical impact fusing system which for all practical purposes totally eliminated the risk of unexploded duds from subsequently detonating. In addition there is no electrical energy stored in the MAT-120 round during storage, transport and even at the time it is fired from the mortar tube, thus greatly reducing any risk of premature detonation. The MAT-120 submunition's electronic impact fuse operates on a capacitor power source located in each submunition which is charged in flight after being fired by a wind generator located in the nose of the projectile. If for what ever reason the electrical fuse fails to function on impact, approximately 35 seconds later a self-destruction feature causes the submunition to detonate; if the self-destruction mechanism fails, in approximately 15 minutes after impact the electrical charge in the capacitor bleeds out, therefore rendering the submunition's electronic fuse system inoperative, rendering the dud submunition inert, unless the capacitor is deliberately recharged from an outside source.

The action of firing the round starts a timer which triggers opening the projectile, scattering the submunitions, which land in a random pattern between fifty and sixty meters in diameter. Upon impact the submunitions detonate, producing an armour-penetrating effect capable of punching through 150 millimeters of RHA and scattering 650 steel fragments out to a lethal radius of around 6 meters, and an effective radius of 18 meters. Within the impact area, the probability of hitting a tank-sized target directly is about 20 percent.

== History ==
Later a similar mortar round was offered in the 81mm caliber and equipped some Spanish Marine units. Following the signing the Wellington Declaration on Cluster Munitions, Spain withdrew the projectiles from its military units. It had destroyed most of its stockpile of 2,271 120mm MAT-120 projectiles by the end of 2008, retaining 419 (and 390 of its ESPIN predecessor) for permitted training and countermeasure development purposes. (In its 2011 Convention on Cluster Munition submission, the Spanish government reported that the number retained had fallen to 366 MAT-120 and 331 ESPIN) The Spanish Government has refused all export licence applications for cluster munitions, including this weapon, from 11 June 2008 onwards although as of April 2011 it is still listed on the product page of Instalaza's website,

In April 2011, there were news media reports of Libyan forces loyal to Gaddafi using MAT-120 mortar rounds against the besieged city of Misrata, although the Secretary of State of the US, Hillary Clinton said she was "not aware" of the specific use of cluster or other indiscriminate weapons in Misurata. The markings on some of the remnants indicated that they came from the second and third production batches of 2007. The Daily Telegraph reported that the manufacturer stated that the weapons were sold to Libya in 2008, prior to the Spanish Government ratifying the convention.

== See also ==
- U.S. produced 120 mm M984 extended-range DPICM mortar round
