= ARGES mine =

Off-route anti-tank mine

ARGES, ACEATM or MACPED is an anti-tank off-route mine, developed by an international consortium to meet the needs of the British, French and German armed forces. The system consists of a rocket and launch tube, a tripod and a sensor package.

The sensor package has an acoustic sensor that detects the approach of a suitable target and activates the passive infrared and laser sensors which trigger the launch of the rocket when the target passes in front of it.

The rocket uses a modified version of the motor from the LAW 80 anti-tank rocket, and has a tandem HEAT warhead, enabling it to penetrate the side armour of all main battle tanks, including those protected with reactive armour. The rocket has a range of between two and ninety meters, with the hit probability at ninety meters being 97%.

The mine is highly programmable with an active window of between three hours and forty days, to choose a specific target in a convoy, as well as the ability to be re-programmed. The system can also be command initiated.

== Specifications ==
- Weight: 18 to 22 kg quoted.
- Length: 1.02 m
- Height: from 230 mm to 700 mm
- Range: 2 to 97 m
- Traverse: -45 degrees to + 45 degrees
