= VE-NILANGAL Rocket Launcher =

VE-NILANGAL
- Type: Rocket Launcher
- Place of origin: Venezuela

Service history
- Used by: Venezuelan army

Production history
- Designer: Pequiven
- Designed: 2006
- Manufacturer: FAN
- Produced: 2007
- No. built: unknown

Specifications

VE-NILANGAL is a non-production prototype Venezuelan multipurpose rocket launcher created by a contract signed for Pequiven and FAN. it was designed in 2006 but never went into full production and all prototypes have been kept hidden.

== Specifications ==
Caliber: 72mm.
