= Instalaza =

Spanish explosives manufacturer

Instalaza S.A.
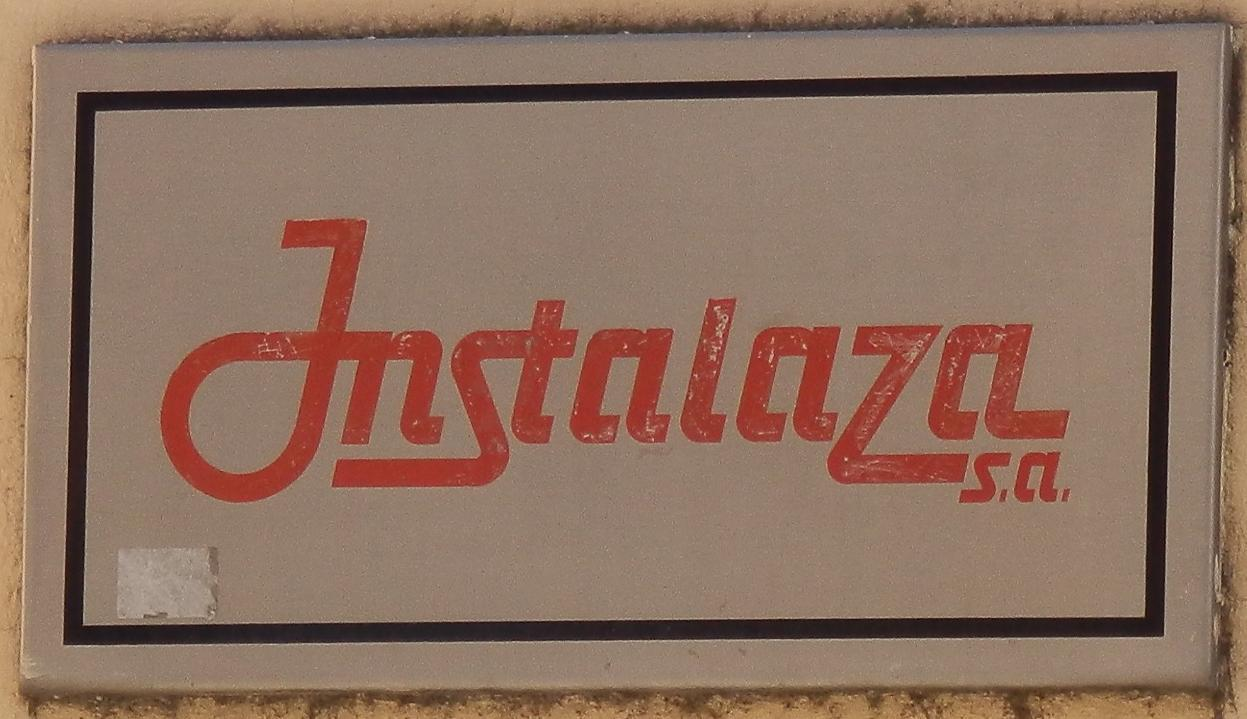
- Type: S.A.
- Industry: Defence
- Founded: 1943; 83 years ago
- Headquarters: Zaragoza, Zaragoza, Aragon, Spain
- Area served: worldwide
- Products: Explosives, Electro-optical devices
- Operating income: 12.4 million € (2011)
- Net income: ▲1.68 million € (2011)
- Number of employees: 140 (2007)
- Website: instalaza.com

Instalaza SA is a Spanish firm that designs, develops and manufactures equipment and other military material for infantry. The company, founded in 1943, is headquartered in Zaragoza, Aragon, where its production plant is also located.

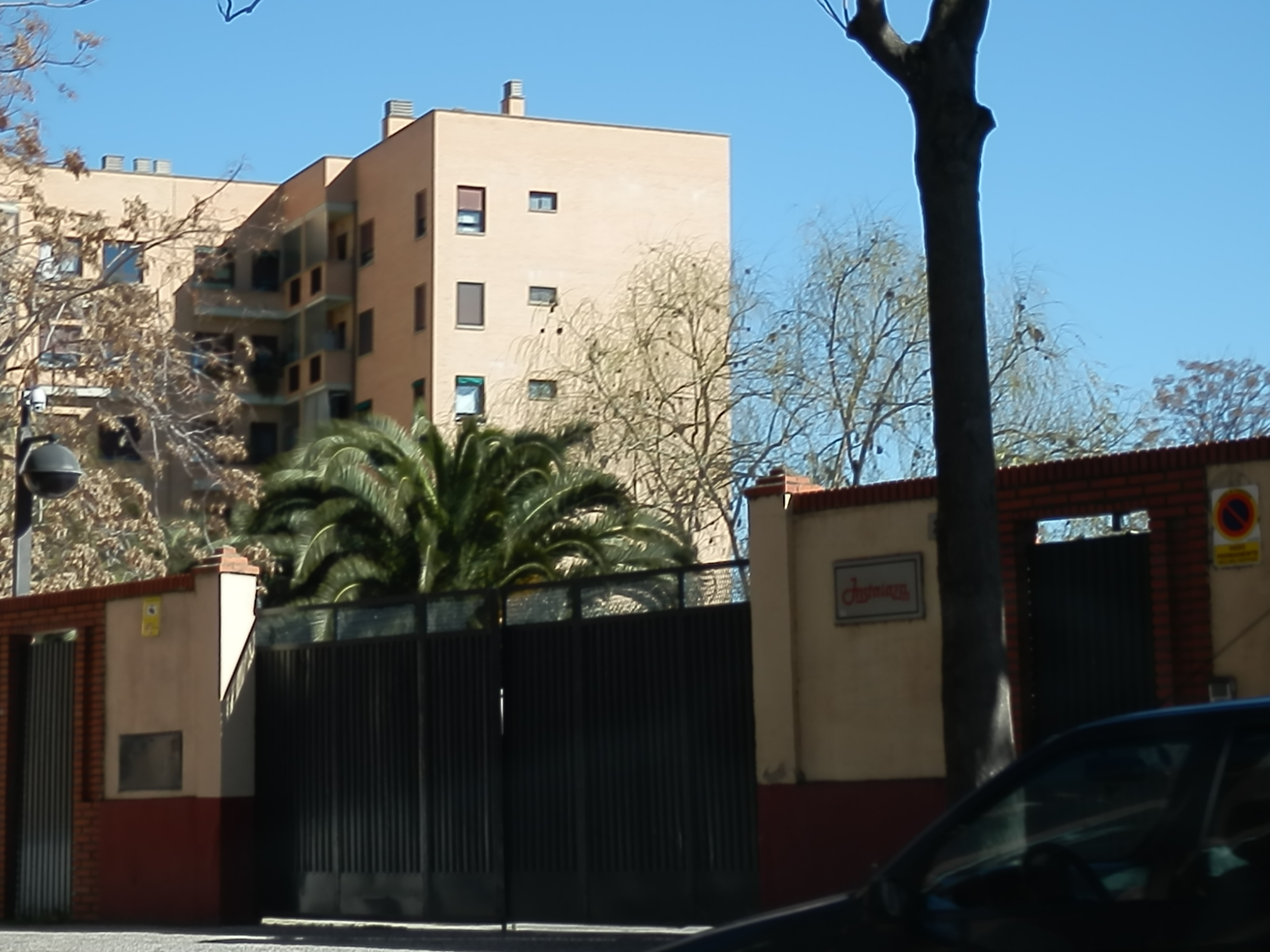
Instalaza plant in Zaragoza

Instalaza's professional experience is widely noted as a supplier of both the Spanish armed forces and countries around the world. Instalaza has had Pedro Morenés Eulate, Secretary of State for Defence between 1996 and 2000, Secretary of State Security from 2000 to 2002, Secretary of State for Science and Technology between 2002 and 2004, and currently Minister of Defence, as representative and consultant.

As of 2007, Instalaza SA had 140 employees, a covered plant area of 18,000 square metres (190,000 sq ft), capital worth more than 5 million Euros, and a revenue of 15 million Euros.

== Cluster munitions ban ==
The company experienced a crisis in 2008 after the ban on cluster bombs enacted by the Convention on Cluster Munitions. In January 2009, Instalaza still had the MAT-120 cluster bomb in its online catalogue. Having been outlawed by the Convention on Cluster Munitions, the Government ordered the shutdown of the weapon's production in line with its obligations under international law. After a public outcry highlighted by the media, Instalaza ended production of the MAT-120. However a note on the Instalaza website states that the weapon remains in the catalogue as a mark of their technological prowess and states that the weapon is in compliance with Amended Protocol II of the Convention on Certain Conventional Weapons. According to the manufacturer, the weapons produces 0.0% 'hazardous duds' by ensuring that in case the munition was not functioning upon impact, it would attempt to self-destruct in 20 seconds. If this was not possible, self-deactivation would occur after 10 minutes.

Critics argue that studies based on the Israeli-made M-85, a different type of cluster munition, have indicated that items of unexploded ordnance, whether or not they are armed, remain a serious hazard to civilian populations. However, this type of hazard does not apply to the MAT-120, as if in the rare instance the self-destruction mechanism fails, in approximately 15 minutes after impact the electrical charge in the capacitor bleeds out, therefore rendering the submunition's electronic fuse system inoperative, making the dud submunition totally inert, unless the capacitor is deliberately recharged from an outside source. Amended Protocol II relates to mines, booby traps and other devices and is not relevant to the legal status of cluster munitions. Instalaza may not sell any patents related to the bomb. Subsequently, the company managed to reorient its production and market new technology. As a result, Instalaza SA continues to produce military equipment for several countries around the world.

Instalaza in February 2013, presented its product design and production of arms and ammunition, in the Salon of Defense of Abu Dhabi, with great acceptance by buyers assistants, which reaffirms that the defense and security industry, are among the most active of the highest overall growth of Spanish exports between 2011 and 2013. This presentation was once again shown with great success, at the same Abu Dhabi Defense Hall in its 2021 version, with new optics, infrared sights, thermal cameras, as well as short-range missile prototypes, reaching a high level of sales in many countries.

=== Claimed use of cluster munitions in Libya ===
On 15 April 2011, Human Rights Watch and the New York Times documented use of MAT-120 cluster mortar rounds date-stamped 2007 in Misrata, Libya during sustained use of explosive weapons in populated areas by Gaddafi forces, although the Secretary of State of the USA, Hillary Clinton said she was “not aware” of the specific use of cluster or other indiscriminate weapons in Misrata .

== November 2022 letter bomb attempt ==
On 30 November 2022, a letter bomb was delivered to the Instalaza company headquarters in Zaragoza. Hours earlier, an officer at Ukraine's embassy in Madrid was injured when he opened a letter bomb addressed to the ambassador. Both packages came from Ukraine and this is what alarmed the arms company, which called the police. The envelope was 10 x 15 cm and an X-ray showed the explosive charge with a wire line ready to be activated when the envelope was opened. Police carried out a controlled explosion in the factory and no damage was reported. Zaragoza government representative Rosa Serrano said in an interview that the two envelopes appeared to have the same sender, since the same e-mail address was written on the back of both of them.

== Products ==
- Alcotán-100
- C90-CR (M3)
- Alhambra hand grenade
- VN-series night vision scopes for rifles and antitank rocket launchers
- MAT-120 cargo mortar
- FTV Rifle Grenade

== Notes ==
This article incorporates information from the revision as of 18 April 2010 of the equivalent article on the Spanish Wikipedia.
