= C90-CR (M3) =

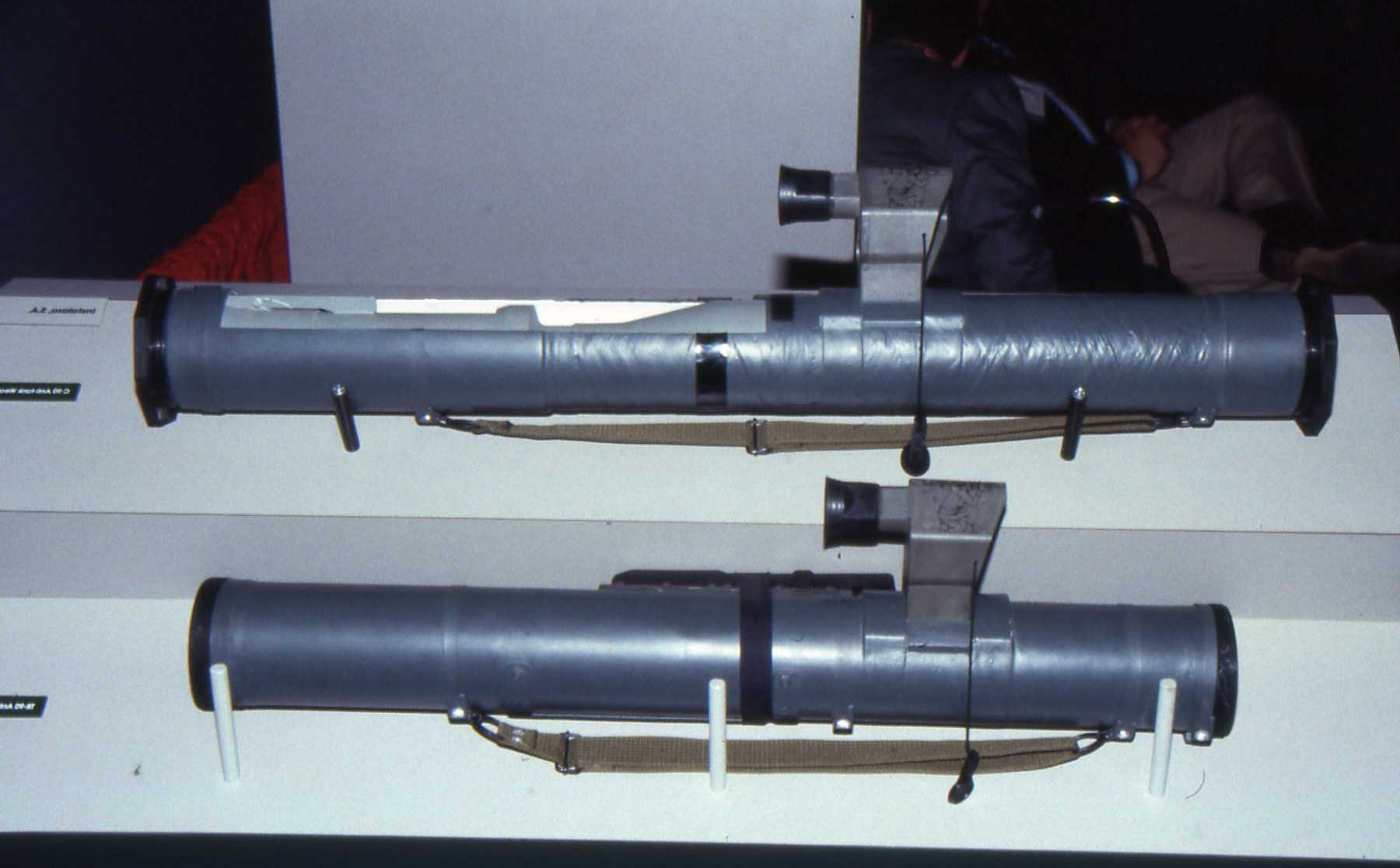
- C-90
- Type: anti-tank weapon rocket-propelled grenade predicted line of sight (PLOS)
- Place of origin: Spain

Service history
- In service: 1990–present
- Used by: see Users
- Wars: Yemeni Civil War (2014-present); Russian invasion of Ukraine

Production history
- Designer: Instalaza
- Manufacturer: Instalaza
- Unit cost: €2,099 (2022)

Specifications
- Mass: 5.3 kilograms (12 lb)
- Length: 940 millimetres (37 in)
- Cartridge: Tandem HE
- Caliber: 90 millimetres (3.5 in)
- Muzzle velocity: 160 m/sec
- Effective firing range: 350 metres (1,150 ft) (point target)
- Maximum firing range: 700 metres (2,300 ft) (area target)
- Sights: fixed 2× optical sight standard

The Instalaza C90 is a 90 millimetres (3.5 inches) disposable, shoulder-fired and one-man operated rocket-propelled grenade (RPG) launcher.

== Design ==
The C90 can be fitted with a VN38-C night vision device for full night combat capability.

It is being used as an infantry-type weapon, with Instalaza also claiming it to be the, "lightest infantry weapons system in its class".

== Variants ==
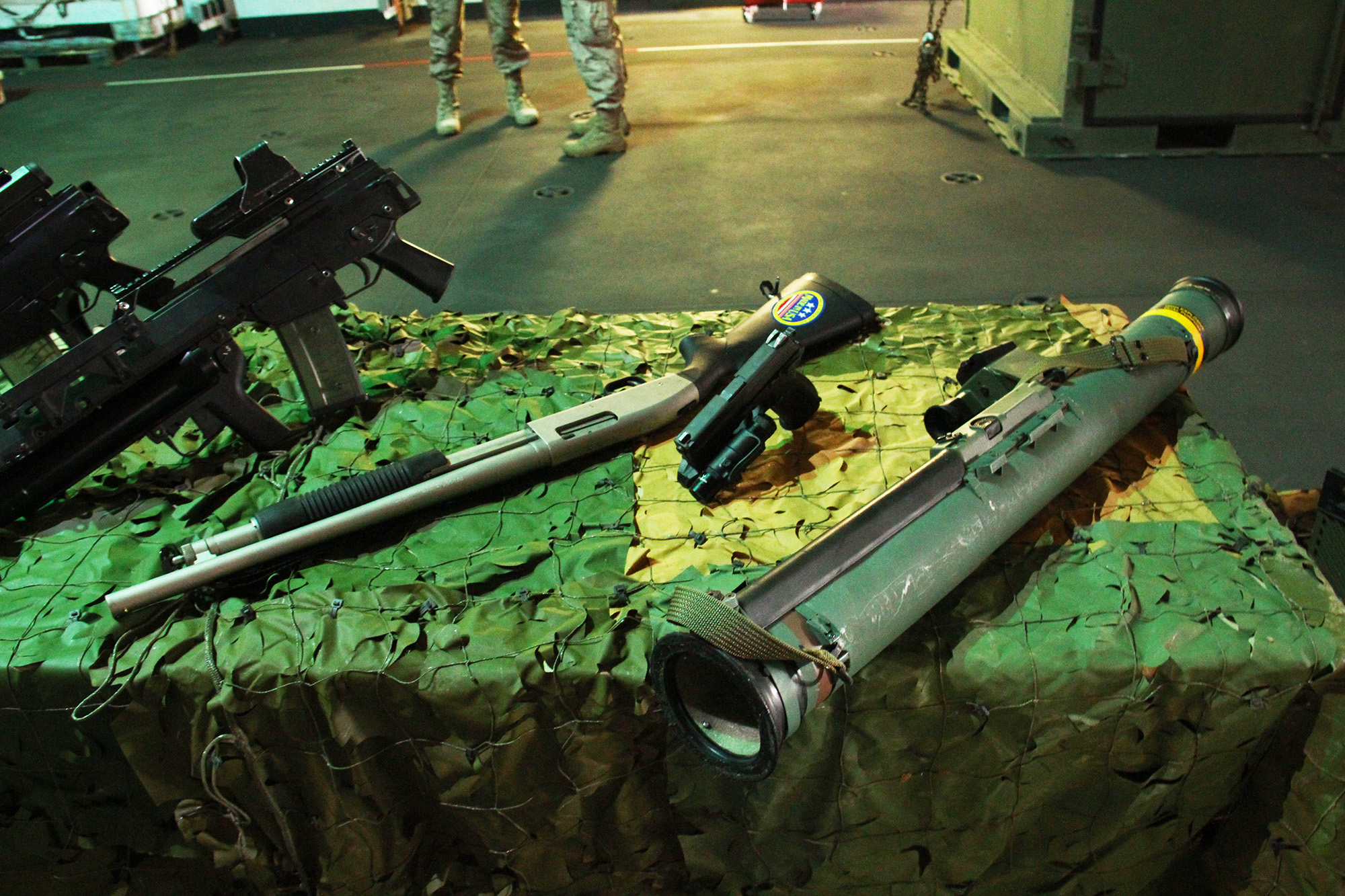
C90CR (on the right).

The following are variants produced by Instalaza:

=== C90-CR (M3) ===
Equipped with hollow-charge warhead of different types, has armour penetration of 400 millimetres (16 inches).

=== C90-CR-RB ===
Equipped with hollow-charge warhead, has armour penetration of 500 millimetres (20 inches).

=== C90-CR-AM (M3.5) ===
Equipped with a shaped head charge, but with a special body that provides anti-personnel fragmentation

=== C90-CR-FIM (M3.5) ===
contains more than 1.3 kilograms (2.9 pounds) of red phosphorus composition, producing incendiary effects and smoke

=== C90-CR-BK (M3.5) ===
Equipped with a tandem warhead precursor for anti-bunker / building fortifications; the warhead pierces the walls and goes through the wall before it explodes inside the interior.

=== C-90-CR-IN (M3) ===
Training model with inert warhead.

== Operational history ==
=== 2022 Russian invasion of Ukraine ===
After the Russian invasion of Ukraine in 2022, the Spanish government, like other Western governments, sent Ukraine shipments of weapons, equipment, ammunition, and vehicles, including numerous C90 grenade launchers. There are images of at least one Russian infantry fighting vehicle being destroyed by a C-90 near Dronivka.

== Users ==
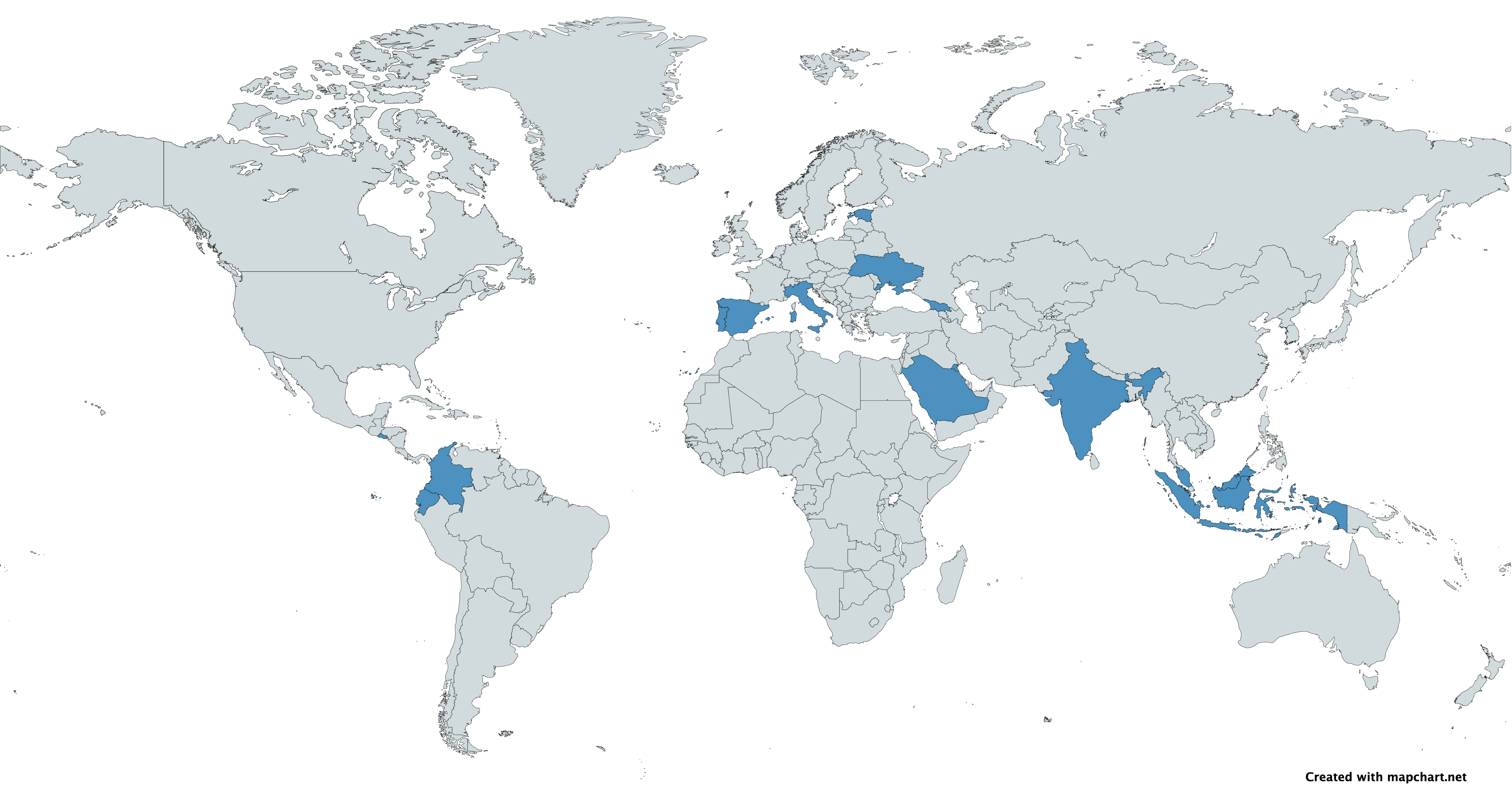
Map with C90-CR (M3) users in blue.

Brunei

- Royal Brunei Land Force

Colombia

- Colombian Army

Ecuador

- Ecuadorian Army

El Salvador

- Salvadoran Army

Estonia

- Estonian Defence Forces

Georgia

- Defence Forces of Georgia

Indonesia

- Indonesian Army − in use with the infantry units and Special Forces; versions C-90CR antiarmor, C-90-CR-RB (M3), C-90AM antipersonnel and C-90BK bunker buster

India

- Indian Army − C-90-CR-RB (M3) only

Italy

- Italian Army − in use with Special Forces; versions C-90CR antiarmor, C-90AM antipersonnel and C-90BK bunker buster

Kuwait

- Kuwait National Guard

Malaysia

- Malaysian Army − in service since 1990s; 780+178 additional units ordered in 2024

Portugal

- Portuguese Air Force

Saudi Arabia

- Saudi Arabian Army

Spain

- Spanish Army
- Spanish Marines
- Spanish Air Force
- Guardia Civil

Ukraine

- Territorial Defence Forces − 1,370 rockets

Yemen

- Yemeni Armed Forces − Supplied by Saudi Arabia to Pro-Hadi forces
- Houthis − At least 16 were captured from Saudi or Pro-Hadi forces

=== Possible operators ===
- Iran
  - Possibly supplied by Houthis.
