= RPG-1 =

Soviet rocket-propelled grenade launcher

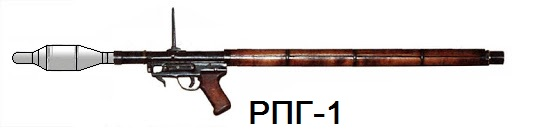
- An RPG-1 launcher with painted round
- Type: Rocket-propelled grenade launcher
- Place of origin: Soviet Union

Service history
- In service: Never

Production history
- Designer: G.P. Lominskiy, Main Artillery Directorate, Small Arms and Mortar Research Range
- Designed: 1944–1948

Specifications
- Mass: 3.6 kg (7.9 lb) total; 2 kg (4.4 lb) launcher; 1.6 kg (3.5 lb) round
- Length: 100 cm (39 in) launcher; 425 mm (16.7 in) round
- Width: 30 mm (1.2 in) launcher; 70 mm (2.8 in) round
- Cartridge: Rocket
- Rate of fire: 4–6 per minute
- Effective firing range: 50 m (160 ft)
- Maximum firing range: 75 m (246 ft)
- Sights: Leaf type

The RPG-1 (Russian: РПГ-1, Ручной противотанковый гранатомёт-1, Ruchnoy Protivotankovy Granatomyot-1; English: Hand-held Anti-tank Grenade Launcher-1) was a Soviet lightweight anti-tank warfare rocket-propelled grenade (RPG) equipped with a shaped charge warhead. The design was inspired by similar weapons being introduced by the US and Germany in the late-World War II period. Work on the design began in 1944 and continued until 1948, but it was not put into production, as the RPG-2 was selected for this role instead. The RPG-1 introduced the basic physical and mechanical layout that was also used on the RPG-2 and the far more famous and ubiquitous RPG-7.

== History ==
In 1944, the Soviets extensively tested new anti-tank weapons, including the German Panzerfaust and Panzerschreck, and the US bazooka. They decided to produce their own design combining the best features of all of these, and began development under G.P. Lominskiy at the Main Artillery Directorate's Small Arms and Mortar Research Range.

Initially named LPG-44, after the program's start date, the weapon was intended to be smaller and lighter than a Panzerfaust, but easily reloadable like a bazooka. Its PG-70 warhead was a high-explosive anti-tank (HEAT) round, named for its size, 70 millimetres (2.8 in) wide at its widest point. Development was largely completed by the end of 1944. The system was renamed RPG-1 and the round became the PG-1.

However, continued testing revealed a series of problems. A major issue was problems in the firing cap, and that the propellant tended to perform inconsistently with temperature changes. The warhead also penetrated considerably less armor than the Panzerfaust, around 140 millimetres (5.5 in) of rolled homogeneous armour (RHA) equivalent. This was too small to fight newer tanks like the Panther. However, it retained Panzerfaust's low velocity, making it accurate only over perhaps 50 metres (160 ft), with a maximum range of only 75 metres (246 ft).

Work continued to try to address these issues, but in 1947, an all-new design emerged that became the RPG-2. This design was clearly superior. RPG-1 work ended in 1948.

== Description ==
The RPG-1 launcher consisted mainly of a 1-metre (3 ft 3 in) long, 30 millimetres (1.2 in) diameter soft steel tube. The rear 3/4 was covered by a thin wooden sheath to protect the operator from the heat of firing. Immediately in front of the sheath was a pistol grip firing trigger, and in front of that, a cocking lever. A leaf sight flipped forward and up from the top of the tube above the trigger. Sighting was done by comparing range markings on the leaf sight against the outermost portion of the round, a solution also used on the Panzerfaust. The launcher empty weight was 2 kilograms (4.4 lb).

The PG-70 was inserted into the muzzle of the launcher and fired using a simple percussion cap firing a 30 millimetres (1.2 in) cartridge. Three ring-shaped stabilising fins were mounted on a tube that extended down the outside of barrel of the launcher, avoiding the need for flip-out fins or other solutions that would fit inside the barrel. The round was 425 millimetres (16.7 in) long and weighed 1.6 kilograms (3.5 lb). It fired at a muzzle velocity of 40 metres per second (130 ft/s) and had a maximum effective range of about 75 metres (246 ft). A trained two-man crew could fire 4 to 6 rounds per minute.
