= Alcotán-100 =

Spanish anti-tank rocket launcher system

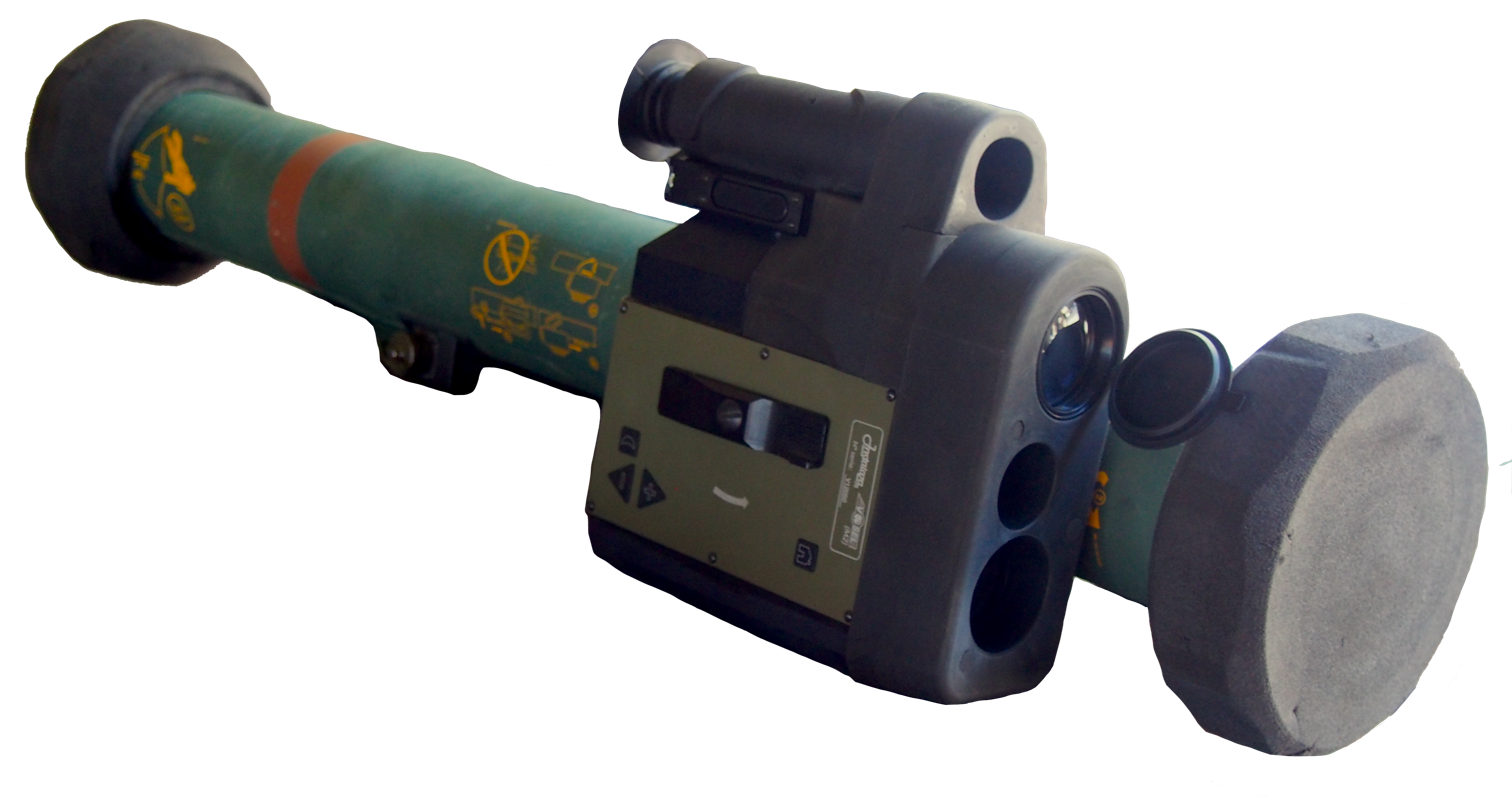
- Single use launcher attached with the reusable VOSEL firing control unit
- Type: Ballistics computer-assisted anti-tank shoulder-launched rocket system
- Place of origin: Spain

Service history
- In service: 2002–present
- Used by: See Users

Production history
- Manufacturer: Instalaza SA
- Unit cost: Approx. $17,500 ~ $24,500
- Produced: 1998–present
- Variants: ALCOTAN-AT (M2) munition: Anti-tank behind ERA; ALCOTAN-BIV (M2) munition: Dual purpose (anti-armour + fragmentation); ALCOTAN-ABK (M2) munition: Anti-bunker ALCOTAN-MP (M2) munition: Multi-purpose, three different modes (impact, impact delay and airburst)

Specifications
- Mass: 14 kg (31 lb)
- Length: 1.15 m (3.8 ft)
- Crew: 1
- Caliber: 100 mm (3.9 in)
- Effective firing range: 600 m (2,000 ft)
- Sights: Telescopic sight with night vision
- Warhead: HEAT; HE/FRAG; HEDP
- Blast yield: 700 mm (28 in) penetration (ERA + armour steel)
- Propellant: Solid-fuel rocket
- Launch platform: Man-portable launcher

Alcotán-100 is a recoilless, one-man portable, single-use (firing control unit is reusable) anti-tank rocket launcher system used by infantry, manufactured by Instalaza. The firing control unit predicts the future aiming point based on calculation before the rocket fire. It is being used as an infantry-type weapon and fireable from confined spaces. Instalaza claiming it to be, "the highest performance in unguided shoulder launched systems". It is in service with the Spanish Armed Forces and exported to other countries.

The ALCOTAN-100 shoulder launched weapon system has been deployed successfully in several conflicts around the World.

== History ==
Production of the Alcotán-100 began in 1998.

== Description ==
The Alcotán-100 fires a 100 mm (3.9 in) HEAT charge, in addition to HE/FRAG and HEDP (dual-purpose) rounds, and the weapon can be fired from confined spaces. The weapon also has a laser range finder and a ballistic computer; this firing control unit must be turned on before the weapon can be operated.

=== VOSEL Fire System ===
The VOSEL fire control unit is available in two different versions, VOSEL (M2) and VOSEL (M2)-IR. The VOSEL (M2) fire system gives the Alcotán-100 (M2) a high hit probability. It incorporates night vision that allows the operator to identify a target up to 1,200 metres in the night, a laser rangefinder with a range up to 2,000 metres and a ballistic computer. After calculating the lead of the moving target, the computer will shows the gunner the future aiming point. The soldier then uses the aiming point to a hit. This mechanism reduces the reaction time and maximize the hit probability.

The VOSEL fire system can be used separately from the launcher tube as a night surveillance telemetric device.

== Specifications ==
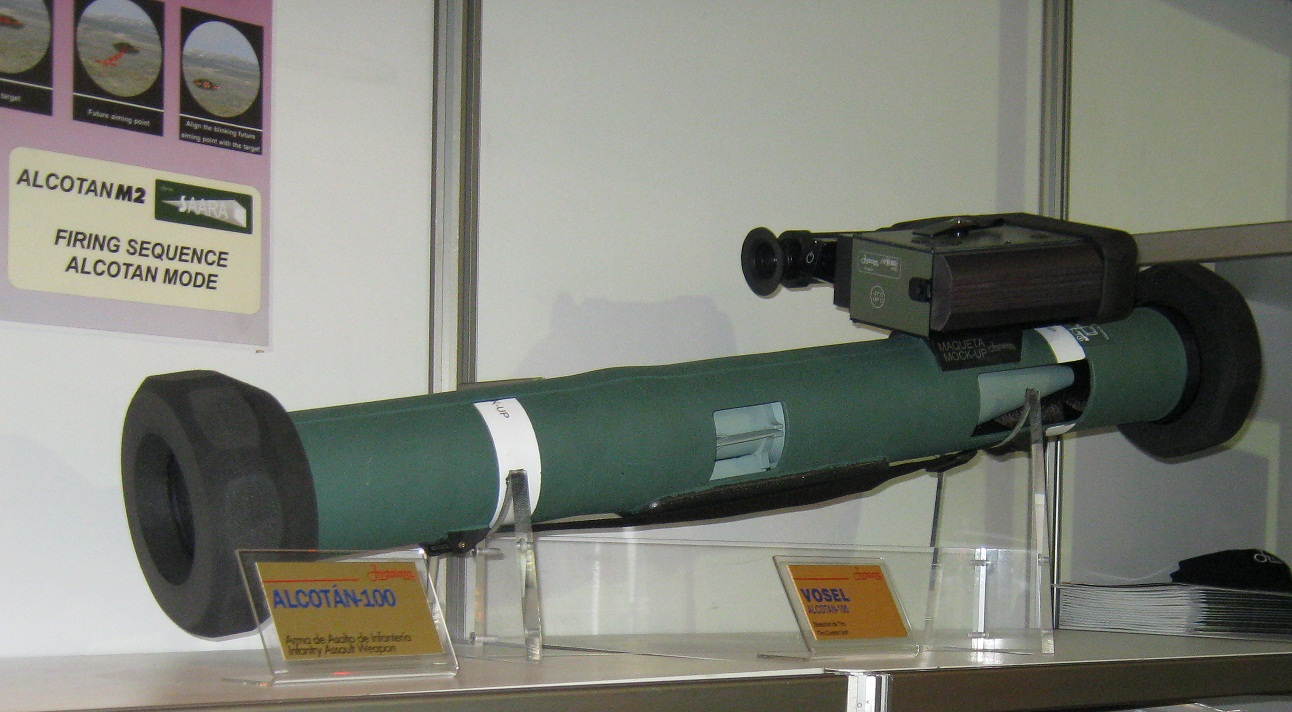
Cutaway model of the Alcotán-100

- Calibre: 100 mm
- Length: 1.15 m
- Weight:
  - Launcher with projectile: 10.5 kg ALCOTAN-AT (M2), 10 kg ALCOTAN-BIV (M2), 9.8 kg ALCOTAN-ABK (M2), 10.3 kg ALCOTAN-MP (M2)
  - Fire system: 4.5 kg
- Range:
  - 30 m to 600 m point target for the ALCOTAN-AT (M2), ALCOTAN-BIV (M2), ALCOTAN-ABK (M2) and ALCOTAN-MP (M2)
  - >1,000 m for ALCOTAN-BIV (M2) (area target) and 1,000 m for ALCOTAN-MP (M2) (airbust)
- Engine: Solid-fuel rocket
- Penetration:
  - Anti-tank ALCOTAN-AT (M2): 700 mm (explosive reactive armour + armour steel)
  - Dual purpose ALCOTAN-BIV (M2): 400 mm (armour steel) along with >1000 fragments
  - Anti-bunker ALCOTAN-ABK (M2): 350 mm (concrete, ∅ >50 mm for 2nd warhead follow-through) along with >2500 fragments inside bunker, 170 mm (armour steel)
  - Multi-purpose ALCOTAN-MP (M2): Effective against light armour and brick walls, >3000 fragments (airbust)

== Users ==
=== Current operators ===
Bahrain

- Bahrain Defence Force

Bangladesh

- Bangladesh Army: ALCOTAN-AT (M2) and ALCOTAN-BIV (M2) along with VOSEL (M2) firing control units.
- Border Guard Bangladesh: ALCOTAN-100 along with VOSEL (M2) firing control units.

Pakistan

- Pakistan Armed Forces

Peru

- Special Forces
- Cavalry and mountain infantry units, with 74 launchers with 660 rockets.

Spain

- Spanish Armed Forces

Ukraine

- Armed Forces of Ukraine.

== See also ==
- List of rocket launchers
