= Dard 120 =

SEP DARD 120
- Type: Rocket Propelled armour-piercing Grenade launcher
- Place of origin: France

Production history
- Designed: 1978
- Manufacturer: Societe Europeenne de Propulsion

Specifications
- Mass: 14.5 kg (32 lb)
- Length: 47 in (120 cm)
- Caliber: 120 mm (4.7 in)
- Maximum firing range: 600 m (2,000 ft)

The DARD 120 is a shoulder-launched rocket launcher of French origin manufactured by Societe Europeenne de Propulsion (SEP).

Work on the new anti-tank grenade launcher started in Societe Europeenne de Propulsion in 1978 year. It had a construction similar to that of the already operational LRAC F1, but with greater intended penetration. The outcome was a grenade Dard 90, also known as AC 1000. It did not have the required penetration, so it was decided to increase the caliber to 95 mm (3.7 in). In 1979, the work was stopped on the AC 1000 and work began on a 120 mm (4.7 in) caliber grenade launcher. The result was presented in the 1981 grenade year Dard 120 (presented at the same time competing launchers APILAS and Jupiter 300 ).

== Overview ==
The DARD 120 was designed in France for use by the infantryman of the French Army. It fires a 4.72 inches (120 mm) projectile at high speed and is a very accurate weapon. Designed for short range use, the DARD 120 has a maximum effective range of 656 yards (600 m).

The DARD 120 uses a split breechblock system. The weapon is made up of two parts, a disposable pre-loaded launch tube clips onto a reusable firing device. The firing device weighs 9.92 pounds (4.50 kg) and is 30 inches (0.76 m) long. The launch tube weighs an additional 22 pounds (10.0 kg) and is 47 inches (1.2 m) long. The DARD fires a 7.27 pounds (3.30 kg) HEAT warhead at 918 ft/s (280 m/s). It is capable of penetrating 33.4 inches (850 mm) of steel armor. With optional night vision sights and an operating temperature range between -22 and 122 degrees Fahrenheit (-30 and 50 degrees Celsius), the DARD is a versatile weapon that can be used in desert as well as arctic conditions.
