= 120 mm M984 extended-range DPICM mortar round =

The 120 mm M984 extended-range DPICM mortar round was developed by the US Army Ordnance. It is a 120mm caliber mortar cluster munition that can carry a variety of payloads including either 54 M80 dual-purpose submunitions or six mines. It can be optionally used with a range extending rocket in a tractor configuration which increases its range from 7.2 to around 12 kilometers.

As the United States has not ratified the Convention on Cluster Munitions, it is still in production.

== Specifications ==
- Length: 940mm
- Weight: 14.9 kg
