= RPG-2 =

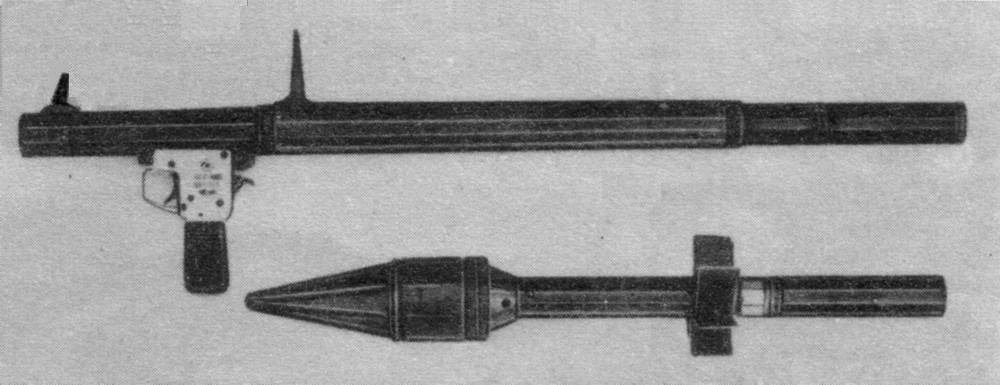
- RPG-2 antitank grenade launcher with PG-2 grenade
- Type: Anti-tank recoilless gun
- Place of origin: Soviet Union

Service history
- In service: 1954–1960 (Soviet Union); 1954–present (other countries)
- Used by: See Users
- Wars: Vietnam War; Laotian Civil War; Cambodian Civil War; Nigerian Civil War; Rhodesian Bush War; Portuguese Colonial War; Moro conflict; Battle of Marawi; Black September; Indonesian invasion of East Timor; Nicaraguan Revolution; Cambodian-Vietnamese War; Sino-Vietnamese War; Lebanese Civil War; Salvadoran Civil War; Thai–Laotian Border War; Somali Civil War; War in Afghanistan (2001–2021); Iraq War; Kivu Conflict; Kosovo war; Syrian Civil War; 2025 Cambodia–Thailand conflict

Production history
- Manufacturer: State factories
- Variants: See Variants

Specifications
- Mass: 2.83 kg (6 lb 4 oz) (unarmed); 4.67 kg (10 lb 5 oz) (ready to fire)
- Length: 1,200 mm (47.2 in)
- Crew: 2 (Grenadier and 'Assistant')
- Shell: PG-2 HEAT round
- Caliber: 40 mm (1.6 in) barrel 82 mm (3.2 in) warhead
- Rate of fire: 3–4 rounds per minute
- Effective firing range: 100–150 m (110–160 yd)
- Maximum firing range: 200 m (220 yd)

The RPG-2 (Russian: РПГ-2, Ручной противотанковый гранатомёт, romanized: Ruchnoy Protivotankovy Granatomyot, lit. 'hand-held antitank grenade launcher') is a man-portable, shoulder-fired anti-tank weapon that was designed in the Soviet Union. It was the first successful anti-tank weapon of its type, being a successor to the earlier and unsuccessful rocket-propelled grenade RPG-1.

The RPG-2 offered better range and armor penetration, making it useful against late and post-World War II tanks, in contrast to the RPG-1 that had only marginal utility. The basic design and layout was further upgraded to produce the ubiquitous RPG-7.

== History ==
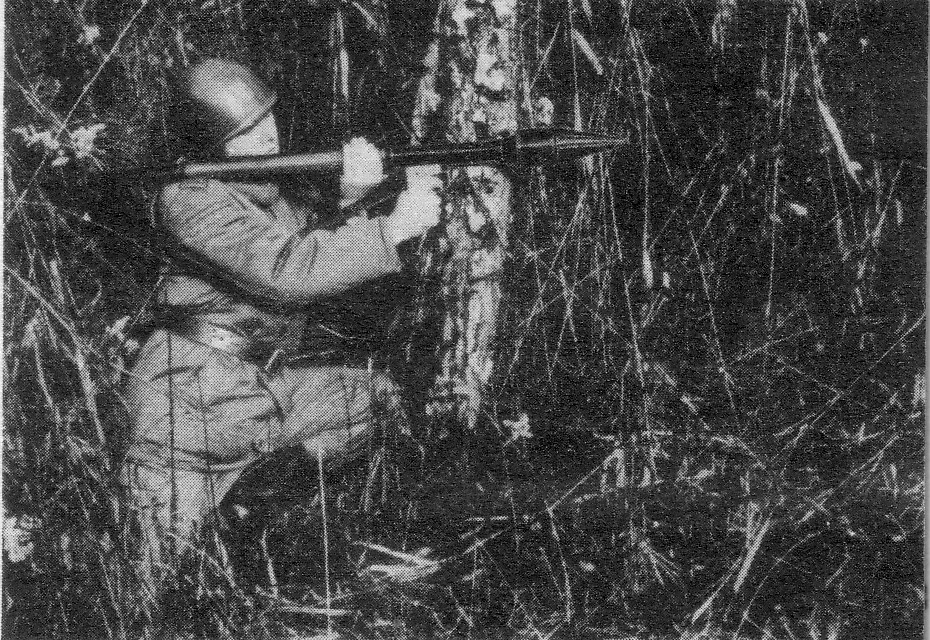
A Polish soldier with an RPG-2 launcher.

Studying German and US anti-tank rocket designs, in 1944 the Soviets developed the RPG-1 with the goal of combining the best features of the German Panzerfaust single shot recoilless weapon with the US Bazooka rocket launcher. Propelled by a 30 mm cartridge, the 70 mm (2.8 in) high-explosive anti-tank (HEAT) shaped charge round could penetrate about 150 mm (5.9 in) of homogeneous armour.

Early testing revealed several minor problems, but, by the time these were being solved, 150 mm of penetration was no longer considered effective against modern tanks, even late-war designs like the Panther. The warhead was already straining the abilities of the cartridge and its range was already considered too low. Modifications to improve this began, but in 1947 the RPG-2 program began as a parallel project. Development of the RPG-2 was carried out by the GSKB-30 design bureau, originally part of the Commissariat for Munitions, but in the post-war period handed to the Ministry of Agriculture to help design farm equipment.

The main difference in performance between the two were due to size. The RPG-2 used a custom designed 40 mm (1.6 in) cartridge to provide much greater power, and the warhead enlarged to 80 mm (3.1 in). This improved penetration to 180 mm (7.1 in), which allowed it to penetrate the frontal armor of all but the very heaviest tanks, and the side and rear armor of any tank. The larger cartridge gave the PG-2 warhead slightly better practical range as well, about 150 m (490 ft) against stationary targets.

The design of the PG-2 differed considerably from that of the PG-1 of the RPG-1. The rear section of the PG-1 consisted of a central tube holding the propelling charge, and a second tube around this carrying the fins. When the round was inserted into the launcher, the second tube was outside the launcher tube, requiring the front of the launcher to be free of any fittings. The PG-2 replaced the fins with small metal leaves attached to the inner tube, and eliminated the outer tube found on the PG-1. This allowed the entire propellant section to be inserted into the launcher, which in turn allowed the sights and trigger assembly to be mounted right at the front of the launcher. This slightly reduced the length compared to the RPG-1, made the entire assembly more robust, and allowed the use of conventional fore-and-aft sights.

The new design was such an improvement on the earlier design that development of the RPG-1 ended in 1948. The first production versions of the RPG-2 entered service with the Soviet Army's infantry squads in 1954. Although the RPG-2 could be operated by one man, standard military practice called for a two-man crew: a grenadier carrying a Stechkin APS, the launcher and a purpose-built backpack containing three grenades and an assistant armed with a rifle and carrying another three-grenade backpack.

In 1957, the launcher was adapted to be able to mount the NSP-2 infrared (IR) night-sight system, which consisted of an IR spotlight and a detector, together weighing (with batteries) 6 kg (13 lb 4 oz). The NSP-2 was usable out to 150–200 metres (490–660 ft) under good conditions. When fitted with the NSP-2, the launcher became known as the RPG-2N.

Widely distributed to allies of the Soviet Union, it was also produced under license by China, North Vietnam and North Korea. Used against the U.S. military in the Vietnam War, its Vietnamese variants were called the B40 ("Bazooka, 40mm") and B50, using the Chinese Type 50 HEAT warhead.

On March 8, 1968, a medevac helicopter was shot down with a B-40 rocket by a Vietnamese soldier during the Vietnam War. On February 20, 1971, UH-1H was shot down with B-40 rocket during the Vietnam War. On June 6, 1970, UH-1C was shot down with B-40 rocket. There were numerous reports of US military helicopters shot down with B-40 during Vietnam war.

== Design ==
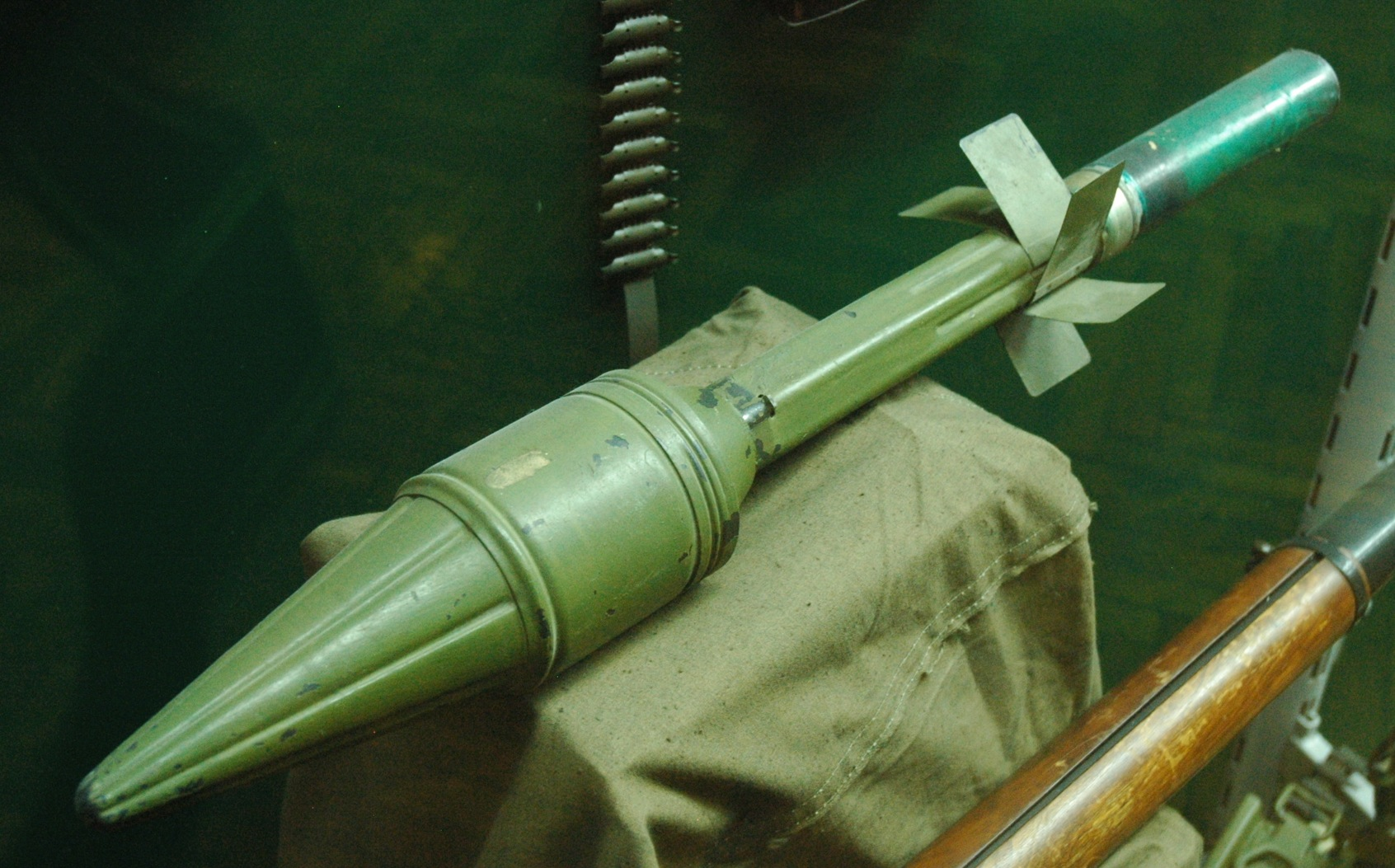
PG-2 high-explosive anti-tank (HEAT) projectile

The RPG-2 anti tank grenade launcher is a simple 40 millimeter steel tube into which the PG-2 grenade is fitted. The tailboom of the grenade inserts into the launcher. The diameter of the PG-2 warhead is 80 mm. The center section of the tube has a thin wooden covering to protect the user from the heat generated by the grenade launch. The wooden covering also makes using the weapon in extreme cold conditions easier.

The total length of the weapon with a grenade fitted is 120 centimeters (47 in) and it weighs 4.48 kilograms (9.9 lb). Only a simple iron sight is provided for aiming.

Only one type of grenade, the PG-2 high-explosive anti-tank (HEAT), was used in the RPG-2. The propellant, consisting of granulated powder, is in a rolled cardboard case treated with wax that has to be attached to the grenade before loading. Once attached to the propellant charge, the grenade is inserted into the smooth-bore launcher from the front. A tab on the body of the grenade indexes in a notch cut in the tube so that the primer in the propelling charge aligns with the firing pin and hammer mechanism.

To fire the RPG-2, the grenadier cocks an external hammer with his thumb, aims, and pulls the trigger to fire. Upon launch, six stabilizer fins unfold from the grenade.

The weapon is accurate, depending on the soldier's experience, against stationary targets up to 150 m (490 ft) and against moving targets at ranges of less than 100 m (330 ft). It has a muzzle velocity of 84 m/s (280 ft/s) and can penetrate armor up to 180 mm (7.1 in) thick.

== Variants ==
- RPG-2N – First introduced in 1957, equipped with a NSP-2 night sight, connected to a battery man pack via cable.
- B40 – North Vietnamese clone of the RPG-2. Rear barrel guard is 50 mm (2.0 in) shorter than the RPG-2/Type 56.
- B50 – Enlarged version of the B40.
- Type 56 – Chinese clone of the RPG-2.
- P-27 – Czech version of the RPG-2.
- RPG-2 clones made by the Moro Islamic Liberation Front
- M57 – Yugoslavian clone. Heavier than the standard RPG-2 and uses different ammunition. Equipped with bipod and optical sight. Uses sand in the propellant system to add mass.

== Users ==
=== Current users ===
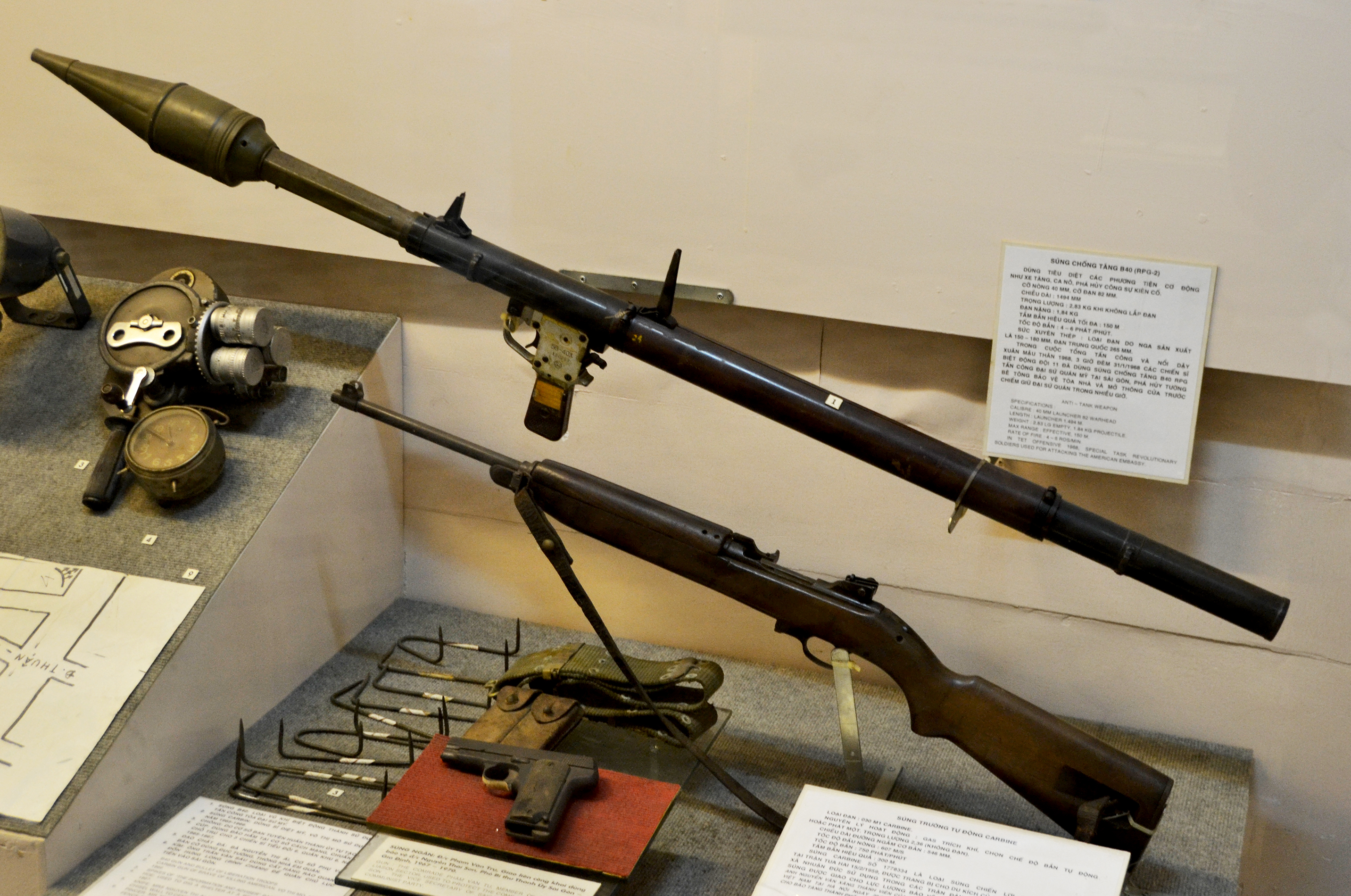
Vietnamese B-40 anti-tank weapon

- Cambodia – B-40 used by Royal Cambodian Army.
- Laos
- North Korea − Locally produced from 1958 to 1959.
- Somalia
  - Somaliland
- Syria
- Thailand − Used in small numbers, mainly by Thahan Phran.

=== Former users ===
- Albania − Type 56
- Angola
- Biafra − Used Type 56s in small numbers
- Bulgaria
- Cambodia
- China − Adopted and produced by the People's Liberation Army (PLA) as the Type 56 RPG; replaced by the newer Type 69 RPG
- Czechoslovakia − P-27 clone
- East Germany
- Egypt − 60 launchers and 3,600 rounds supplied by East Germany between 1967 and 1968
- Georgia
- Grenada
- Guinea
- Hungary
- Indonesia − M57
- Iraq − Type 56
- Laos
- Lesotho
- Libya
- Mali
- Mongolia
- Mozambique − Type 56s were supplied by China during Independence War
- Myanmar − Supposedly used RPG-2s secretly provided by Israel through Singaporean channel from pro-Palestinian guerrilla stock
- North Macedonia
- Poland − Ordered 2,600 P-27s from Czechoslovakia between 1952 and 1955 Also used RPG-2s
- Portugal − A number of units captured from the Angolan, Guinean and Mozambican guerrillas, used mainly by the Portuguese paratroopers, commandos and other special forces
- Romania
- Rhodesia
- Soviet Union
- Ukraine − Several units in storage as of 2008
- United States − Used by MACVSOG recon teams
- Vietnam − Designated as the B-40 in Vietnamese service
- Yugoslavia − Adopted and produced as the M57
- Zaire − M57 Used by Serbian mercenaries of the White Legion
- Zimbabwe

=== Non-state actors ===
- Abu Sayyaf − Used RPG-2/B40s
- Democratic Forces for the Liberation of Rwanda
- Farabundo Martí National Liberation Front
- Moro Islamic Liberation Front − RPG-2 clones
- Moro National Liberation Front
- Mozambique Liberation Front
- NPA
- Taliban
- Ta'ang National Liberation Army
- Viet Cong
- National Democratic Alliance Army
- Kachin Independence Army
- United Wa State Army

== Bibliography ==
- Herf, Jeffrey (3 May 2016). Undeclared Wars with Israel: East Germany and the West German Far Left, 1967–1989. Cambridge University Press. ISBN 978-1-107-08986-0.
- Hogg, Ian V., ed. (1 January 1988). Jane's Infantry Weapons, 1988-89. Jane's Information Group. ISBN 978-0-7106-0857-4.
- Jones, Richard D; Ness, Leland S, eds. (14 January 2010). Jane's Infantry Weapons 2010-2011 (36th ed.). Surrey: Jane's Information Group. ISBN 978-0-7106-2908-1.
- Rottman, Gordon L. (2010). The Rocket Propelled Grenade. Weapon 2. Osprey Publishing. ISBN 978-1-84908-153-5.
