= Northrop Grumman Guardian =

American anti-missile countermeasure system

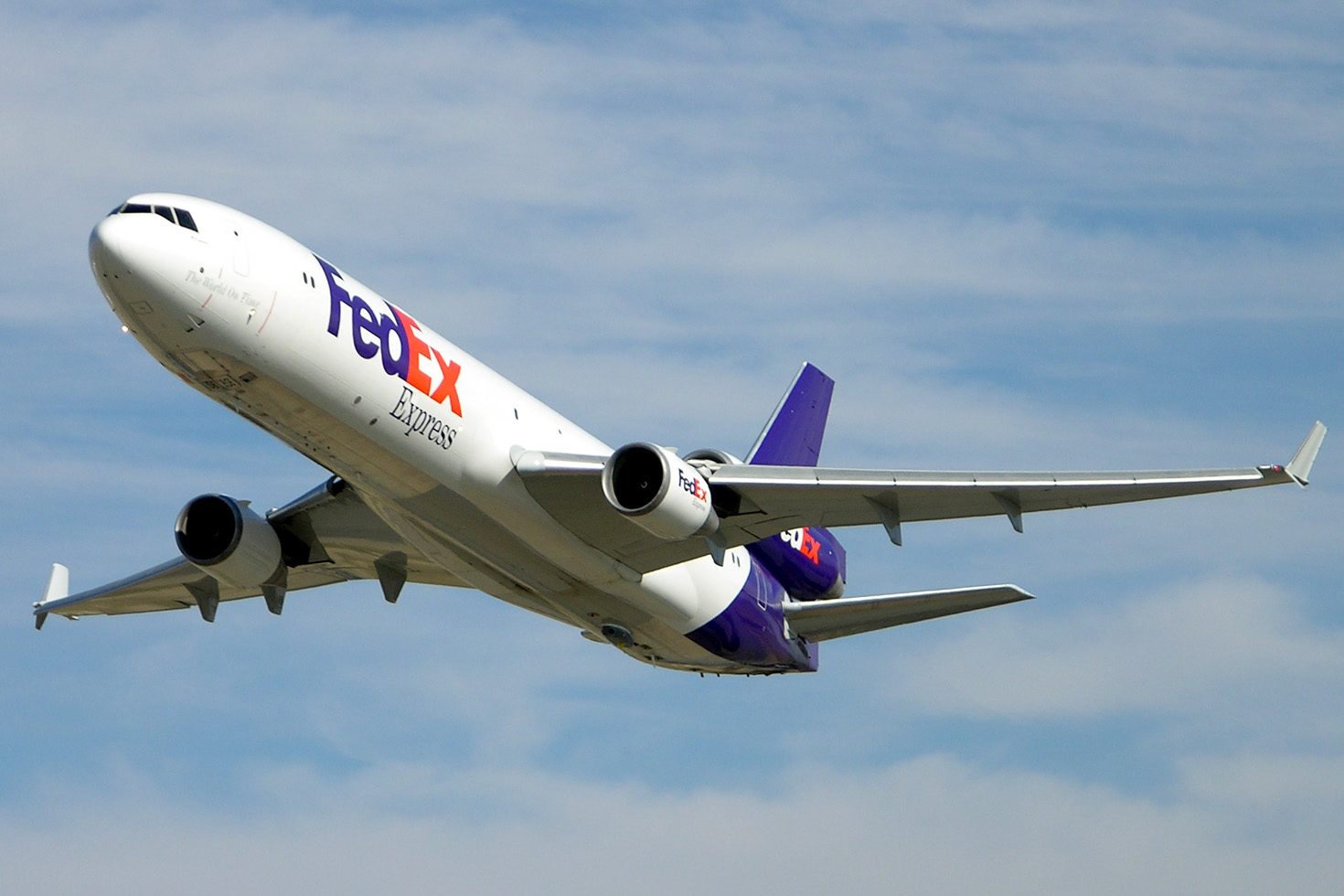
FedEx Express McDonnell Douglas MD-11 during flight test program of the Guardian, which can be seen mounted to the belly aft of the wings.

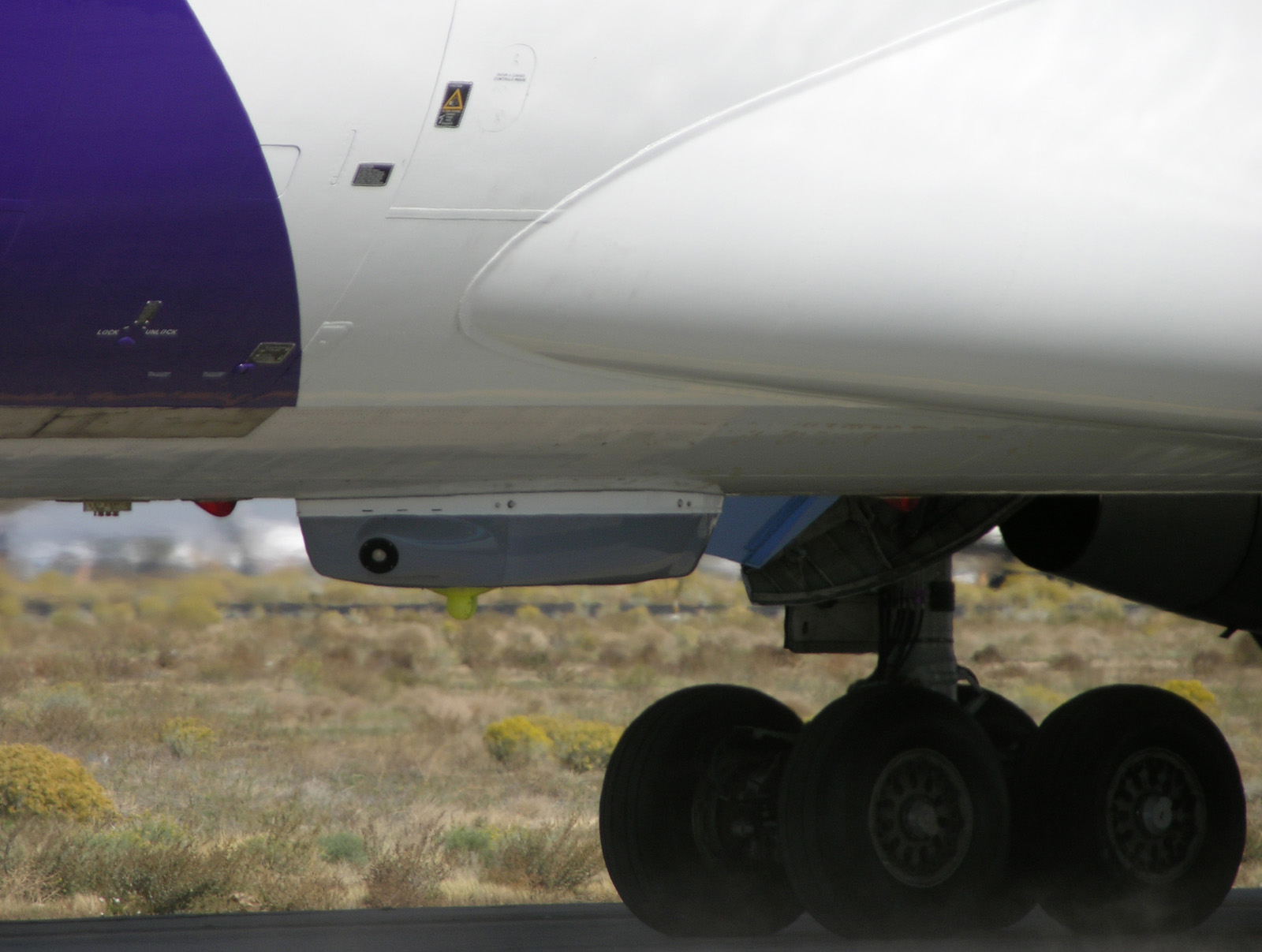
The Guardian pod mounted on the belly of a FedEx Express MD-11 during flight test.

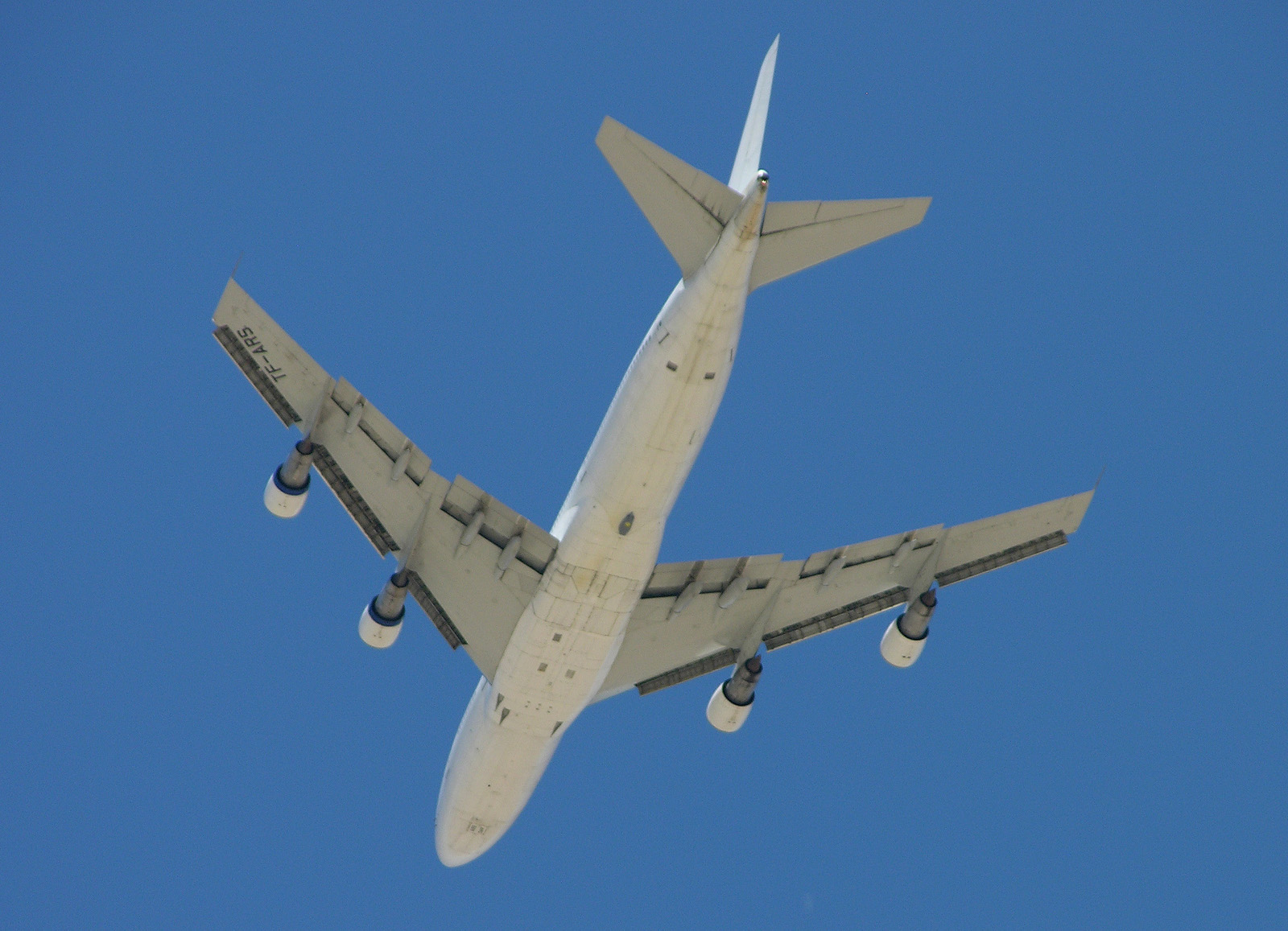
The pod mounted on the belly of an Air Atlanta Europe 747 which was leased by FedEx for the flight tests in May, 2006

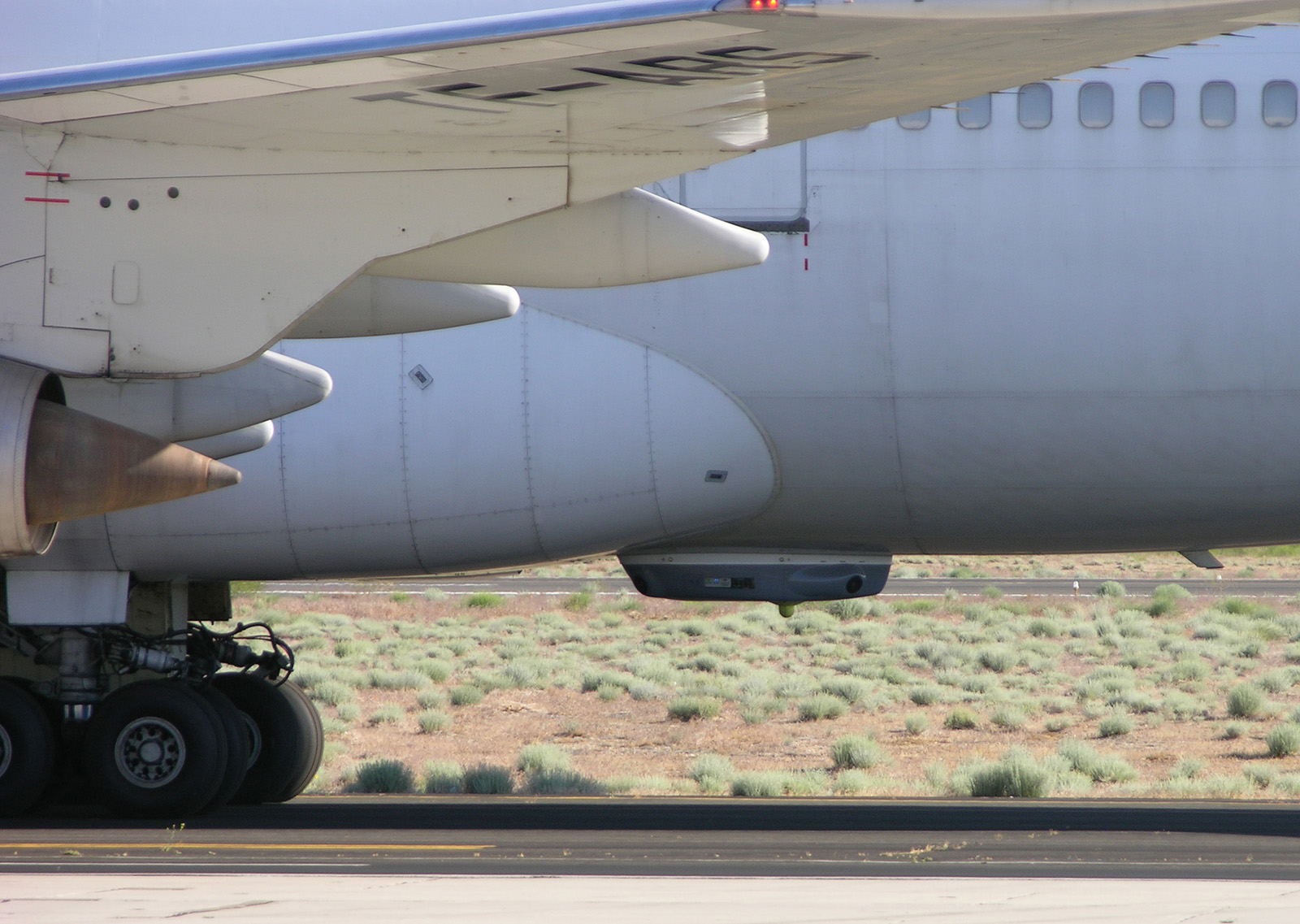
Pod mounted on the 747

The Northrop Grumman Guardian is an aircraft-mounted directed infrared countermeasures (DIRCM) system developed to protect commercial aircraft from infrared-guided shoulder-launched missiles, also known as man-portable air-defense systems (MANPADS). It detects approaching missiles and directs a laser at their seekers to disrupt their guidance.

Guardian was evaluated on FedEx cargo aircraft under the United States Department of Homeland Security’s Counter-MANPADS programme. In April 2008, Flight International reported that Northrop Grumman was dissolving its civilian Guardian team following completion of its Phase III evaluation. By January 2010, the countermeasure systems used in the DHS programme had been removed from the participating commercial aircraft.

== Background ==
The extensive proliferation of MANPADS has resulted in many being available to non-state groups on the international arms black market, sometimes for as little as US$5,000 each. This has resulted in a marked increase of MANPADS attacks on commercial airliners, including the failed 2002 Mombasa airliner attack, the 2003 Baghdad DHL attempted shootdown incident and the 2007 Mogadishu TransAVIAexport Airlines Il-76 crash. According to the U.S. State Department, over 40 civilian aircraft have been hit with MANPADS since 1970, with about 400 passengers and crewmembers killed. Of these, six were airliners.

In 2003, Senator Barbara Boxer (D-CA) and Congressman Steve Israel (D-NY) introduced legislation in both the House and Senate (H.R. 580/S. 311 The Commercial Airline Missile Defense Act) that directed the Department of Homeland Security (DHS) to sponsor a research and development program that would result in a missile defense system that could be installed on commercial airliners; the bill also authorized funding for the program.

As a result, the DHS initiated the "counter-MANDPADS" or "C-MANPADS" program in January, 2004, which tasked several defense contractors to adapt existing military countermeasures systems to commercial usage.

== Description ==
The Guardian incorporates existing infrared countermeasures military technology, adapted from the AN/AAQ-24 Nemesis system, in a commercial package that has been tested and certified by the FAA under a Supplemental Type Certificate for the Boeing 747, McDonnell Douglas DC-10/MD-10 and McDonnell Douglas MD-11.

Guardian is designed to operate autonomously, without input from the flight crew. An array of sensors detects a missile approaching the aircraft and passes this information to an infrared tracking camera. The system's computer analyses the input signals, to confirm that the threat is real, and then directs a beam of an eye-safe infrared laser at the incoming object. The laser is intended to introduce a false target into the missile's guidance system, causing it to turn away from the aircraft. The detect-track-jam process lasts for two to three seconds. The system then automatically notifies the pilot and air traffic control that a threat has been jammed.

The system is wholly contained in an external, 460 mm (18 inch) high pod that weighs 250 kg (550 lb) and is mounted to the underside of the fuselage. The pod is removable, and can be transferred to another aircraft within an hour. The system costs US$1 million per aircraft, and, when ongoing maintenance costs are also considered, Northrop Grumman estimates that the system will cost each passenger an additional dollar in ticket price.

== Development ==
The Guardian was developed under a DHS program. In August, 2005, Northrop Grumman received DHS phase II design approval of the system after it met three main design review criteria.

Also, as a part of Phase II of the DHS program, flight testing began in August, 2005 on a FedEx Express McDonnell Douglas MD-11. Flight tests were then conducted on a Boeing 747 which FedEx leased from Air Atlanta Icelandic. The flight tests were conducted at the Mojave Civilian Aerospace Test Center with the aircraft flying simulated takeoff and landing profiles while being engaged by an electronic system that simulates missile tracking and launch events. The simulator reported tests to be 100% successful.

A civilian version of the system is being developed under the U.S. Department of Homeland Security's Project CHLOE.

The Air National Guard has tested the system on the Boeing KC-135 Stratotanker aircraft.

== Deployment ==
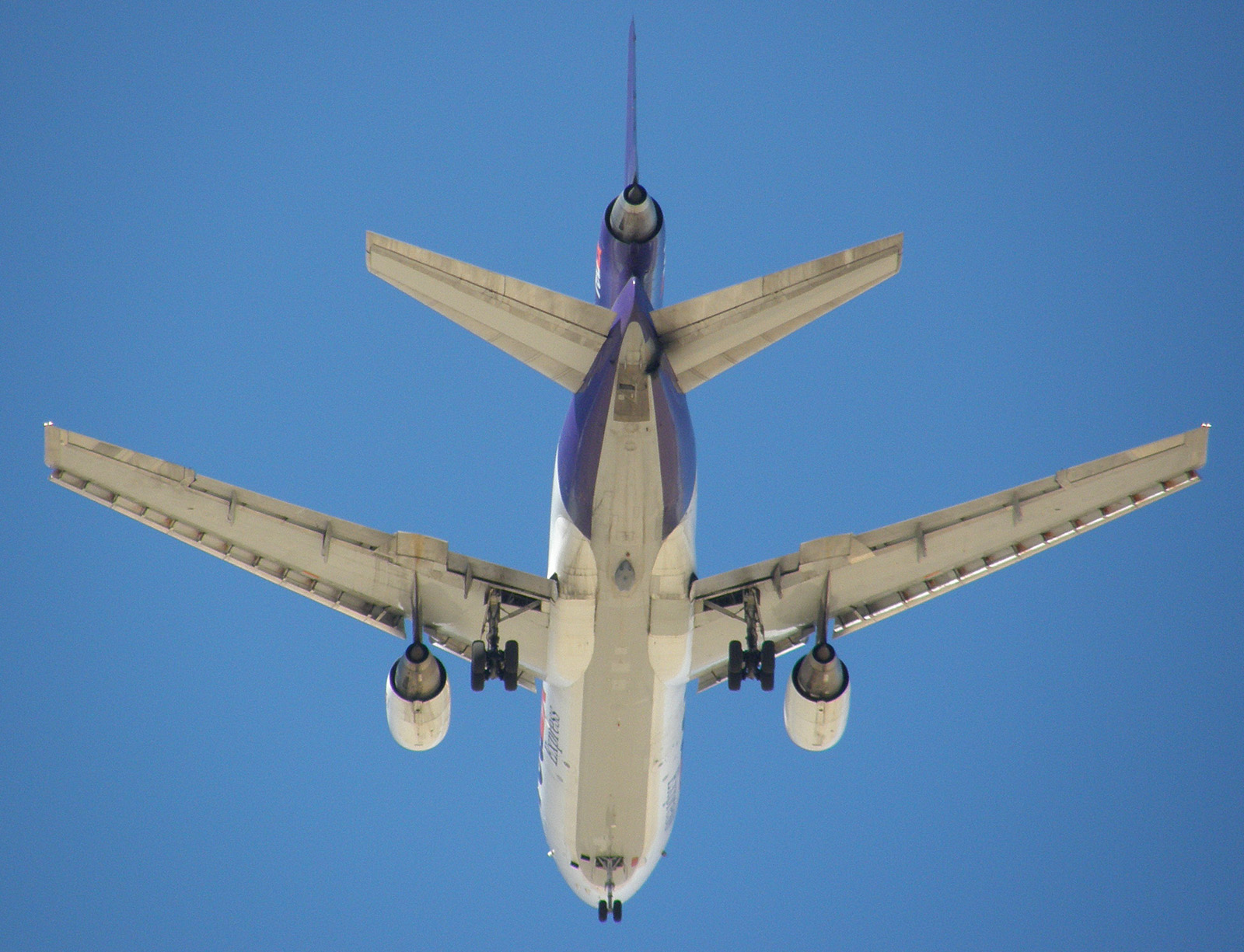
An operational Guardian pod can be seen on the belly of this FedEx Express MD-10 between and just aft of the main landing gear

The third phase of the program, costing US$109 million is the deployment of the system on commercial flights. FedEx Express became the first air carrier to deploy the Guardian on a commercial flight in September 2006, when it equipped one of its MD-11 freighters with the pod, and subsequently equipped eight more aircraft for evaluation purposes.

In view of the initially successful results, Congress directed DHS in October, 2006 to expand the program to include "a service evaluation in the passenger-carrying environment." This will result in 12 commercial airliners to be equipped with the system to gather data on the system's operational impact in regular service.

== See also ==
- 2002 Mombasa attacks – attack was co-ordinated with the shootdown attempt.
- AN/ALQ-144 – Infrared guided missile countermeasure system
- Civil Aircraft Missile Protection System
- Common Infrared Countermeasures program
- Directional Infrared Counter Measures
- Flight Guard
- List of airliner shootdown incidents
