= Project CHLOE =

Project CHLOE is a research and development program of the Department of Homeland Security (DHS) to explore technology-based unmanned aerial vehicle (UAV) mounted defenses for airports and airliners against the threat of infrared man-portable anti-aircraft missiles. The project's name refers to the character Chloe O'Brian on the television show 24, which is Former Homeland Security Secretary Michael Chertoff's favorite show.

== Concept ==
The primary concept being explored by Project CHLOE is to have a UAV circling at 65,000 ft (20,000 m) above a major airport which is equipped for the dual role of detecting and defeating a heat-seeking missile launched against an airliner. Other systems, such as the Northrop Grumman Guardian, CAMPS and Flight Guard have been developed which would be mounted on individual commercial aircraft, but such systems can cost upwards of US$1 million per plane, and airlines would prefer a more workable and affordable solution over using equipment that they have to both pay for and then maintain. The program is the result of a congressional directive to the DHS to explore technology options parallel with the development of aircraft-mounted systems.

The proposed UAVs would have a long loiter time, up to 24 hours per flight, so that there would be a "perpetual orbit", of an aircraft above an airport. The system would have all-weather capabilities to scan a threat envelope of a 3-mile (4.8 km) radius around the airport, and air traffic up to an altitude of 18,000 ft (5,500 m), plus standard approach and departure corridors up to 65 mi (105 km) from airports. The system would be required to respond to a threat within three to ten seconds. It would also have to be unaffected by ground clutter which could mimic the signature of a missile launch. "One of these devices flying above 60,000 ft (18,000 m) would cover all of the commercial airports in the L.A. County area," said Admiral Jay M. Cohen, DHS' technology chief.

== Development ==
=== Program objectives ===
According to DHS literature, there are three objectives to Project CHLOE development. The first is to "investigate and demonstrate the feasibility of persistent stand-off Counter-MANPADS protection". This includes using one or more UAVs stationed over airports which are equipped with both warning systems and countermeasures systems, or using UAVs networked with ground-based countermeasures. The UAVs would be autonomous in their flight and detection operations.

The second objective is to "investigate and demonstrate DHS missions and payloads that are compatible with CHLOE technology platform and operating environment." These secondary roles for the UAVs would include emergency and disaster relief support, support of Customs and Border Protection and Coast Guard for border and maritime surveillance and interdiction, and critical infrastructure monitoring.

The third objective is integrate such technologies into the air traffic control system and other law enforcement agencies for overall situational awareness.

=== Hardware development ===
The development program has a reported budget of US$12.7 million. The countermeasures systems are to be tested on drones operating over the Patuxent River Naval Air Station. DHS has proposed testing on one of several existing UAVs, the RQ-4 Global Hawk, the RQ-9 Reaper or the Altair (NASA's version of the Reaper). DHS also suggested the use of a manned surrogate aircraft, either the Scaled Composites Proteus, a Lockheed ER-2 or a modified Gulfstream G550.

Also included in the study is the means of implementing the system at a number of key U.S. airports, including Denver International Airport, Los Angeles International Airport, San Diego International Airport, McCarran International Airport, Newark Liberty International Airport and Ronald Reagan Washington National Airport.

== Concerns ==
Civilian pilot groups have expressed concern about impact of drone operations in civilian airspace, especially during takeoff and landing. During the actual loitering, the drones will not be a factor to civilian air traffic, since they will be above the national airspace.

DHS is also addressing concerns about the danger to people on the ground from lasers being directed downward, as well as concerns over a falling defeated missile.
