= Chloe (disambiguation) =

Chloe is a feminine given name.

Chloe may also refer to:

== Places ==
- Chloe, West Virginia, an unincorporated community
- 402 Chloë, an asteroid named after the goddess

== Arts, entertainment, and media ==
=== Films ===
- Chloe (1934), short title for Chloe, Love Is Calling You
- Chloé (1996 film), a French television film starring Marion Cotillard
- Chloe (2009 film), an erotic thriller film
- Chloe, Love Is Calling You, a 1934 American film directed by Marshall Neilan

=== Music ===
- Chloe, an album by Willie Nelson
- "Chloe", a song by Grouplove
- "Chloe", a single from Elton John's album The Fox
- "Chloe", a song by Spike Jones
- "Chlo-e (Song of the Swamp)"
- "Chloe (You're the One I Want)", the debut single of American pop rock trio Emblem3 from Nothing to Lose

=== Other arts, entertainment, and media ===
- Chloé (artwork), an 1875 painting by Jules Lefebvre
- Chloe (TV series)
- Fictional characters with the name (see Chloe)
  - Chloe (Hollyoaks), a character from the British series Hollyoaks
  - Chloe, a cat in Unico

== People ==
- Chloë (Australian singer)
- Chloe Bailey (born 1998), American singer known mononymously as Chlöe
- Chloe Lowery (born 1987), American singer known mononymously as Chloe
- Chloé Lukasiak (born 2001), American actress, author, dancer, model and reality television personality

== Weather formations ==
- Hurricane Chloe, in the 1967 Atlantic hurricane season
- Tropical Storm Chloe, in the 1971 Atlantic hurricane season

== Other uses ==
- Chloé, a French luxury fashion house established in 1952
- Project CHLOE, a civilian anti-missile defence system
- Ethinylestradiol/cyproterone acetate, a birth control pill
- Chloe, the brand name of the oral contraceptive co-cyprindiol (cyproterone acetate/ethinylestradiol)
- Chloe, an epithet for the Greek goddess Demeter, meaning the green shoot
- Chloe, DOS software for handling chess problems

== See also ==
- Chole (disambiguation), a disambiguation page
- Cloe, Pennsylvania, an unincorporated community
- "@Chl03k", a song by Modern Baseball (band)
