= Man-portable air-defense system =

Portable surface-to-air missile weapons

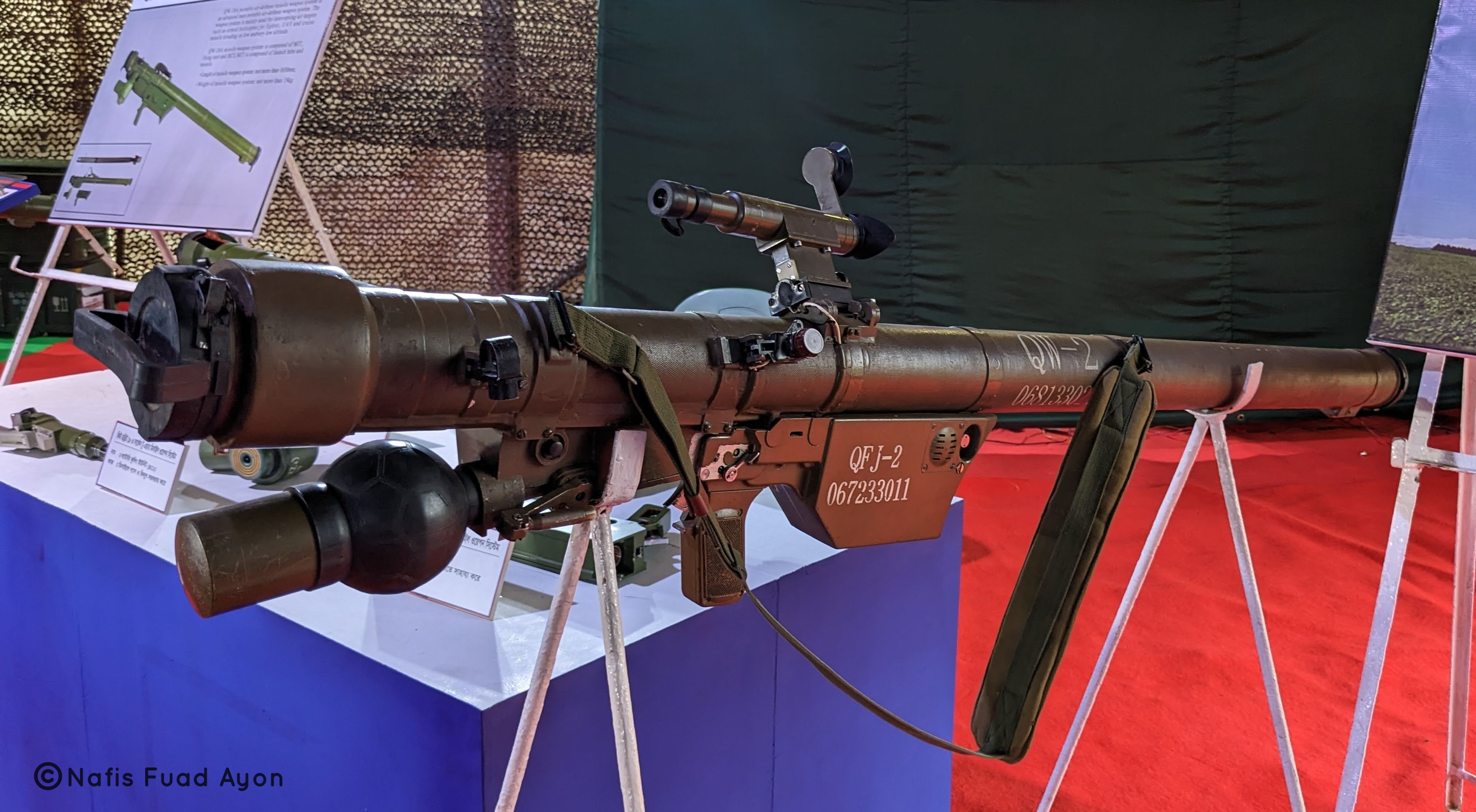
Chinese made QW-2 MANPADS of the Bangladesh Army

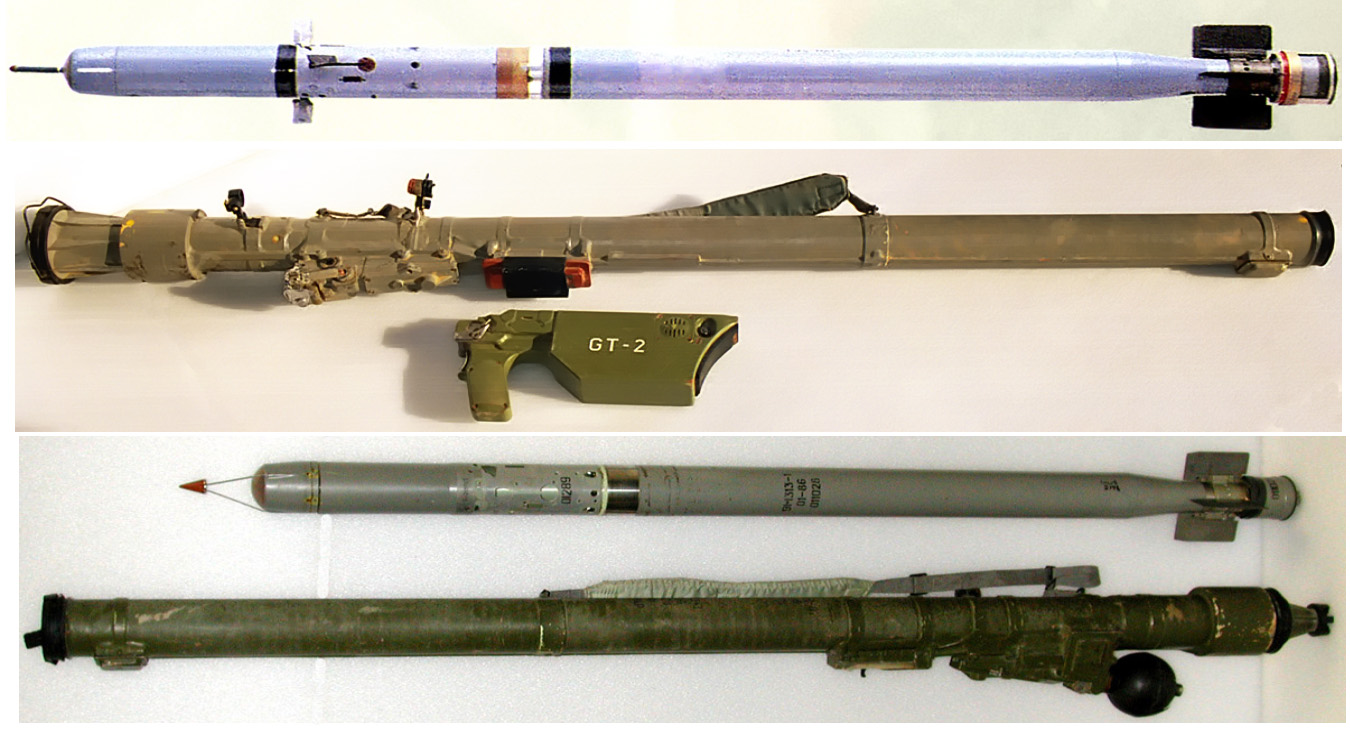
An SA-18 (Igla) missile with launch tube and gripstock (top) and an SA-16 (Igla-1) missile and launch tube (bottom)

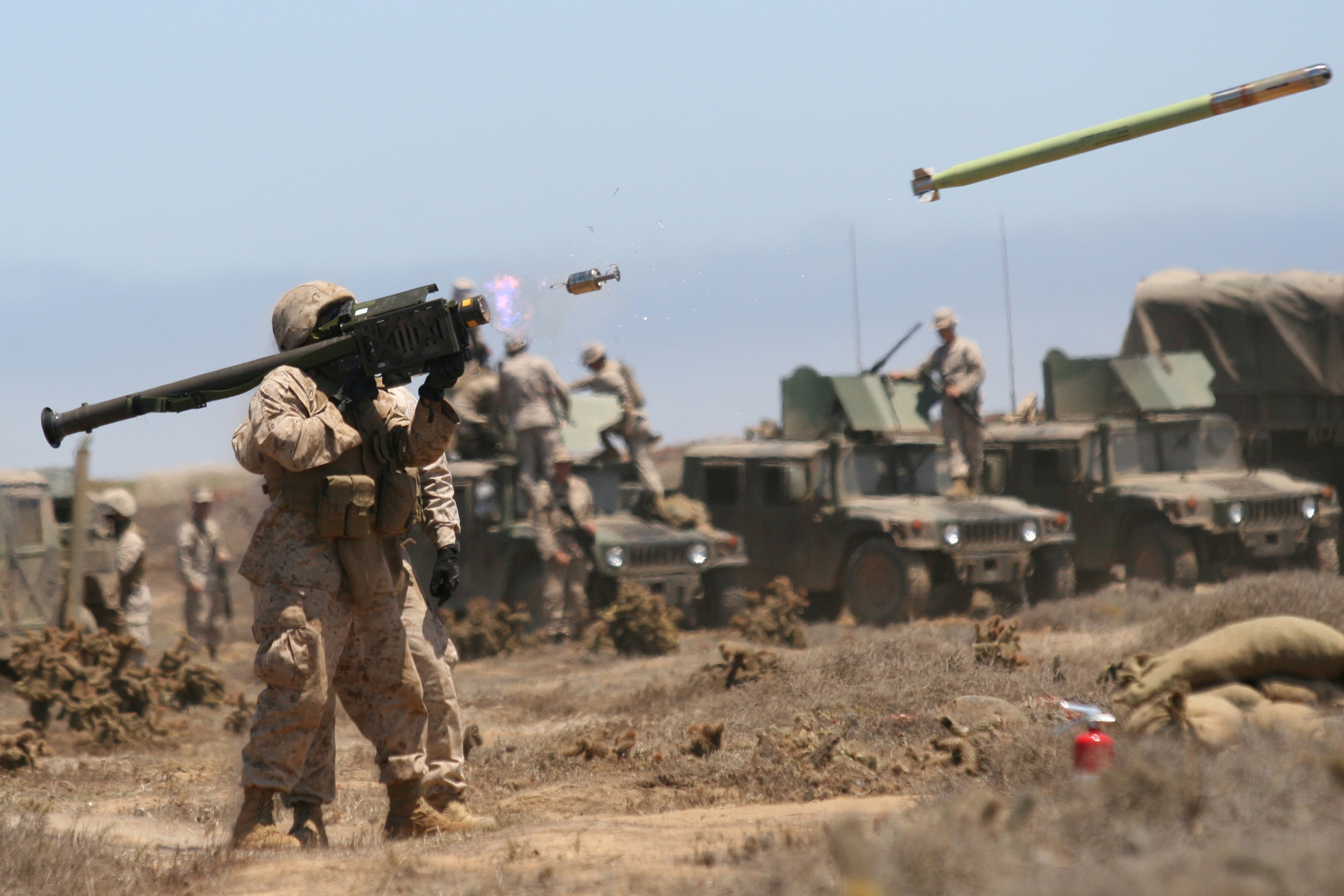
A U.S. Marine fires a FIM-92 Stinger missile during a July 2009 training exercise in California.

Man-portable air-defense systems (MANPADS or MPADS) are portable shoulder-launched surface-to-air missiles. They are guided weapons and are a threat to low-flying aircraft, especially helicopters and also used against low-flying cruise missiles. These short-range missiles can also be fired from vehicles, tripods, weapon platforms, and warships.

== Overview ==
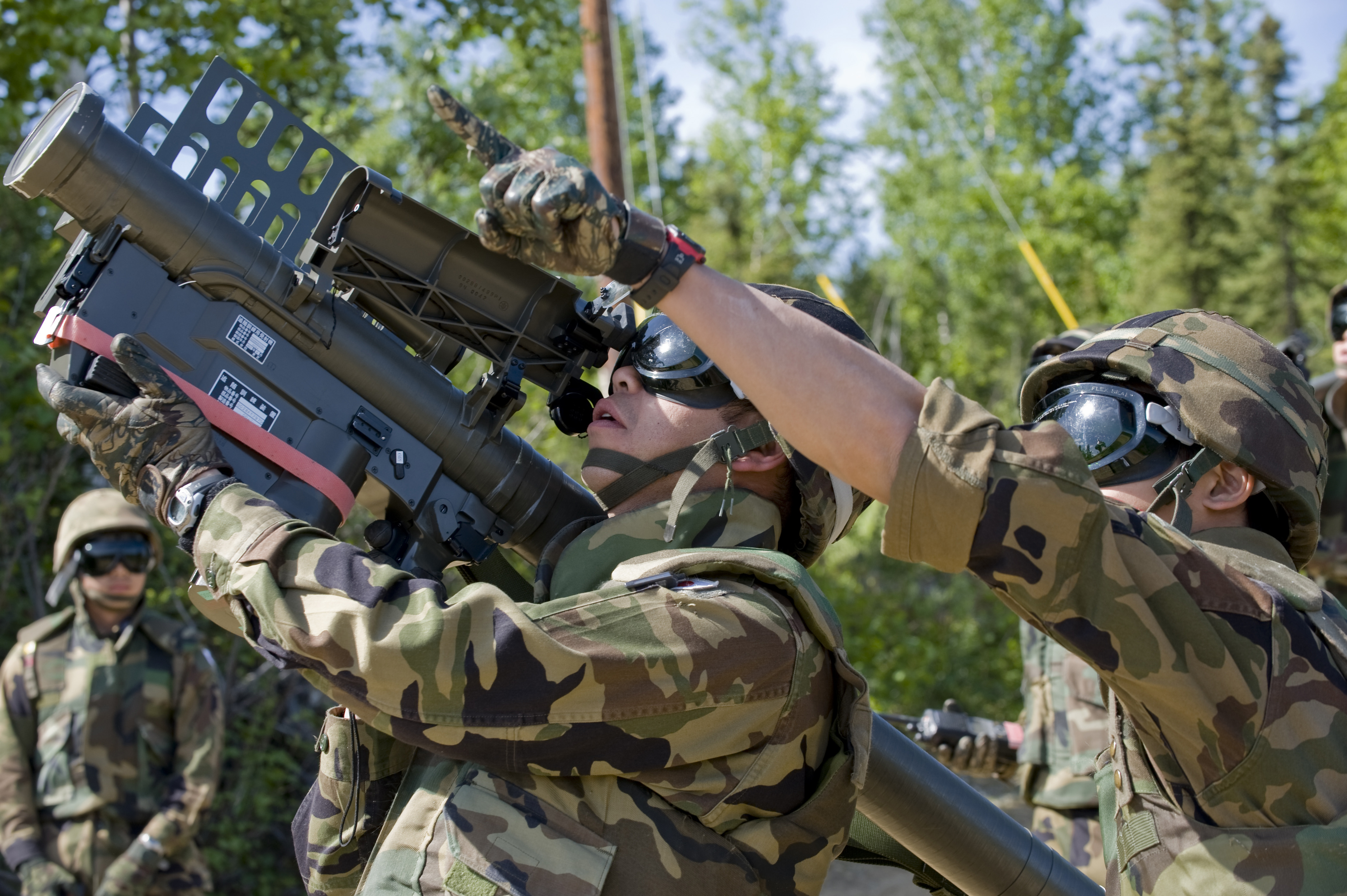
Japanese airmen aiming a Type 91 Kai MANPADS at a mock airborne target in the Pacific Alaskan Range Complex as part of Red Flag – Alaska in 2008.

MANPADS were developed in the 1950s to provide military ground forces with protection from jet aircraft. They have received a great deal of attention, partly because armed terrorist groups have used them against commercial airliners. These missiles, affordable and widely available through a variety of sources, have been used successfully over the past three decades, both in military conflicts, by militant groups, and by terrorist organizations.

Twenty-five countries, including China, Iran, Poland, Russia, Sweden, the United Kingdom and the United States produce man-portable air defense systems. Possession, export, and trafficking of such weapons is tightly controlled due to the threat they pose to civil aviation although such efforts have not always been successful.

The missiles are about 1.5 to 1.8 m (5 to 6 ft) in length and weigh about 17 to 18 kg (37 to 40 lb), depending on the model. MANPADS generally have a target detection range of about 10 km (6 mi) and an engagement range of about 6 km (4 mi); aircraft flying at 6,100 metres (20,000 ft) or higher are relatively safe.

== Missile types ==
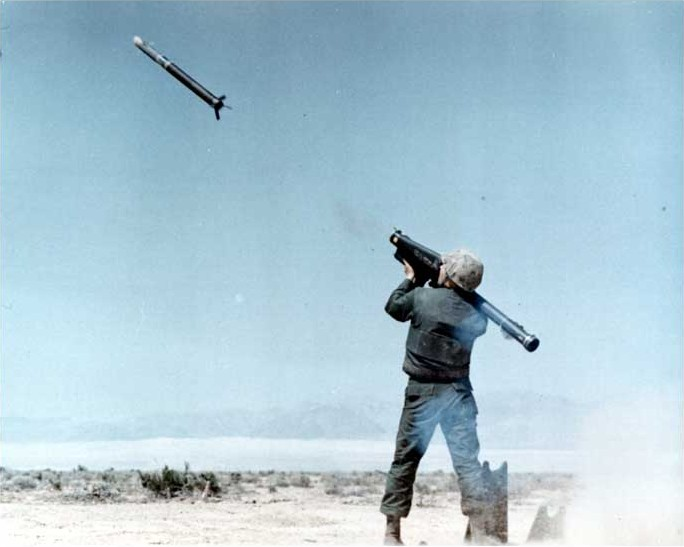
An FIM-43C Redeye missile just after launch, before the sustainer motor ignites

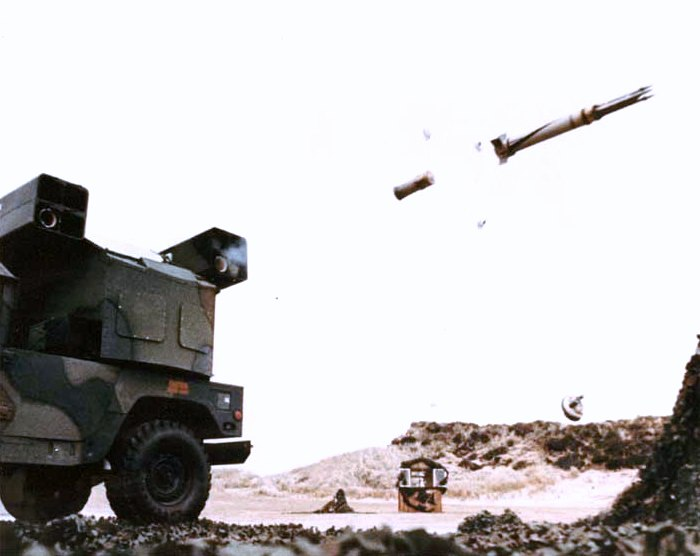
A Starstreak SAM fired from a M1097 AN/TWQ-1 Avenger Air Defense platform.

=== Infrared ===
Infrared homing missiles are designed to home-in on a heat source on an aircraft, typically the engine exhaust plume, and detonate a warhead near the heat source to destroy or otherwise damage the aircraft. These missiles use passive guidance, meaning that they do not emit heat signatures, making them difficult to detect by aircraft employing countermeasure systems.

==== First generation ====
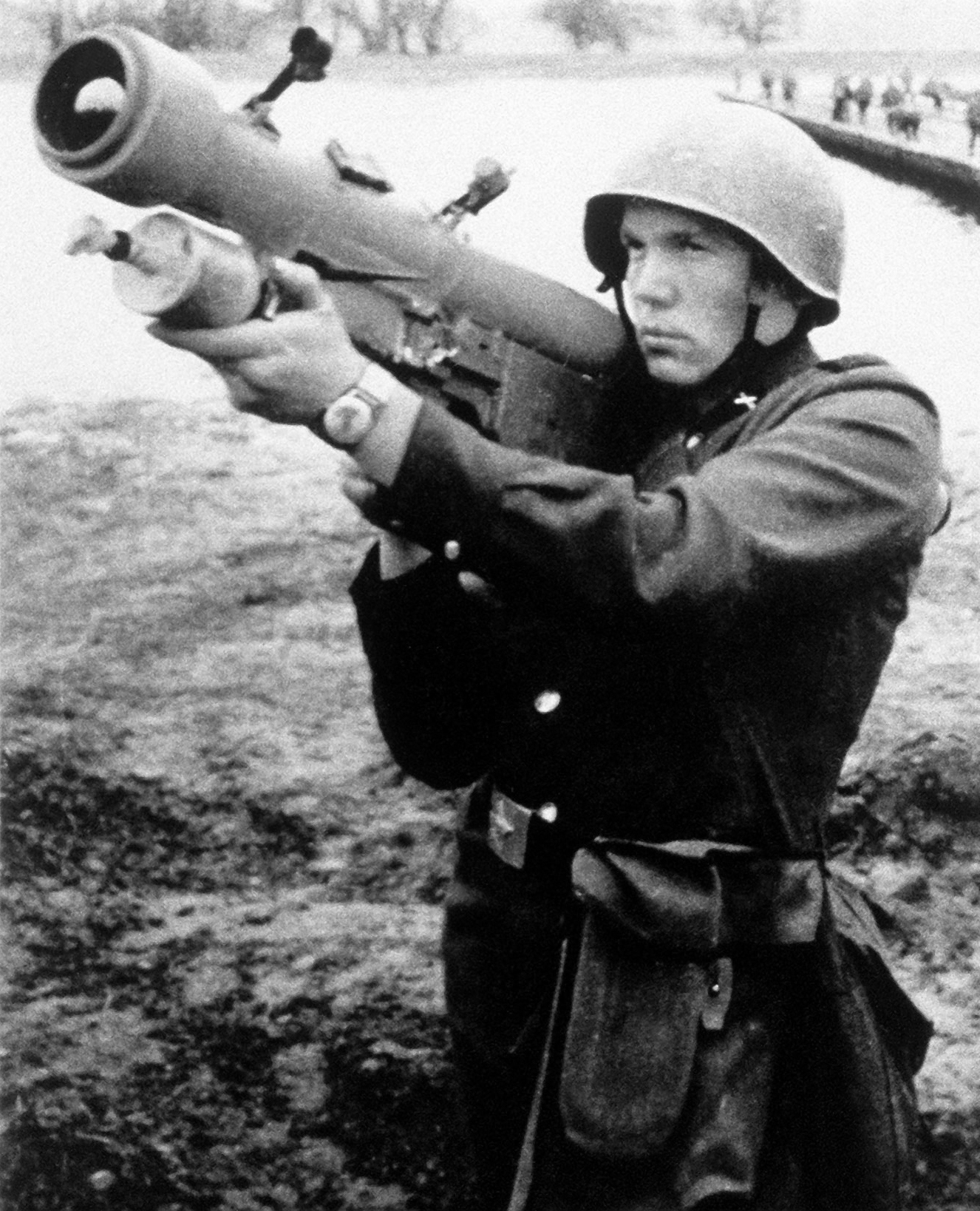
Soviet 9K32 Strela-2 in use

The first missiles deployed in the 1960s were infrared missiles. First generation MANPADS, such as the early prototypes of the American Redeye, early versions of the Soviet 9K32 Strela-2, (Note: The Strela-2M seeker was electrically cooled, similar to early versions of the Redeye, while the 9M32M2 Strela-2M2 used compressed carbon dioxide to provide cryogenic cooling. While the Strela-2M was inferior to the US system, the improvements were enough to justify mass production. As for the Strela-2M2, the Soviet Army decided to adopt the nitrogen-cooled Strela-3 instead, while the former was exported to client states.) and the Chinese HN-5 (A copy of the Soviet Strela-2), are considered "tail-chase weapons" as their uncooled spin-scan seekers can only discern the superheated interior of the target's jet engine from background noise. This means they are only capable of accurately tracking the aircraft from the rear when the engines are fully exposed to the missile's seeker and provide a sufficient thermal signature for engagement. First generation IR missiles are also highly susceptible to interfering thermal signatures from background sources, including the sun, which many experts feel makes them somewhat unreliable, and they are prone to erratic behaviour in the terminal phase of engagement. While less effective than more modern weapons, they remain common in irregular forces as they are not limited by the short shelf-life of gas coolant cartridges used by later systems, requiring only a battery, but the missiles themselves have degraded over the years; For instance, during the Syrian Civil War, the Ahfad al-Rasul Brigades captured 50 Strela-2M missiles (decades past their warranty) from a Syrian Army base in late 2012, but none of them worked.

==== Second generation ====
In 1967, the American FIM-43C Redeye was the first mass-produced design to make use of cooled-detector technology, (Note: Erroneously referred to by Zaloga as the "FIM-92C Redeye".) followed by the Soviet Strela-3 in 1975 and Chinese HN-5A, QW-1 in the late 1980s. They use gas-cooled seeker heads and a conical scanning technique, which enables the seeker to filter out most interfering background IR sources as well as locking on the cooler portions of the jet exhaust plume and other IR-emitting portions of the aircraft, giving them a limited capability of head-on and side engagements.

==== Third generation ====
Third generation infrared MANPADS, such as the Chinese QW-2, and the Soviet 9K38 Igla, uses dual waveband infra-red tracking; while Chinese HN-6B, French Mistral, and the US FIM-92B, use rosette scanning detectors to produce a quasi-image of the target. Their seeker compares input from multiple detection bands, either two widely separated IR bands or IR and UV, giving them much greater ability to discern and reject countermeasures deployed by the target aircraft.

==== Fourth generation ====
Fourth generation missiles, such as the canceled American FIM-92 Stinger Block 2, Russian Verba, Polish Piorun, Chinese QW-4, and Japanese Type 91 surface-to-air missile use imaging infrared focal plane array guidance systems and other advanced sensor systems, which permit engagement at greater ranges.

=== Command line-of-sight ===
Command guidance (CLOS) missiles do not home in on a particular aspect (heat source or radio or radar transmissions) of the targeted aircraft. Instead, the missile operator or gunner visually acquires the target using a magnified optical sight and then uses radio controls to "fly" the missile into the aircraft. One of the benefits of such a missile is that it is virtually immune to flares and other basic countermeasure systems that are designed primarily to defeat IR missiles. The major drawback of CLOS missiles is that they require highly trained and skilled operators. Numerous reports from the Soviet–Afghan War in the 1980s cite Afghan mujahedin as being disappointed with the British-supplied Blowpipe CLOS missile because it was too difficult to learn to use and highly inaccurate, particularly when employed against fast-moving jet aircraft. Given these considerations, many experts believe that CLOS missiles are not as ideally suited for untrained personnel use as IR missiles, which sometimes are referred to as "fire and forget" missiles.

Later versions of CLOS missiles, such as the British Javelin, use a solid-state television camera in lieu of the optical tracker to make the gunner's task easier. The Javelin's manufacturer, Thales Air Defence, claims that their missile is virtually impervious to countermeasures.

=== Laser guided ===
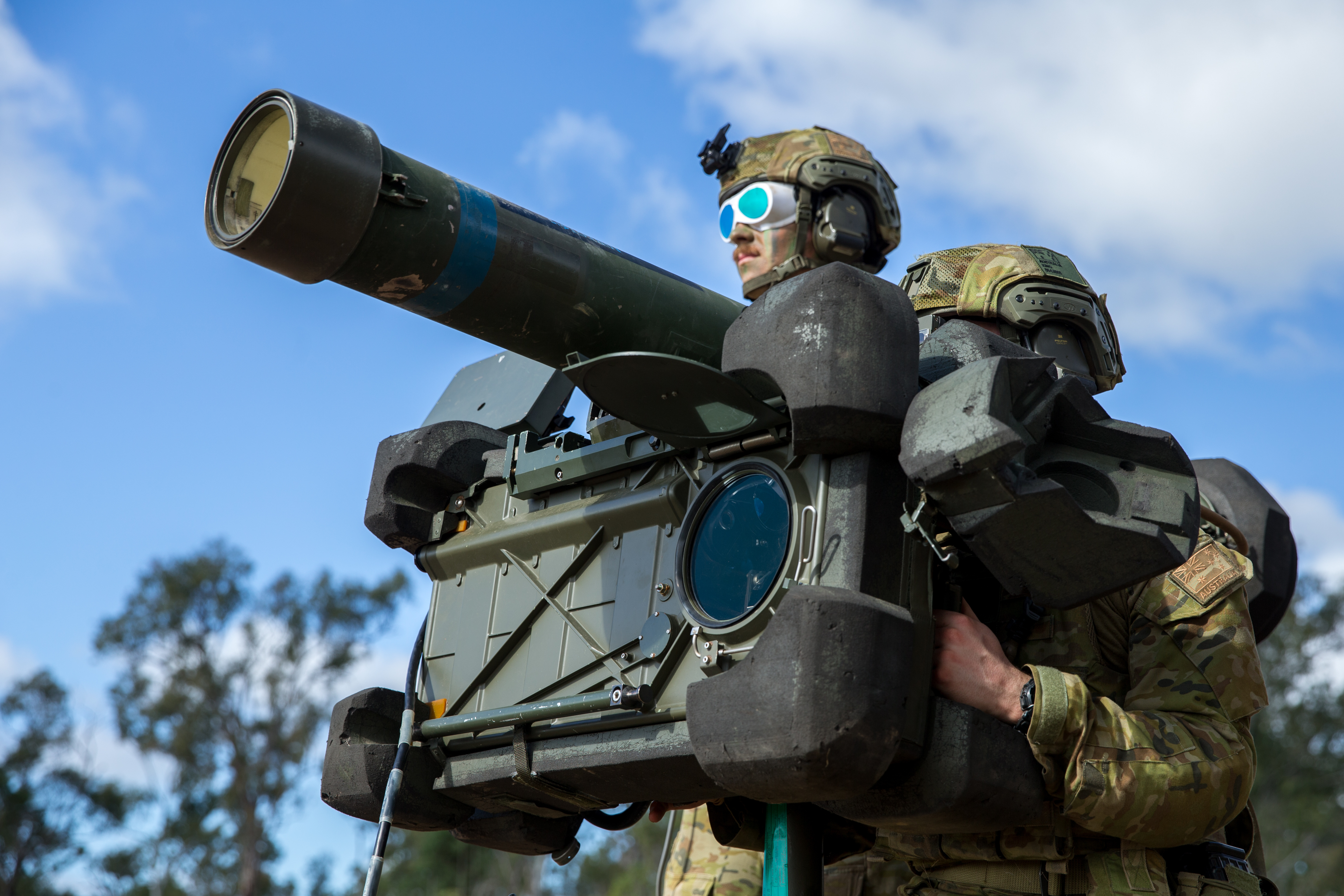
RBS 70 and operators in Australian service, 2021

Laser guided MANPADS can use laser beam-riding guidance where a sensor in the missile's tail detects the emissions from a laser on the launcher and attempts to steer the missile to fly at the exact middle of the beam, or between two beams. Missiles such as Sweden's RBS-70 and Britain's Starstreak can engage aircraft from all angles and only require the operator to continuously track the target using a joystick to keep the laser aim point on the target: the latest version of RBS 70 features a tracking engagement mode where fine aim adjustments of the laser emitter are handled by the launcher itself, with the user only having to make coarse aim corrections. Because there are no radio data links from the ground to the missile, the missile cannot be effectively jammed after it is launched. Even though beam-riding missiles require relatively extensive training and skill to operate, many experts consider these missiles particularly menacing due to the missiles' resistance to most conventional countermeasures in use today.

Another laser guidance method is the semi-active laser (SAL) homing, which the missile seeker head tracks the target that is being continuously painted by the shooter. The QW-3 utilizes a SAL seeker, which is highly resistant to infrared countermeasures. The QW-3 is the only MANPADS in the world using SAL guidance mode.

== Notable uses ==
=== Against military aircraft ===
- List of Soviet aircraft losses during the Soviet–Afghan War
- Falklands War order of battle: Argentine air forces#Casualties and aircraft losses
- Falklands War order of battle: British air forces#Casualties and aircraft losses
- On 27 February 1991, during Operation Desert Storm, an USAF F-16 was shot down by an Igla-1.
- On 1 August 1992, during the Battle of Bahadur Post, Indian forces shot down a Pakistani Lama helicopter, carrying the local commanding officer Brigadier Masood Anwari, was struck, killing him and two others.
- On 16 April 1994, during Operation Deny Flight a Sea Harrier of the 801 Naval Air Squadron of the Royal Navy, operating from the aircraft carrier HMS Ark Royal, was brought down by an Igla-1.
- On 30 August 1995, during Operation Deliberate Force, a French Air Force Mirage 2000D was shot down over Bosnia by a heat-seeking 9K38 Igla missile fired by air defense units of Army of Republika Srpska, prompting efforts to obtain improved defensive systems.
- On 27 May 1999, the Pakistani Army Air Defence corps used Anza Mk-II was used to attack Indian attack aircraft during Operation Safed Sagar.The missile aided to shoot down an MiG-27 of the Indian Air Force that suffered a subsequent flameout of its engines and the Pilot, Kambampati Nachiketa was captured. An FIM-92 Stinger was also used to shoot down an Indian MiG-21, piloted by Ajay Ahuja the following day.
- List of Russian aircraft losses in the Second Chechen War
- List of Coalition aircraft crashes in Afghanistan
- List of aviation shootdowns and accidents during the Iraq War
- 2002 Khankala Mi-26 crash: On 19 August 2002, a Russian-made Igla shoulder-fired surface-to-air missile hit an overloaded Mil Mi-26 helicopter, causing it to crash into a minefield at the main military base at Khankala near the capital city of Grozny, Chechnya. 127 Russian troops and crew were killed.
- In the 2008 South Ossetia War, Polish made PZR Grom MANPADS were used by Georgia.
- Syrian Civil War
  - On 3 February 2018, a Russian Sukhoi Su-25 piloted by Major Roman Filipov was shot down by a MANPADS over rebel-held territory while conducting airstrikes over Syria's northwestern city of Saraqib.
- War in Donbas
- Russo-Ukrainian war (2022–present)

=== Against civilian aircraft ===
- Air Rhodesia Flight 825 is the first example of a civilian airliner shot down by a man-portable surface-to-air missile. The pilot of the aircraft managed to make a controlled crash landing.
- Air Rhodesia Flight 827 was also shot down in February 1979 by the Zimbabwe People's Revolutionary Army with a Strela 2 missile. All 59 passengers and crew were killed.
- The 1993 Sukhumi airliner attacks involved 5 civilian aircraft shot down within a total of 4 days in Sukhumi, Abkhazia, Georgia, killing 108 people.
- On 6 April 1994, a surface-to-air missile struck the wing of a Dassault Falcon 50 as it prepared to land in Kigali, Rwanda. A second missile hit its tail. Rwandan president Juvénal Habyarimana and Burundian president Cyprien Ntaryamira were among the nine passengers on board. The plane erupted into flames in mid-air before crashing into the garden of the presidential palace, exploding on impact. This incident was the ignition spark of the Rwandan genocide.
- 1998 Lionair Flight LN 602 shootdown: On 7 October 1998, the Tamil Tigers shot down an aircraft off the coast of Sri Lanka.
- 2002 Mombasa airliner attack: On 28 November 2002, two shoulder-launched Strela 2 (SA-7) surface-to-air missiles were fired at a chartered Boeing 757 airliner as it took off from Moi International Airport. The missiles missed the aircraft which continued safely to Tel Aviv, carrying 271 vacationers from Mombasa back to Israel. In photos, the missile systems were painted in light blue, the color used in the Soviet military for training material (a training SA-7 round would not have the guidance system).
- 2003 Baghdad DHL attempted shootdown incident: On 22 November 2003, an Airbus A300B4-203F cargo plane, operating on behalf of DHL was hit by an SA-14 missile, which resulted in the loss of its hydraulic systems. The crew later landed the crippled aircraft safely by using only differential engine thrust by adjusting the individual throttle controls of each engine.
- 2007 Mogadishu TransAVIAexport Airlines Il-76 crash: On 23 March 2007, a TransAVIAexport Airlines Ilyushin Il-76 airplane crashed in the outskirts of Mogadishu, Somalia, during the 2007 Battle of Mogadishu. Witnesses claim that a surface-to-air missile was fired immediately prior to the accident. However, Somali officials deny that the aircraft was shot down.

Over fifty MANPADS attacks on civilian aircraft are on record to 2007. Thirty-three aircraft were shot down killing over 800 people in the process.

=== Against cruise missiles ===
During the Iran–Iraq War, an Iranian Strela-2M MANPADS was reportedly used to shoot down an Iraqi P-15 Termit (SS-N-2 Styx) anti-ship missile fired against an oil platform.

On 10 October 2022, during the Russo-Ukrainian war, Ukrainian forces were recorded allegedly shooting down a Russian cruise missile using MANPADS. In 2025, Ukraine used a FN-6 missile to shoot down a Russian 3M-54 Kalibr missile with video and photo records.

== Countermeasures ==
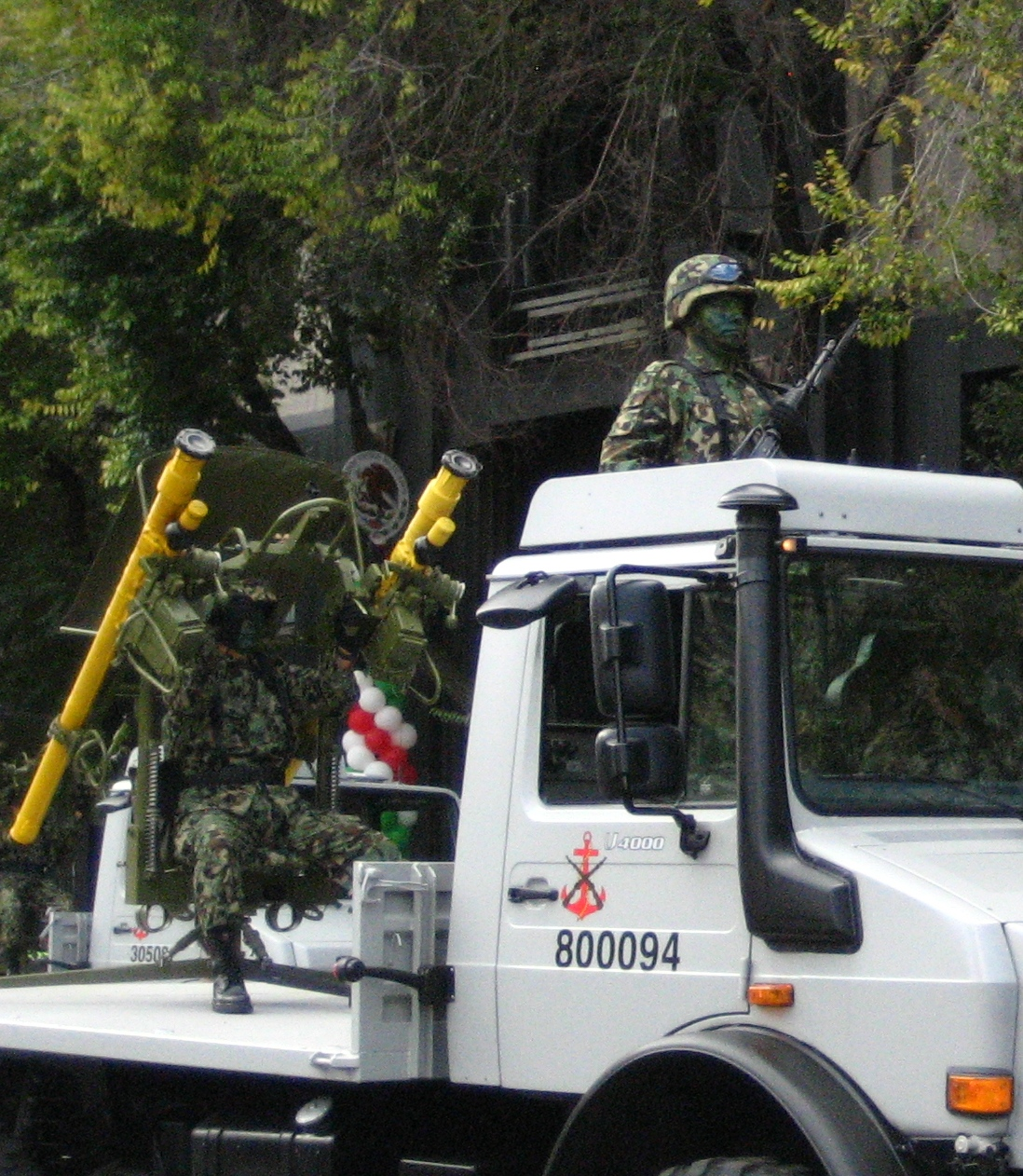
A 9K38 Igla (NATO reporting name: SA-18) dual missile launch platform mounted on a Mercedes-Benz Unimog of the Mexican Navy in a Mexican military parade.

Man-portable air defense systems are a popular black market item for insurgent forces. Their proliferation became the subject of the Wassenaar Arrangement's (WA)22 Elements for Export Controls of MANPADS, the G8 Action Plan of 2 June 2003, the October 2003 Asia-Pacific Economic Cooperation (APEC) Summit, Bangkok Declaration on Partnership for the Future and in July 2003 the Organization for Security and Co-operation in Europe (OSCE), Forum for Security Co-operation, Decision No. 7/03: Man-portable Air Defense Systems.

Understanding the problem in 2003, Colin Powell remarked that there was "no threat more serious to aviation" than the missiles, which can be used to shoot down helicopters and commercial airliners, and are sold illegally for as little as a few hundred dollars. The U.S. has led a global effort to dismantle these weapons, with over 30,000 voluntarily destroyed since 2003, but probably thousands are still in the hands of insurgents, especially in Iraq, where they were looted from the military arsenals of the former dictator Saddam Hussein, and in Afghanistan as well. In August 2010, a report by the Federation of American Scientists (FAS) confirmed that "only a handful" of illicit MANPADS were recovered from national resistance caches in Iraq in 2009, according to media reports and interviews with military sources.

=== Military ===
With the growing number of MANPADS attacks on civilian airliners, a number of different countermeasure systems have been developed specifically to protect aircraft against the missiles.

- AN/ALQ-144, AN/ALQ-147 and AN/ALQ-157 are U.S.-produced systems, developed by Sanders Associates in the 1970s.
- AN/ALQ-212 ATIRCM, AN/AAQ-24 Nemesis are NATO systems developed by BAE Systems and Northrop Grumman respectively.

=== Civilian ===
- Civil Aircraft Missile Protection System (CAMPS)—Developed by Saab Avitronics, Chemring Countermeasures and Naturelink Aviation, using non-pyrotechnic infrared decoy

== Weapons by manufacturing country ==
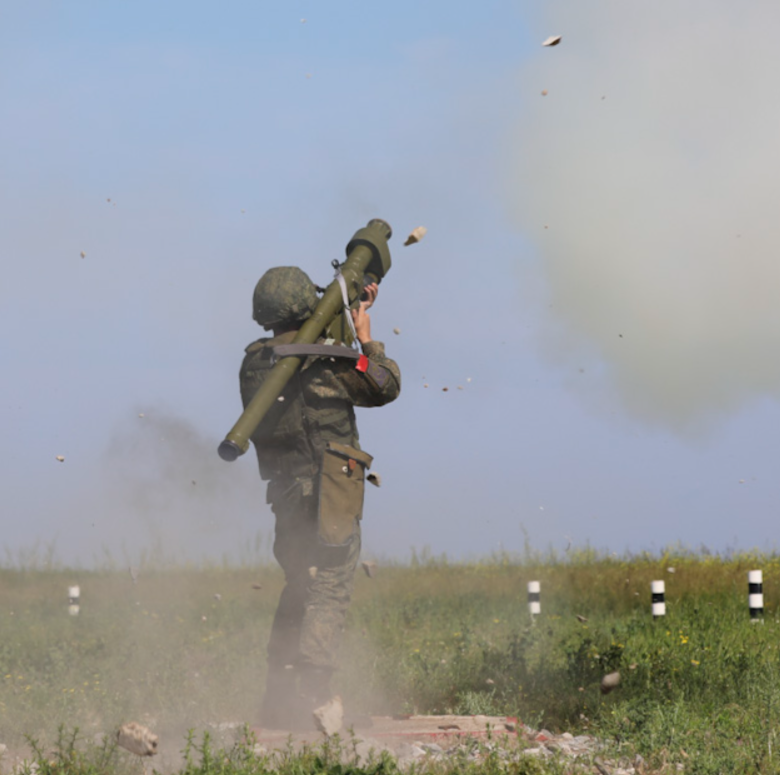
Practice shooting from MANPADS

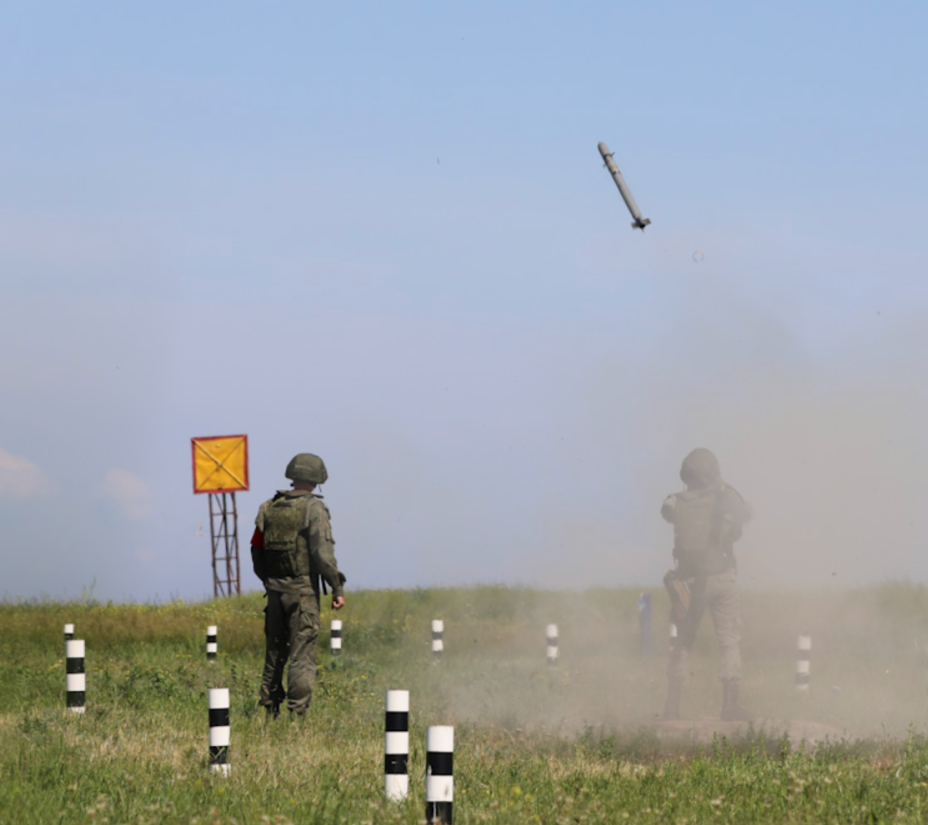
Departure of a rocket from MANPADS

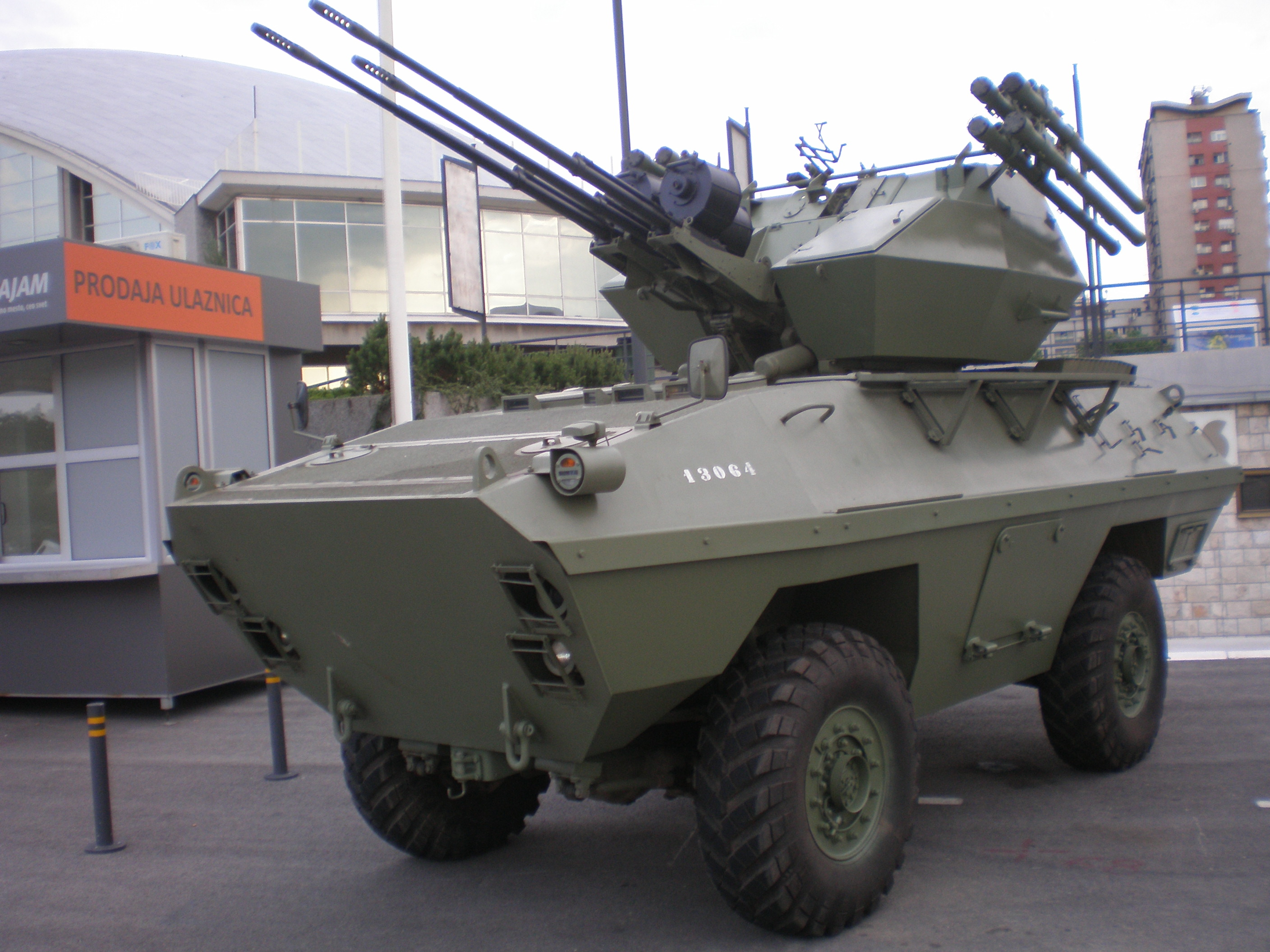
HS M09 hybrid air-defense system on BOV-3 vehicle with 8 × Strela 2

- China
  - HN-5
  - HN-6 (FN-6)
  - HN-6B (FN-16)
  - FN-M
  - QW-1 (QW-1A, QW-1M, QW-11, QW-11G)
  - QW-2
  - QW-3
  - QW-4
  - QN-202
- France
  - Mistral 1
  - Mistral 2
  - Mistral 3
- United Kingdom
  - Blowpipe
  - Javelin
  - Lightweight Multirole Missile
  - Starburst
  - Starstreak
- India
  - MPDMS
  - VSHORAD
- Iran
  - Misagh-1
  - Misagh-2
  - Misagh-3
  - Qaem
- Italy
  - Fulgur
- Japan
  - Type 91 (SAM-2, SAM-2B)
- Pakistan
  - Anza
- Poland
  - PZR Grom
  - Piorun
- Romania
  - CA-94:
    - CA-94M
- Soviet Union/Russian Federation
  - 9K32M 'Strela-2' (SA-7)
  - 9K36 'Strela-3' (SA-14)
  - 9K310 'Igla-M' (SA-16)
  - 9K38 'Igla' (SA-18)
  - 9K338 ' Igla-S' (SA-24)
  - 9K333 'Verba' (SA-25)
- Sweden
  - RBS 70
    - RBS 70 NG
- United States
  - FIM-43 'Redeye'
  - FIM-92 'Stinger'
- South Korea
  - Chiron
- North Korea
  - HT-16PGJ
- Turkey
  - Sungur

=== Black market ===
Although most MANPADS are owned and accounted for by governments, political upheavals and corruption have allowed thousands of them to enter the black market. In the years 1998–2018, at least 72 non-state groups have fielded MANPADS. Civilians in the United States cannot legally own MANPADS.

== See also ==
- Anti-aircraft warfare
- Infrared countermeasure
- Aerial countermeasures
- Civil Aircraft Missile Protection System
- Flight Guard
- Northrop Grumman Guardian
- Man-portable anti-tank systems
