= Directional Infrared Counter Measures =

System to protect aircraft from heat seeking portable missiles

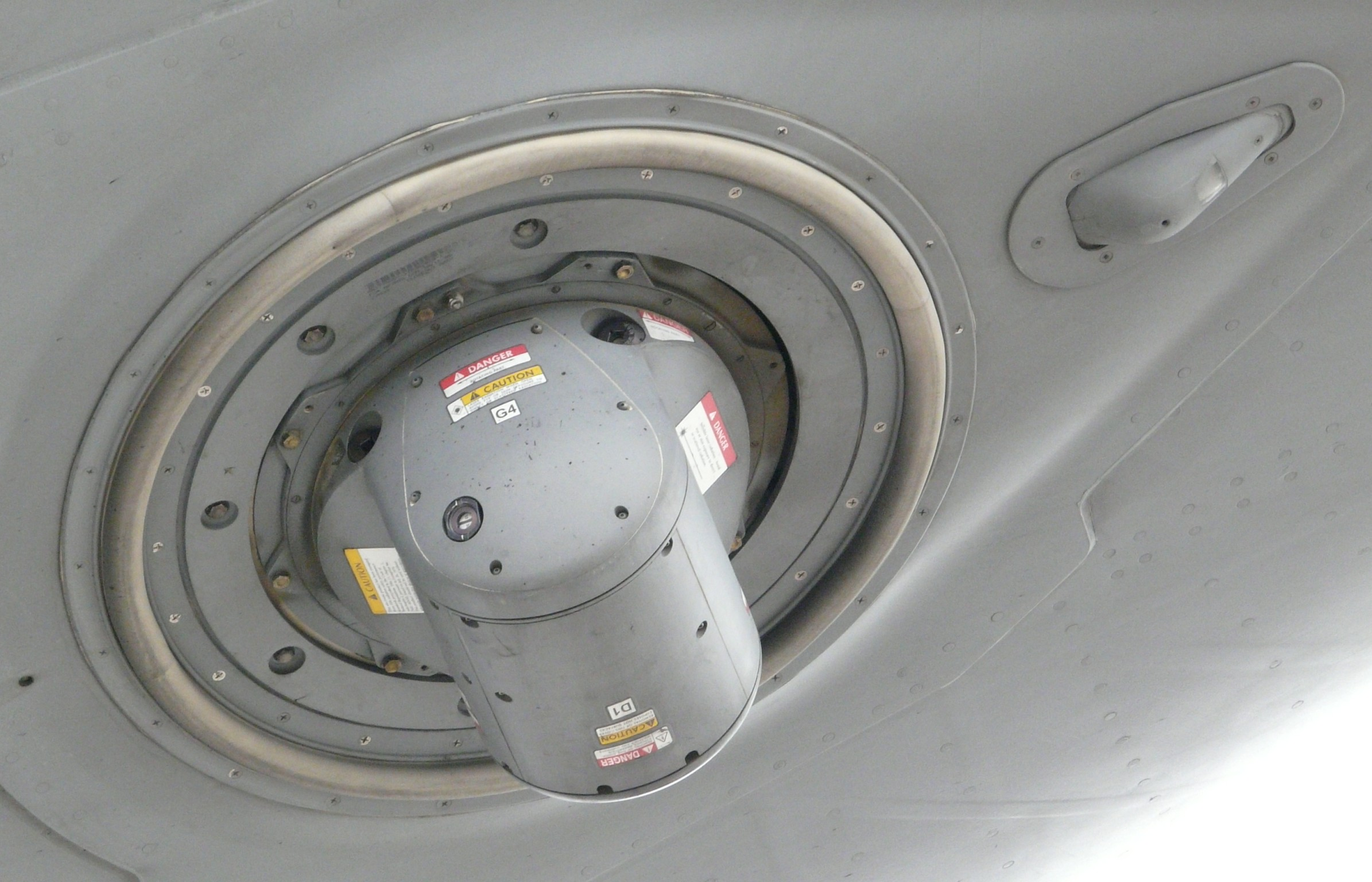
Northrop Grumman AN/AAQ-24 DIRCM

Directional Infrared Counter Measures (DIRCM) are a class of anti-missile systems produced to protect aircraft from infrared homing missiles, primarily MANPADS and similar simple systems.

Earlier infrared countermeasures like flares or hot block systems that produce random flashes of IR light are semi- or omnidirectional. This results in the missile seeker receiving relatively little IR energy due to the inverse square law. DIRCM systems instead aim their IR output directly at the missile using some source of tracking information and a trainable emitter. This allows a relatively small device to overwhelm the missile seeker by focusing all of its output on it.

Examples are produced by many aerospace companies, such as Aselsan, Leonardo S.p.A., Elbit Systems, Northrop Grumman, ITT Corporation, and BAE Systems. A Russian example is the 101KS-O.

== Method of operation ==
The systems use an effective method of jamming infrared missile seekers through the sensor aperture and can be placed in either active or standby mode. In the standby mode, the aircrew must select the active mode to begin jamming infrared (IR) threats. The pulsing flashes of IR energy confuse the missile guidance system, preventing the tracking of the target aircraft.

== Systems ==
=== AN/AAQ-24 Nemesis ===
The AN/AAQ-24 system is a directional infrared countermeasure (DIRCM) system. It consists of a missile warning system (AN/AAR-54), an integration unit, a processor, and laser turrets (Small Laser Transmitter Assembly, SLTA). Early versions of this system used an arc lamp to generate the jammer signal. The newer versions of this system manufactured by Northrop Grumman use diode-based laser pumping systems known by the name GUARDIAN. These systems are intended for potential fitting to commercial carriers pending the completion of multiple tests on the viability of such options.

The AN/AAQ-24 system is installed in the Northrop Grumman Guardian system marketed for commercial aircraft. The system will be installed by 2025 on C-17 Globemaster III, MC-130, CV-22 Osprey, and the CH-53E Super Stallion. In 2010, the US Defense Security Cooperation Agency announced to Congress a possible sale to Canada of eight AN/AAQ-24(V) DIRCMs including equipment and services for a total value of up to US$72 million. Other material and services would include publications and technical documentation, personnel training and training equipment, U.S. Government (USG) and contractor engineering, technical and logistics support services.

Large Aircraft Infrared Counter-Measure system (LAIRCM) was a US Military requirement for protecting its large aircraft from infrared-guided missiles. The AN/AAQ-24 Nemesis system was produced to serve this requirement.

LAIRCM-Lite is a C-17 program that uses a combination of laser jamming DIRCM and flares due to the limited availability of LAIRCM components.

=== 101KS-O ===
The 101KS-O is a DIRCM system mounted on the Sukhoi Su-57 fighter jet. It has sensors that are placed in turrets, which are mounted on two points: the dorsal spine and the forward fuselage under the cockpit. It uses modulated laser-based countermeasures to confuse or destroy incoming missiles' tracking mechanisms. The 101KS-O is the first DIRCM that is deployed on any fighter aircraft.

== See also ==
- AN/ALQ-144 – Military aircraft infrared guided missile countermeasures system
- YILDIRIM 100 – Turkish anti-missile system
- Civil Aircraft Missile Protection System – Type of infrared countermeasure
- Common Infrared Countermeasures program – Laser-based infrared protection system
- Flight Guard – Civil aircraft self-defence system
- Missile approach warning system – Avionics feature on military aircraft
- List of military electronics of the United States
