= Chole =

Chole can refer to:

- Chole Island, an island of the Tanzanian Mafia Archipelago
- Chole (woreda), one of the 180 woredas in the Oromia region of Ethiopia
- Chole, cooked or uncooked chickpeas
  - Chole masala, another name for chana masala, a chickpea dish in South Asia sometimes simply called "chole"
  - Chole bhature, a combination of chana masala and fried bread called bhatura
- Chole-, an Ancient Greek prefix meaning bile (from the Latin bilis: gall)
  - e.g. Choledoc: Common bile duct
- "Chole", medical slang for cholecystitis, or a patient with cholecystitis, an inflammation of the gallbladder
  - "Chole", also medical slang for a cholecystectomy, the surgical removal of the gallbladder
- Chole, a probable antecedent of the sport of golf
- "Chole", nickname for Soledad, California, as used by Chicano gangs
- Chole Shamba, another name for Mafia Island, part of the Tanzanian Mafia Archipelago
- Kate Chole, a minor fictional character in the BBC soap opera EastEnders

== See also ==
- Cholecystokinin
- Cholesterol
- Chloe (disambiguation)
