= Flight Guard =

Civil aircraft self-defence system

Flight Guard is an Elta Systems Ltd's brand name for a family of airborne systems for protecting civilian aircraft against man-portable air-defense systems.

The solution is part of Elbit Systems’ MUSIC™ family, which offers a series of advanced DIRCM (Directed Infrared Counter Measures) systems designed to protect aircraft from heat-seeking missiles, particularly shoulder-fired MANPADS. Alongside it, the J-MUSIC™ system was developed for large aircraft such as transport and refueling planes, and the Mini-MUSIC™ system is intended for helicopters and small to medium-sized aircraft.

== Description ==
Elta's Flight Guard is a missile detection and avoidance system that is installed on more than 200 military aircraft and helicopters as well as on several VIP commercial aircraft, and has been also installed in aircraft of the El Al, Arkia and Israir fleets that fly to high risk destinations.

In September 2003, a year after an attempt was made to shoot down an Arkia Israel Airlines Boeing 757 in Mombasa, Kenya in 2002, the Israeli Ministry of Transportation selected Elta Systems to perform advanced flight tests of Flight Guard for protecting its commercial aircraft. Part of the funding was used to obtain certification of the system by Israel's Civil Aviation Authority (CAA).

The system chosen comprised a radar-based missile approach warning system (MAWS) and countermeasure dispensing system. The system was chosen since it is specifically designed to defend low-flying aircraft against MANPADs, such as those utilized in the attack in Kenya. The automated system uses doppler radar to detect incoming missiles, before firing IMI-designed civilian flares as decoys against incoming infrared-homed missiles. It was planned that the production flares used would be invisible to the human eye.

== Controversy ==
The system has proved controversial, with both Switzerland and the FAA in the US raising fire hazard safety concerns. The Swiss have stated that any aircraft with the system installed will be grounded, despite uncovering a plot to down an El Al aircraft in that country; other European countries have indicated that they might follow suit.

== Future development ==
Although Flight Guard was approved by the Israeli CAA and several other countries, the Israel authority decided to buy a laser-based jamming system called Multi-Spectral Infrared Countermeasure (MUSIC) which began development in 2008, that does not use flares.

== See also ==
- CAMPS
- Common Infrared Countermeasures program
- Northrop Grumman Guardian
- AN/ALQ-144 - Infrared guided missile countermeasure system
- Directional Infrared Counter Measures
- 2002 Mombasa attacks - attack was co-ordinated with the shootdown attempt.
- List of airliner shootdown incidents
