= YILDIRIM 100 =

Turkish anti-missile system

The YILDIRIM-100 is a Turkish-made DIRCM system that is planned to be implemented on the Turkish fifth generation fighter jet TAI Kaan, as well as on other possible platforms.

The YILDIRIM-100 features a dual turret configuration, with each turret equipped with a Precision Tracking Unit and a Laser Unit capable of generating high-power laser beams. These turrets are synchronized to apply a multi-band, directed laser signal against infrared homing missiles. The system also includes a Control Unit that manages the DIRCM system and facilitates communication with the missile warning system.

The YILDIRIM-100 underwent rigorous testing within NATO, including live-fire exercises where actual missiles were launched as part of the demonstration. These trials are typically restricted to nations capable of producing DIRCM systems.
