= 2003 Baghdad DHL attempted shootdown incident =

DHL Flight 209

Coordinates: 33°15′45″N 44°14′04″E

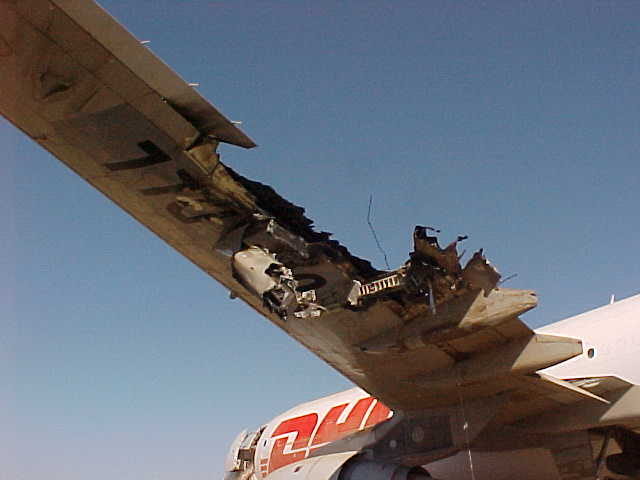
- Damage to the left wing after being struck by a surface-to-air missile

Attempted shootdown
- Date: 22 November 2003
- Summary: Missile attack leading to loss of hydraulics
- Site: Baghdad International Airport, Baghdad, Iraq

Aircraft
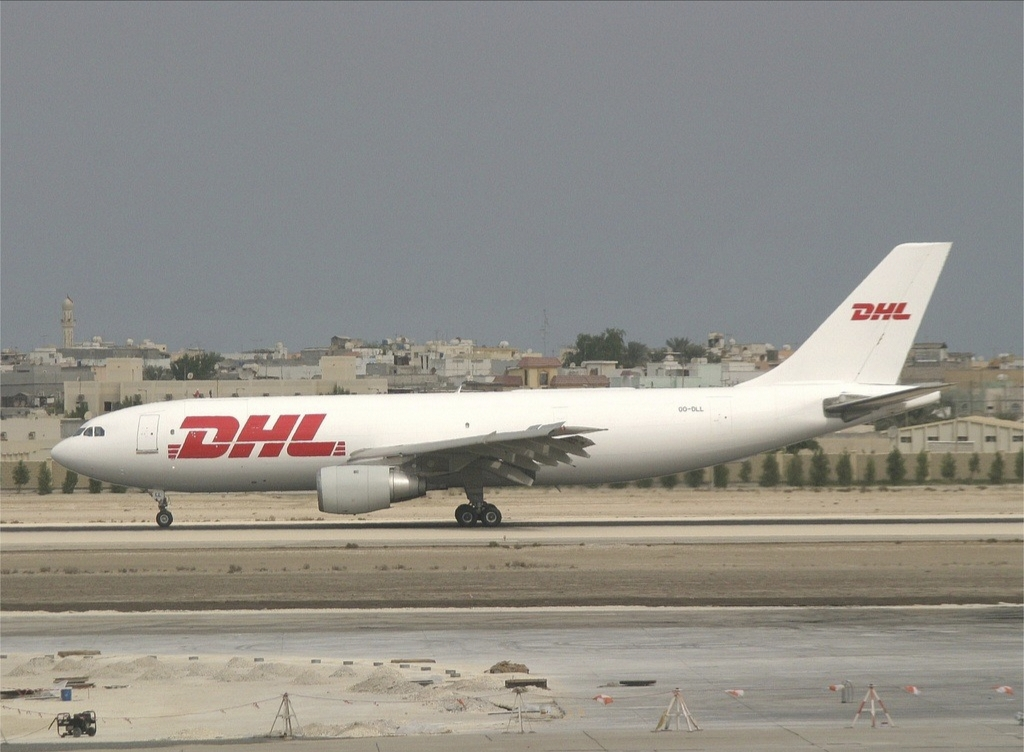
- OO-DLL, the aircraft involved, seen 2 days before the attempted shootdown
- Aircraft type: Airbus A300B4-203F
- Operator: European Air Transport
- Call sign: OSCAR OSCAR DELTA LIMA LIMA
- Registration: OO-DLL
- Flight origin: Baghdad International Airport; Baghdad, Iraq (Coalition Provisional Authority)
- Destination: Bahrain International Airport; Muharraq, Bahrain
- Occupants: 3
- Crew: 3
- Fatalities: 0
- Survivors: 3

On 22 November 2003, shortly after takeoff from Baghdad, Iraq, an Airbus A300 cargo plane, registered OO-DLL and owned by the Belgian division of European Air Transport (doing business as DHL Aviation), was struck on the left wing by a surface-to-air missile while on a scheduled flight to Muharraq, Bahrain. Severe wing damage resulted in a fire and complete loss of hydraulic flight control systems.

Returning to Baghdad, the three-man crew made an injury-free landing of the seriously damaged A300, using differential engine thrust as the only pilot input. This was despite major damage to a wing, total loss of hydraulic control, a faster-than-safe landing speed, and a ground path that veered off the runway surface and onto unprepared ground.

Paris Match reporter Claudine Vernier-Palliez accompanied a disbanded Fedayeen unit on their strike mission against the EAT aircraft.

Sara Daniel, a French weekly newsmagazine journalist, claimed receipt, from an unknown source, of a video that showed Iraqi insurgents (belonging to IAI), faces concealed, firing a missile at the EAT A300. Daniel was researching a feature about Iraqi resistance groups, but she denied any specific knowledge of the people who carried out the attack, despite being present at the moment of attack.

== Aircraft and crew ==
The aircraft involved was a 24-year-old Airbus A300B4-203F.

The plane had an experienced crew of three: two Belgians, 38-year-old Captain Éric Gennotte and 29-year-old First Officer Steeve Michielsen, and a Scotsman, 54-year-old flight engineer Mario Rofail. The captain had 3,300 total flight hours, more than half of them logged in the A300. The first officer had 1,275 hours of flight experience and the flight engineer had 13,400 hours of flight experience.

== Flight ==
External videos
- Footage of missile strike on YouTube

=== Missile strike ===
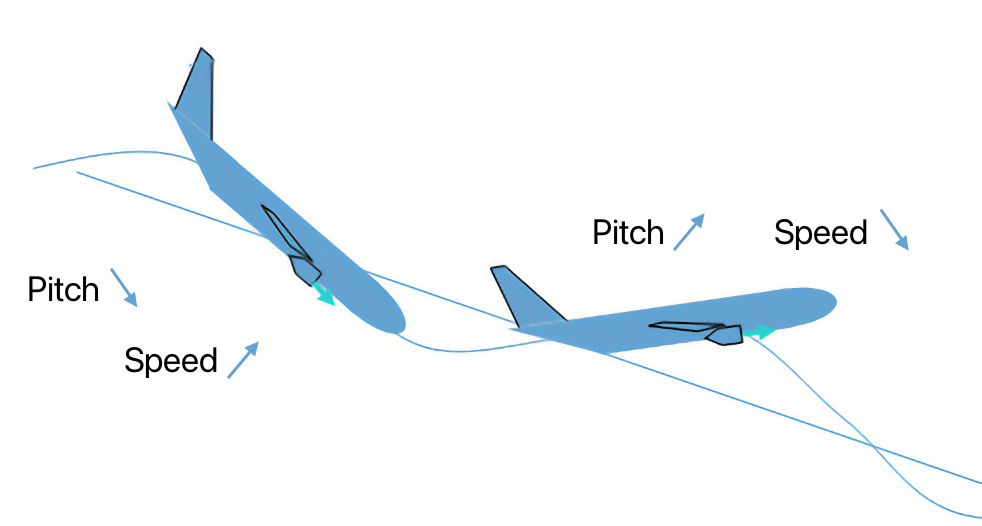
A diagram of a phugoid cycle

The aircraft took off from Baghdad International Airport en route to Bahrain International Airport at 06:30 UTC. To reduce exposure to ground attack, the aircraft was executing a rapid climbout. At around 8,000 ft (2,400 m) altitude, a 9K34 Strela-3 (SA-14 Gremlin) surface-to-air missile struck the rear of the left wing between the engine and the wing tip. The warhead damaged trailing-edge surfaces of the wing structure and caused a fire. All three hydraulic systems lost pressure, and flight controls were disabled. Because outboard left wing fuel tank 1A was full at takeoff, no fuel-air vapour explosion occurred. Liquid jet fuel dropped away as 1A disintegrated. Inboard fuel tank 1 was pierced and leaking. The aircraft pitched rapidly up and down in a roller-coaster phugoid, oscillating between a nose-up and a nose-down position.

As in the case of the 1989 United Airlines Flight 232 disaster in the United States, Captain Genotte could only use thrust to modify pitch, speed, and altitude and vary throttles asymmetrically to control yaw and turn the aircraft. Flight engineer Mario Rofail executed a gravity drop to extend the landing gear, a procedure normally accomplished with hydraulic power. Early deployment of the gear was critical to a safe outcome because increased drag helped reduce speed and stabilize the aircraft.

In about 10 minutes of experimentation, the crew learned to manage turns, climbs, and descents. After a meandering trajectory, they executed a right turn and initiated a descent path to Baghdad International Airport.

=== Final approach and emergency landing ===
External videos
- Landing footage on YouTube

Because of left wing damage and fuel loss, Rofail had to monitor the engine closely; if fuel flow was lost from the left side, he would have to feed fuel from a right tank to maintain thrust. Survival was dependent on accurate power control of each jet engine.

Genotte and Michielsen set up for a final approach to runway 33R. The aircraft drifted to the right of the intended course, so Genotte chose the shorter 33L runway. Visibility was excellent and the pilots managed a controlled descent. They knew, counterintuitively, that they could not reduce the throttles before touchdown without risking the nose or a wing smashing into the ground.

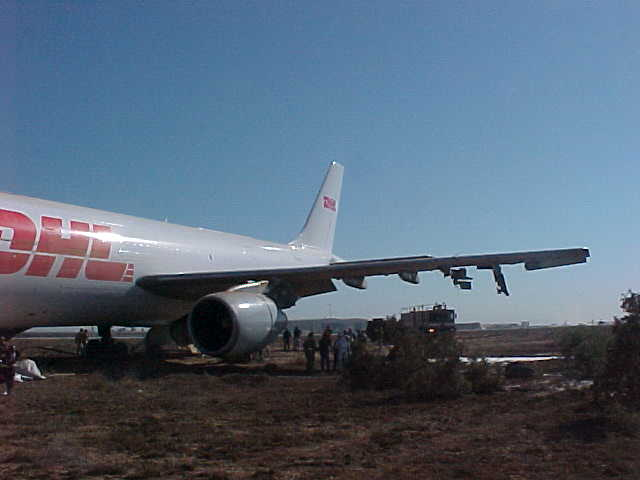
A view of the aircraft after it stopped

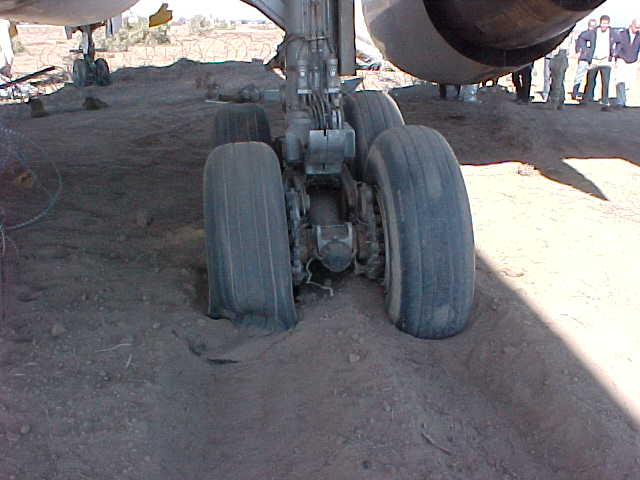
The right rear landing gear

Around 400 ft (120 m) above ground, turbulence upset the aircraft balance and the right wing dipped. With thrust adjustments, the roll was controlled, but the aircraft touched down off the runway centerline. Rofail immediately deployed full reverse thrust, but the aircraft veered off the paved runway. The aircraft ran through rough, soft ground, throwing up a plume of sand and dragging a razor-wire barrier, and halted after about 3,300 ft (1,000 m).

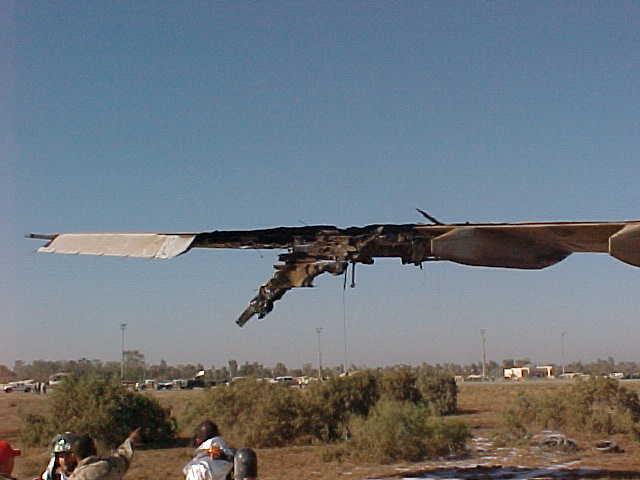
A close up of the left wing

== Awards and aftermath ==
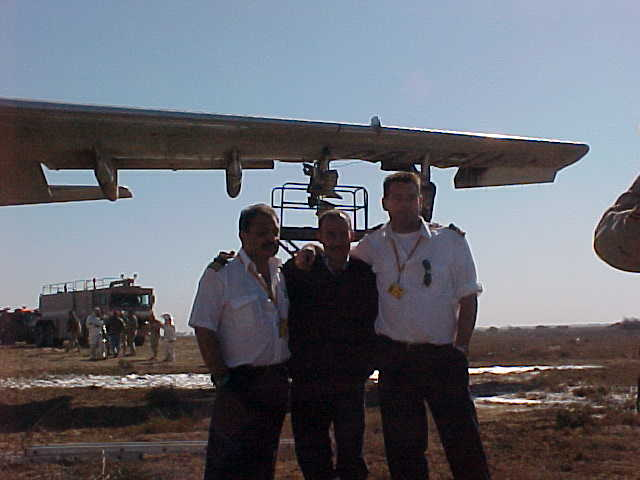
The flight crew after the incident

The Honourable Company of Air Pilots jointly honoured all three crewmembers with its Hugh Gordon-Burge Memorial Award. This is awarded to flight crew whose actions contributed outstandingly to saving their aircraft or passengers, or made a significant contribution to future air safety. The annual award is made only if a nomination is considered to be of significant merit.

The Flight Safety Foundation's FSF Professionalism Award in Flight Safety was presented to the crewmembers for their "extraordinary piloting skills in flying their aircraft to a safe landing after a missile strike following takeoff from Baghdad, Iraq".

The International Federation of Air Line Pilots' Associations (IFALPA) awarded each crew member with its Polaris Award - in recognition of acts of exceptional airmanship, heroic action or a combination of these two attributes. In extraordinary cases, passengers may also obtain this award for their heroism. These awards are not made every year but only on merit.

In addition to severe wing and undercarriage damage, both jet engines suffered ruinous abuse by ingesting debris. In November 2004, the aircraft was repaired and re-registered as N1452, then put up for sale, but remained unsold. The N1452 registration expired in 2017.

As of 2025, the aircraft remains at Baghdad International Airport.

== In popular culture ==
The incident was featured in "Attack over Baghdad", a season three (2005) episode of the Canadian TV series Mayday(called Air Emergency and Air Disasters in the U.S. and Air Crash Investigation in the UK and elsewhere around the world).

The aircraft was featured in an episode of Brum.

== See also ==
- Japan Air Lines Flight 123
- United Airlines Flight 232
- Azerbaijan Airlines Flight 8243
- Civil Aircraft Missile Protection System
- Flight Guard
- Flight with disabled controls
- List of airliner crashes involving loss of control
