= Civil Aircraft Missile Protection System =

Type of infrared countermeasure

Civil Aircraft Missile Protection System (CAMPS) is an infrared countermeasure against infrared-homed anti-aircraft missiles, specifically designed to defend civilian aircraft flying under 15,000 feet (4,600 m) against MANPADS.

The system was developed by Saab Avitronics, Chemring Countermeasures and Naturelink Aviation.

The decoys use a pyrophoric substance that burns at a relatively low temperature, thereby avoiding any fire safety concerns associated with conventional pyrotechnic military flares, such as those used by a similar Israeli system. The onboard processor uses neural network pattern recognition algorithms to classify potential threats detected by its infrared sensors. The system was successfully demonstrated at the Overberg Test Range, Bredasdorp in March 2007.

== See also ==
- Flight Guard
- ALQ-144 - Infrared guided missile countermeasure system
- Northrop Grumman Guardian
- Directional Infrared Counter Measures
- Common Infrared Countermeasures program
- 2002 Mombasa hotel bombing - attack was co-ordinated with the shootdown attempt.
- List of airliner shootdown incidents
