= Infrared countermeasure =

Device designed to protect aircraft from infrared homing missiles

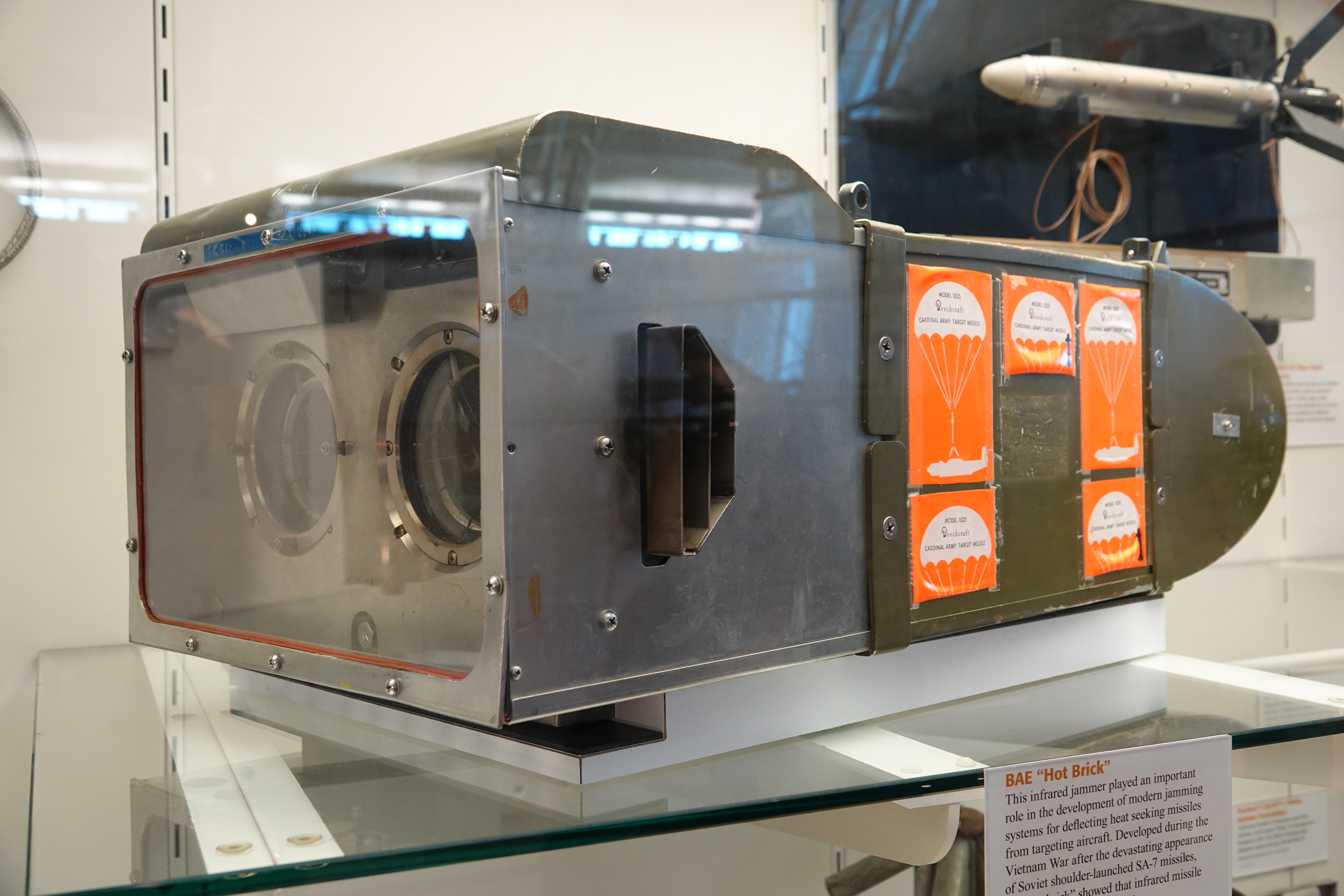
BAE Hot Brick infrared jammer

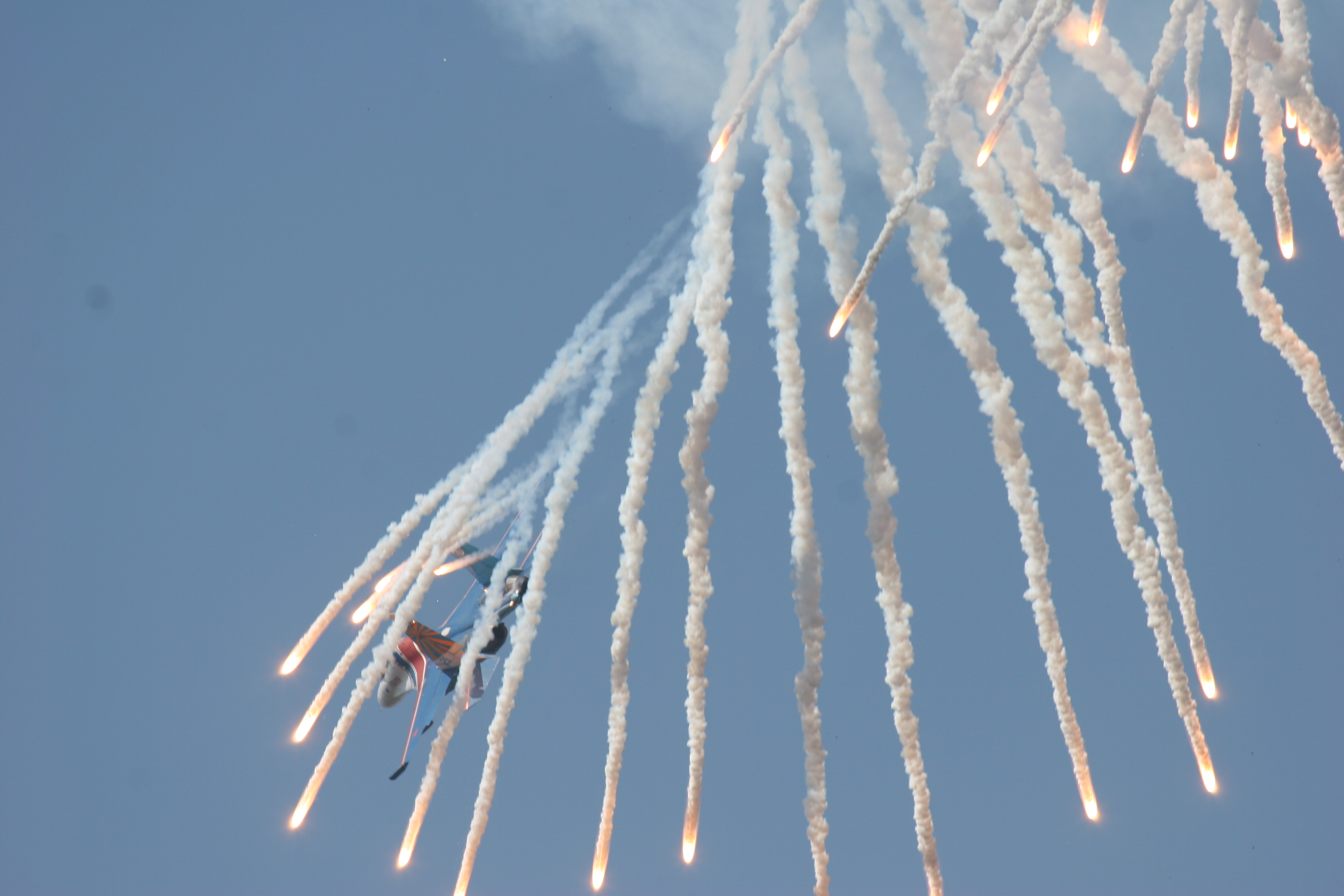
Sukhoi Su-27 shoots off flares

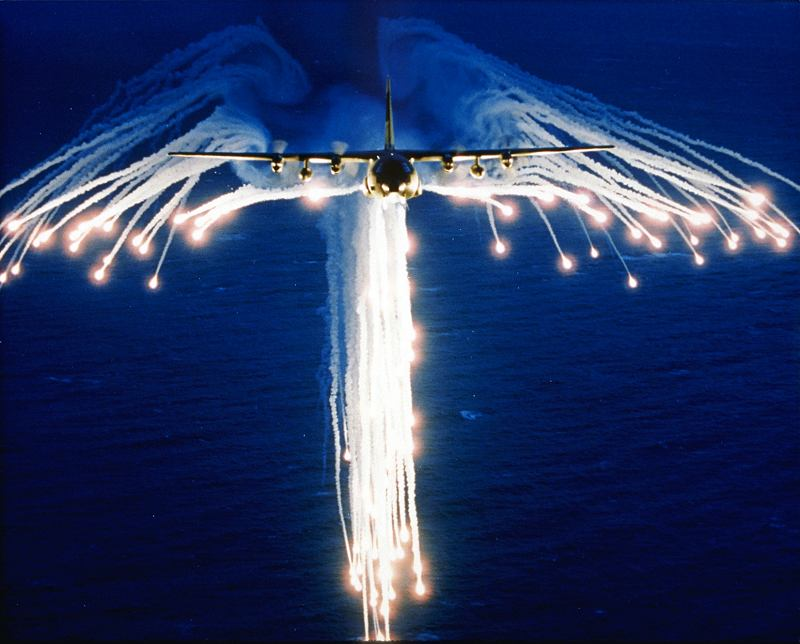
C-130 Hercules deploys flares, sometimes called angel flares because of their characteristic pattern

An infrared countermeasure (IRCM) is a device designed to protect aircraft from infrared homing ("heat seeking") missiles by confusing the missiles' infrared guidance system so that they miss their target (electronic countermeasure). Heat-seeking missiles were responsible for about 80% of air losses in Operation Desert Storm. The most common method of infrared countermeasure is deploying flares, as the heat produced by the flares creates hundreds of targets for the missile.

Conventional man-portable air defense systems (MANPADS)-launched missiles include an infrared sensor that is sensitive to heat, for example the heat emitted from an aircraft engine. The missile is programmed to home in on the infrared heat signal using a steering system. Using a rotating reticle as a shutter for the sensor, the incoming heat signal is modulated, and using the modulated signal, an on-board processor performs the calculations necessary to steer the missile to its target. Owing to their portable size, MANPADS missiles have a limited range, and a burn time of a few seconds from launch to extinguishing.

Countermeasure systems are usually integrated into the aircraft, such as in the fuselage, wing, or nose of the aircraft, or fixed to an outer section of the aircraft. Depending on where the systems are mounted, they can increase drag, reducing flight performance and increasing operating cost.

Because they are expensive, such countermeasure systems have been seldom used, primarily on military aircraft. Much time and money are spent on testing, maintaining, servicing, and upgrading systems. These procedures require that the aircraft be grounded for a period of time.

== History ==
In recent years, missile guidance systems have become increasingly sophisticated, and, as a result, there are a number of different types of missiles in existence. In some, the missile is outfitted with multiple sensors that detect infrared radiation at multiple wavelengths, using reticles that are encoded at different patterns. In view of the threat, various countermeasure techniques have become popular. A missile warning system scans the region for rocket launch signals, such as the infrared or ultraviolet signature of a rocket tail. Upon the detection of a missile launch, various countermeasure systems are activated. In one example, hot flares or chaff are released from the aircraft to confuse the infrared or radar system of the launched missile.

Other approaches broadcast light energy to confuse the missile's infrared sensors. In one example, light energy emitted by non-coherent flashlamps is directed toward the missile sensors, to confuse them and render them ineffective ("jamming"). IR missiles are vulnerable to high-powered IR carrier signals which blind the IR detector of the incoming IR missile. In addition, IR missiles are vulnerable to lower-powered IR carrier signals that are modulated using certain modulating signals that confuse its tracking system and cause the tracking system to track a false target. Conventional countermeasures to an IR missile threat include jamming systems which confuse or blind the IR missile using either IR lamps and/or IR lasers. These jamming systems transmit either a high-powered IR carrier signal to blind the IR detector of the incoming IR missile or transmit a lower-powered IR carrier signal modulated with a modulating signal to confuse the IR detector of the incoming missile.

As infrared missiles are increasingly cheap and simple, they have been increasingly dangerous. By one estimate more than 500,000 shoulder-fired surface-to-air missiles exist and are available on the worldwide market. The lethality and proliferation of IR surface-to-air missiles (SAMs) was demonstrated during the Desert Storm conflict, as approximately 80% of US fixed-wing aircraft losses in Desert Storm were from ground-based, Iraqi defensive systems using IR SAMS. Both IR SAMS and IR air-to-air missiles have seekers with improved Counter-Countermeasures (CCM) capabilities that seriously degrade the effectiveness of current expendable decoys. Man Portable Air Defense Systems (MANPADS) are the most serious threat to large, predictable, and slow flying air mobility aircraft. These systems are lethal, affordable, easy to use, and difficult to track and counter. According to a 1997 CIA Report, MANPADS have proliferated worldwide, accounting for over 400 casualties in 27 incidents involving civil aircraft over the previous 19 years. This proliferation has forced air mobility planners to frequently select less than optimal mission routes due to lack of defensive systems on airlift aircraft.

== Infrared missile seeker technology ==
Infrared missile seekers of the first generation typically used a spinning reticle with a pattern on it that modulates infrared energy before it falls on a detector (A mode of operation called Spin scan). The patterns used differ from seeker to seeker, but the principle is the same. By modulating the signal, the steering logic can tell where the infrared source of energy is relative to the missile direction of flight. In more recent designs the missile optics will rotate and the rotating image is projected on a stationary reticle (a mode called "conical scan") or stationary set of detectors which generates a pulsed signal which is processed by the tracking logic.

Most shoulder-launched (MANPADS) systems use this type of seeker, as do many air defense systems and air-to-air missiles (for example, the AIM-9L).

== Principles ==
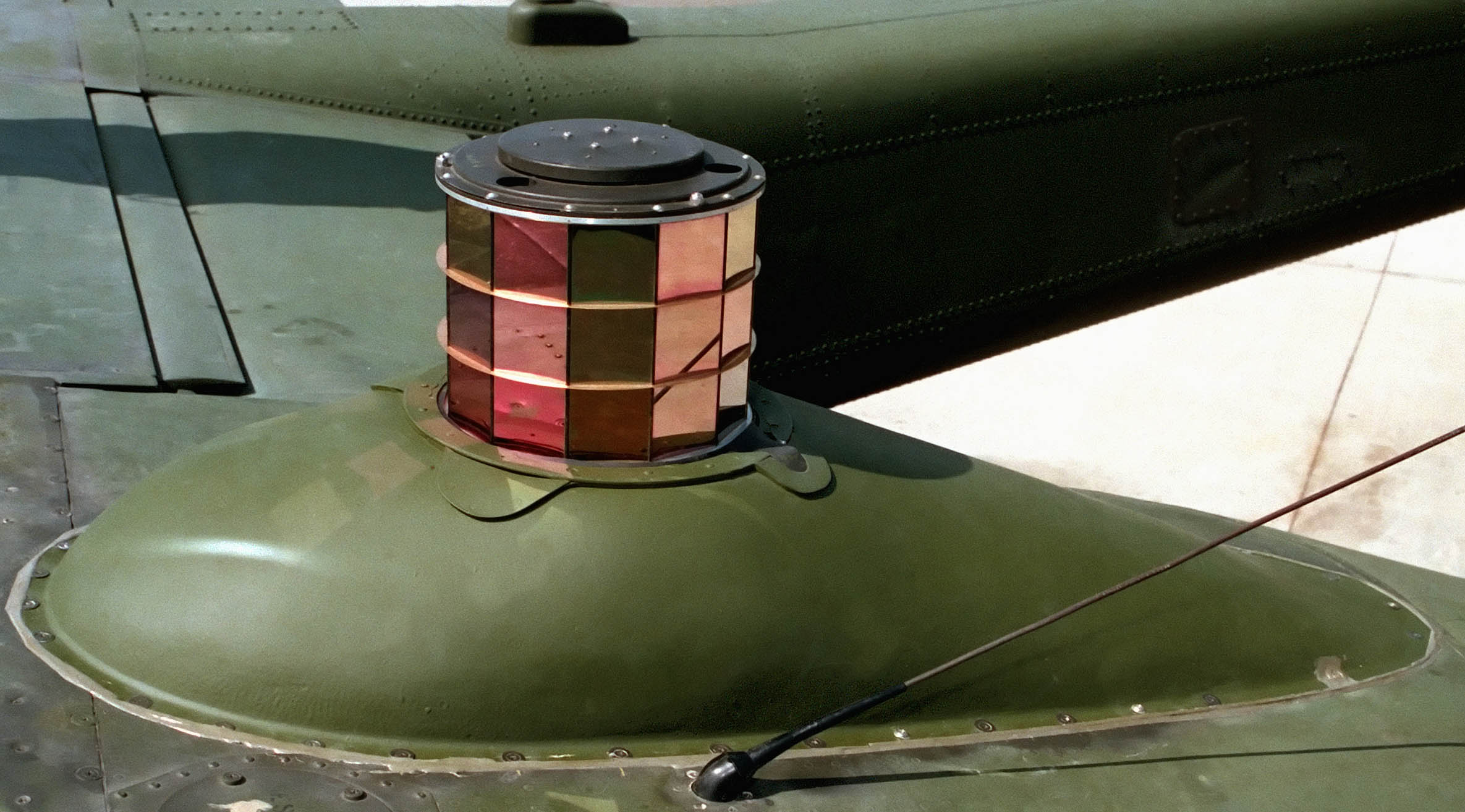
An ALQ-144 modulated IRCM jammer

Infrared seekers are designed to track a strong source of infrared radiation (usually a jet engine in modern military aircraft). IRCM systems are based on a source of infrared radiation with a higher intensity than the target. When this is received by a missile, it may overwhelm the original infrared signal from the aircraft and provide incorrect steering cues to the missile. The missile may then deviate from the target, breaking lock. Once an infrared seeker breaks lock (they typically have a field of view of 1–2 degrees), they rarely reacquire the target. By using flares, the target can cause the confused seeker to lock onto a new infrared source that is rapidly moving away from the true target.

The modulated radiation from the IRCM generates a false tracking command in the seeker tracking logic. The effectiveness of the IRCM is determined by the ratio of jamming intensity to the target (or signal) intensity. This ratio is usually called the J/S ratio. Another important factor is the modulation frequencies which should be close to the actual missile frequencies. For spin scan missiles the required J/S is quite low but for newer missiles the required J/S is quite high requiring a directional source of radiation (DIRCM).

== Flares ==
Flares create infrared targets with a much stronger signature than the aircraft's engines. The flares provide false targets that cause the missile to make incorrect steering decisions. The missile will rapidly break off a target lock-on.

== Directional IRCM ==
DIRCM, or Directional Infrared Countermeasures, avoid this potential drawback by mounting the energy source on a movable turret (much like a FLIR turret). They only operate when cued by a missile warning system of a missile launch, and use the missile plume to accurately aim at the missile seeker. The modulated signal can then be directed at the seeker, and the modulation scheme can be cycled to try to defeat a variety of seekers. Countermeasure success depends on a threat's tracking techniques and requires a proper analysis of the missile's capabilities. Defeating advanced tracking systems requires a higher level of DIRCM power. Issues of Laser Safety are also taken into account.

Israel has announced a program to develop a system called Multi Spectral Infrared Countermeasure (MUSIC) that will similarly use active lasers instead of flares to protect civilian aircraft against MANPADs. The US Army is deploying a similar system to protect its helicopters.

The Department of the Navy Large Aircraft Countermeasures (DoN LAIRCM) by Northrop Grumman provides infrared threat protection for U.S. Marine Corps CH-53E, CH-46E and CH-53D platforms.

BAE Systems' AN/ALQ-212 advanced threat infrared countermeasures (ATIRCM) – part of a directable infrared countermeasures suite – is fielded on U.S. Army CH-47 Chinook helicopters. The suite provides protection against an array of threats, including all infrared threat bands. The AN/ALQ-212 incorporates one or more infrared jam heads to counter multiple missile attacks.

At IDEX 2013, Italian company, Selex ES launched its Miysis DIRCM, suitable for all airborne platforms, rotary and fixed wing, large and small.

== Common Infrared Countermeasures (CIRCM) ==
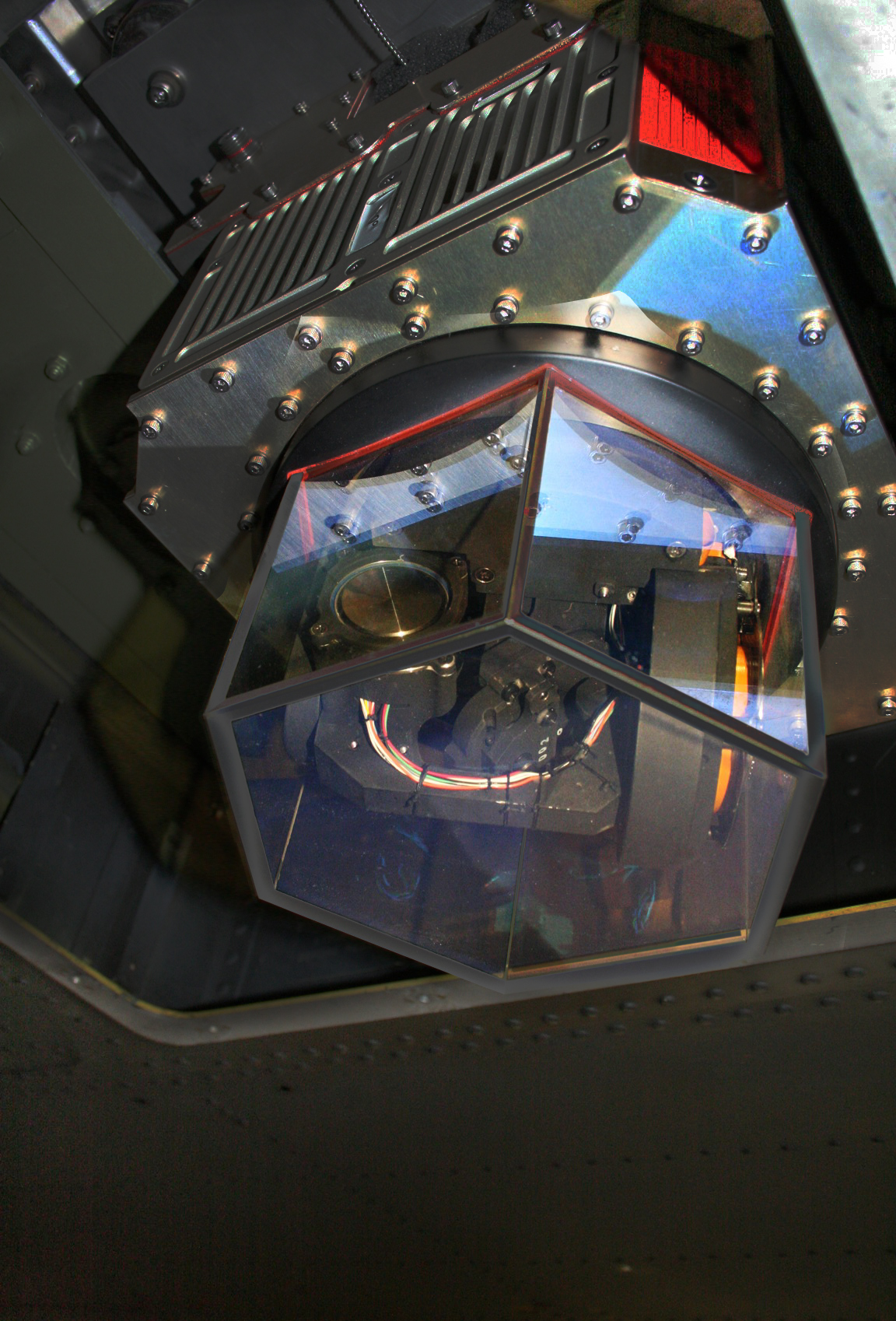
ITT's CIRCM fitted to US Army UH-60 during test exercises

Common Infrared Countermeasures (CIRCM) is a laser-based IR countermeasure against current and future IR threat systems for the US Army rotorcraft and fixed wing platforms and US Navy and US Air Force rotorcraft platforms. Systems by BAE Systems, ITT Defense and Information Solutions, Northrop Grumman and Raytheon were under consideration. In August 2015, Northrop Grumman won the contract.

== Fielded examples ==
Typical IRCM systems are the:

- AN/AAQ-24 by Northrop Grumman - DIRCM.
- AN/ALQ-132 by Sanders Associates/BAE Systems. Used in the 1960s in Vietnam, and was a fuel fired flashlamp system.
- AN/ALQ-144 by BAE Systems, used for helicopter defense.
- AN/ALQ-157 by BAE Systems, used for larger helicopters and aircraft.
- AN/ALQ-212 by BAE Systems, currently fielded on U.S. Army CH-47 Chinook helicopters.
- CAMPS by Saab Avitronics, used for civilian and VIP aircraft.
- CIRCM by Northrop Grumman
- Flight Guard by Israel Aerospace Industries, used in military and civilian aircraft (gain the nickname of "Live Saver" due to history of success in saving air vehicles during battles at several countries), but banned at several European airports.
- ITT's CIRCM System
- Selex ES' Miysis System
- "Sukhogruz" - Russian DIRCM (used on Su-25T).
- KT-01 AVE and KT-02 ACE by Adron, used for military aircraft
- 101KS-O - DIRCM used on Sukhoi Su-57

== See also ==
- Anti-aircraft
- Anti-ballistic missile
- Chaff (radar countermeasure)
- Countermeasure
- Electronic countermeasure
- Infrared signature
- Radar jamming and deception
- List of military electronics of the United States
