= Common Infrared Countermeasures program =

Laser-based infrared protection system

CIRCM, the Common Infrared Countermeasures program, is a United States Army initiative intended to develop a lightweight, low-cost and modular laser-based infrared protection system for U.S. helicopters and light fixed-wing aircraft. The technology will primarily provide defense against shoulder-fired, heat-seeking missiles, or MANPADS. The program is being developed to replace older suites such as the Advanced Threat Infrared Countermeasures (ATIRCM).

The CIRCM system will be designed to meet Tri-Service "common" Army, Navy, and Air Force requirements. The Department of Defense’s (DoD) strategy is to competitively develop a lightweight and cost-effective jammer subsystem for installation on all DoD rotary-wing and slow moving fixed-wing aircraft.

The Army took delivery of its first CIRCM systems from Northrop Grumman in 2016.

== Infrared countermeasures (IRCM) ==
Infrared guidance systems in heat-seeking missiles are designed to track strong sources of infrared radiation – heat – such as aircraft engines, helping missiles to home in on their targets. IRCM systems are based on a modulated source of infrared radiation with a higher intensity than the target itself. When a missile seeker observes this modulated radiation, it interferes with or obscures the modulated signal from the aircraft and renders the missile incapable of maintaining a lock on the target.

== Directional Infrared Counter Measures (DIRCM) ==
Directional IRCM, or DIRCM, allows for a countermeasures laser to be targeted directly at an incoming IR threat. This makes possible a more powerful and effective defense than previous, non-directional infrared countermeasures, as the threat is directly addressed rather than the system essentially painting an area with IR disruption, which results in a weaker signal in any given direction.

As IR seeking technology has improved and diversified, standard IRCM systems have become less effective at defeating heat-seeking missiles. Measures such as flares have begun to give way to lasers, which, when fitted on a directional pivoting mount, allow for more effective, concentrated and energy-efficient directional targeting of IR radiation at incoming missile seekers.

== CIRCM program background ==
CIRCM was authorized in April 2009 by the U.S. Undersecretary of Defense for Acquisition, Technology and Logistics (USD (AT&L)), as a next generation program to replace the combined Advanced Threat Infrared Countermeasures/Common Missile Warning System (ATIRCM/CMWS) program. The program was designated as an Acquisition Category (ACAT) 1D program, also in April 2009.

The CIRCM system, (along with the older LAIRCM and ATIRCM systems) provide a directional infrared countermeasure, which employs both threat-tracking capabilities, as well defensive measures employing modulating laser pulses to confuse missiles' guidance systems causing them to miss their target.

The Army issued a draft request for proposals for the CIRCM contract in May 2009, opening the competitive phase for a deal to develop and install the missile jammer on thousands of helicopters and tiltrotors in US military inventory.

The winning contractor will provide an initial 1,076 systems to supply AH-64 Apache, UH-60 Black Hawk, CH-47 Chinook and future armed scout helicopters. Currently, the DoD plans to award two or more 21-month technology development contracts first, followed by a two-year engineering and manufacturing development phase, with production to begin in 2015 and deployment in 2017. The program has an expected value of $1.5 billion.

Competition is fierce for the CIRCM program, with four established industry teams vying for what seems to be one of the few new starts the armed services will pursue in a "bleak" budgetary environment.

== Current systems in operation ==
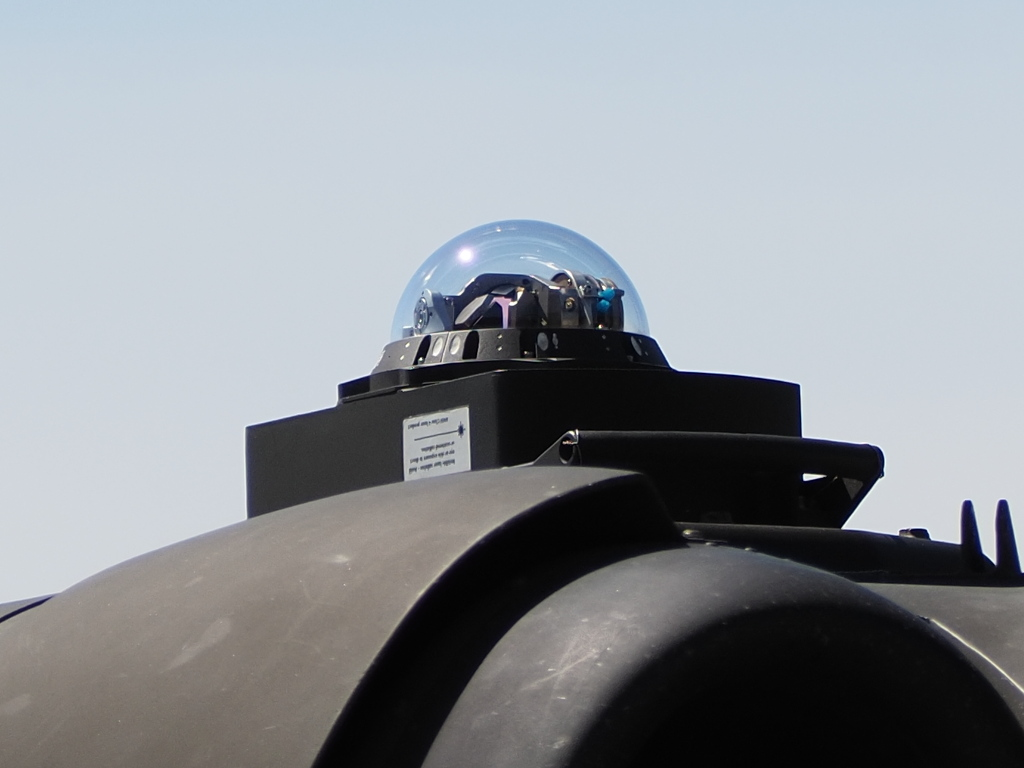
Northrop Grumman pointer/tracker of CIRCM on UH-60M Black Hawk

The CIRCM system is intended to be an improved, lighter-weight version of the ATIRCM system. CIRCM lowers the weight of the system and therefore brings with it the opportunity to deploy this kind of laser counter-measure across a wider portion of the fleet. Northrop Grumman has delivered over 250 CIRCM systems to the U.S. Army by March 2023.

== Advanced Threat Infrared Countermeasures (ATIRCM) ==
Advanced Threat Infrared Countermeasures, or ATIRCM, is the most recent attempt at an infrared countermeasures capability. The Army began fielding the ATIRCM Quick Reaction Capability (QRC) system on 83 CH-47s supporting operations in Iraq and Afghanistan in 2009. The USD (AT&L) limited the ATIRCM QRC program to these specific aircraft, due to the current combined weight of the ATIRCM/CMWS suite. DoD planners set the CIRCM target weight at 85 pounds for the jamming B-kit with two turrets, while the supporting A-kit is capped at 70 pounds for large rotorcraft like the Chinook and V-22 Osprey tiltrotor, or 35 pounds for smaller helicopters like the Black Hawk.

Service officials have said they want to field a cheaper, lighter system for their remaining helicopters, which will integrate smoothly with systems like CMWS and the Joint and Allied Threat Awareness System (JATAS), across all branches of the military.

=== ATIRCM Nunn–McCurdy breach ===
The Nunn–McCurdy provision introduced in 1982 by Senator Sam Nunn and Congressman Dave McCurdy requires that any defense program that increases in cost by more than 15% over its acquisition cycle must be reported to Congress and either restructured or fully explained by the Office of the Secretary of Defense. In June 2010, Under Secretary of Defense for Acquisition, Technology and Logistics Dr. Ashton Carter made such a report on the ATIRCM program.

In a June 2010 letter to Representative Ike Skelton, D-Mo., Carter explained how restructuring the ATIRCM/CMWS program caused a breach of the Nunn-McCurdy statute, since, when military officials determined the ATIRCM system to be too heavy for any helicopter except the CH-47, the purchase quantity had to be substantially reduced - down to 83 units. This caused the unit cost to rise above Nunn–McCurdy limits. As part of the Nunn–McCurdy certification process, in which the Pentagon explains the cost growth to Congress and reaffirms why the program is still essential to national security, officials have to show that lower-cost alternatives are not available. This is partly why the DoD has stipulated that the CIRCM system will need to integrate with existing and future detection systems while also dramatically reducing unit weight.

== Large Aircraft Infrared Countermeasures (LAIRCM) ==
The Department of the Navy (DoN) also operates an infrared countermeasures program called LAIRCM, which is fielded exclusively on large fixed-wing aircraft, and uses a laser pointer-tracker to defeat IR-guided threats.

LAIRCM systems such as the AAQ-24, delivered to the DoN by Northrop Grumman, are directed IR countermeasures designed to defend large fixed-wing aircraft from IR-guided threats. LAIRCM was devised to protect planes by automatically detecting missile launches and activating a high-intensity system of pulsed lasers to track and defeat the threat by confusing its guidance system.

== Integration with the Common Missile Warning System (CMWS) ==
The Common Missile Warning System, or CMWS, consists of missile warning sensors operating in the solar-blind ultra-violet wavelengths capable of detecting incoming missile threats and an electronic control unit that informs the aircraft crew of the threat, automatically triggering flare/chaff countermeasures.

As of the end of 2009, the production CMWS, coupled with chaff/flare dispensers was deployed on approximately 1,000 Army CH-47 Chinooks, UH-60 Blackhawks, AH-64 Apaches, [R]C-12 Hurons, UC-35 Citations and C-23 Sherpa Aircraft.

In the future, the military will utilize the integrated CMWS/CIRCM suite to enhance threat warning and improve defensive countermeasures for helicopters and small, slow-moving fixed-wing aircraft, whose size precludes the use of LAIRCM. The systems will protect aircraft and crews from shoulder-fired, vehicle-launched, and other advanced infrared-guided missile threats during dangerous low-altitude operations.

CIRCM will integrate with CMWS, which will identify an incoming threat (i.e. whether it is a missile or tracer fire, etc.), and then integrate with CIRCM's onboard tracking system.

== Additional CIRCM specifications ==
The DoD requires that CIRCM implement a Modular Open System Approach (MOSA) to integrate jamming lasers, missile trackers and missile warning receivers.

US military helicopter losses to MANPAD systems prompted Army Aviation to field the BAE Systems AAR-57 Common Missile Warning System (CMWS), to locate incoming missiles accurately. The Navy is continuing development of JATAS to integrate Missile Warning Receiver, Hostile Fire Indicator and Laser Warning Receiver functions. MOSA interfaces will make it possible for CIRCM to take cues from either warning system. It is important for reasons of expediency and cost that when a CIRCM system is chosen and fielded on US aircraft, it is backward compatible with CMWS, and forward compatible with JATAS, according to Army Lt. Col. Raymond Pickering, product manager for infrared countermeasures at the Program Executive Office-Intelligence, Electronic Warfare and Sensors (PEO IEWS).

The program is currently in the technology demonstration phase.

== See also ==
- List of military electronics of the United States
- Joint Electronics Type Designation System
