= AN/ALQ-144 =

Military aircraft infrared guided missile countermeasures system

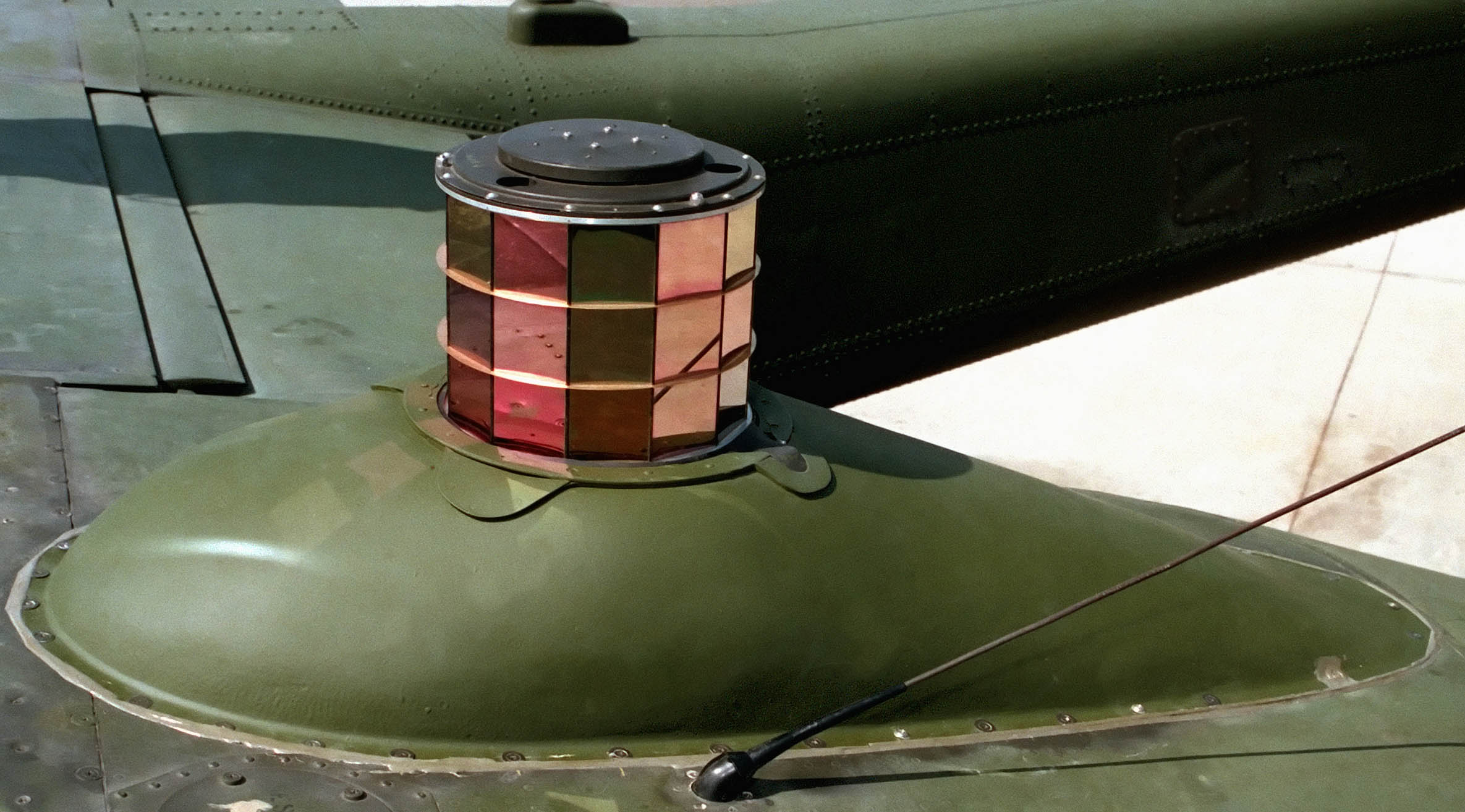
An ALQ-144 jammer mounted on an OV-10 Bronco.

The AN/ALQ-144, AN/ALQ-147, and AN/ALQ-157 are US infrared anti-aircraft missile countermeasure devices (IRCM). They were developed by Sanders Associates in the 1970s to counter the threat of infrared guided surface-to-air missiles like the 9K32 Strela-2. While decoy flares were effective at jamming first generation infra-red guided missiles, each flare was only effective for a short period. If an aircraft needed to loiter over a high risk area or was flying slowly (as helicopters do), it would require a large number of flares to decoy any missile fired at it. The IRCM provided constant protection against infra-red guided missiles.

The ALQ-144 and ALQ-147 were first delivered to the US military in 1981. Currently there are over 3,500 in use with the US military, and a total of 6,000 in use by nineteen countries globally. Seven hundred ALQ-157 systems are currently in service.

In accordance with the Joint Electronics Type Designation System (JETDS), the "AN/ALQ-144", "-147" and "-157" designations represent the 144th, 147th and 157th designs of an Army-Navy airborne electronic device for special countermeasures equipment. The JETDS system also now is used to name all Department of Defense electronic systems.

== ALQ-144/ALQ-147 ==
Both systems consist of a heated silicon carbide block or cesium arc-lamp that radiates a large amount of infra-red energy. It is surrounded by a large cylindrical mechanical shutter that modulates the infra-red output, producing a pulsing pattern. Early infrared guided missiles used a rotating reticle. When a target was not on the sensor's centerline, it would produce a pulse as the reticle swept over the target. When the target was on the sensor's centerline, the sensor would produce a constant signal. This constant signal was required by the early missiles to produce a "lock on" that would allow a launch.

The ALQ-144 and 147 IRCM produced a pattern of pulses that was approximately synchronized with the rotation rate of these reticles. Before launch this would prevent the missile actually locking onto the target, preventing the operator from firing the missile. After launch this would cause the missile to think that the target was off to one side and cause the missile to steer away from the aircraft carrying the IRCM.

The introduction of rosette and "staring" scanning techniques in second generation missiles reduced the effectiveness of the ALQ-144 and 147; later upgrades restored the effectiveness of the jammers.

The ALQ-144A was rushed into US service in time for the 1991 Gulf War, as Iraq had stocks of 9K34 Strela-3 and 9K38 missiles, against which the ALQ-144 was only partially effective. By the time the war started, two-thirds of the AH-64 Apaches in the persian Gulf had been upgraded to ALQ-144A standard. The only AH-64 Apache lost to an infra-red guided missile was hit by a 9K34 Strela-3 missile; the helicopter in question was one of the few that had not been upgraded.

The ALQ-144's distinctive appearance has earned it the nicknames "disco light", "disco ball", "mirror-ball" or "R2-D2".

== ALQ-157 ==
Produced by Loral, the system consists of two emitters, each one covering one side of a large aircraft. The system is microprocessor controlled and has five pre-set jamming patterns.

== Specifications ==
Designation	Entered service	Output	Weight	Platforms
ALQ-144	1980	1.7 kW	28 lb (12.5 kg)	AH-1J SeaCobra, AH-1S Cobra, AH-1T Improved SeaCobra, AH-1W SuperCobra, AH-64 Apache, EH-1H Iroquois, EH-60A Black Hawk, OV-10D Bronco, UH-1 Iroquois, UH-60 Black Hawk
ALQ-147	1980	?	?	
ALQ-157	1984	2 kW (later 4 kW)	218 lb (99 kg)	C-130 Hercules, C-130J Super Hercules, CH-46E Sea Knight, CH-47 Chinook, CH-53 Sea Stallion, E-2C Hawkeye, P-3C Orion, SH-3 Sea King

== Variants ==
- ALQ-144 electrically powered IRCM
  - ALQ-144A upgraded system to deal with more recent generations of IR guided missiles.
  - ALQ-144A(V)1 – Standard in helicopter jammer
  - ALQ-144A(V)3 – Added RFCM on/off switch
  - ALQ-144A(V)5 – Increased protection with a dual phaselocked transmitters and jam code selector switch on the operator control unit
  - ALQ-144A+ – Increased protection with the higher power
  - ALQ-144A+(5) – Increased protection plus with the dual phaselocked ALQ-144A+ transmitter
- ALQ-147 mounted in a modified 150 US gallon (570 liter) drop tank, it is a fuel powered IRCM.
  - ALQ-147A upgraded system to deal with more recent generations of IR guided missiles.
- ALQ-157 large aircraft version of the system fitted to CH-47 Chinook and C-130 Hercules aircraft, consists of two units, each giving semi-circular coverage.
  - ALQ-157M upgraded system to deal with more recent generations of IR guided missiles.

== See also ==
- Boeing EA-18G Growler
- CAMPS Civil Aircraft Missile Protection System
- Electronic countermeasures
- Electronic warfare
- Northrop Grumman EA-6B Prowler
- List of military electronics of the United States
- Similar US military aircraft ECM systems

=== Related ECMs ===
- AN/ALQ-99
