= FN-6 =

Chinese man-portable surface-to-air missile

HN-6 / FN-6 (Hongying-6 / Feinu-6)
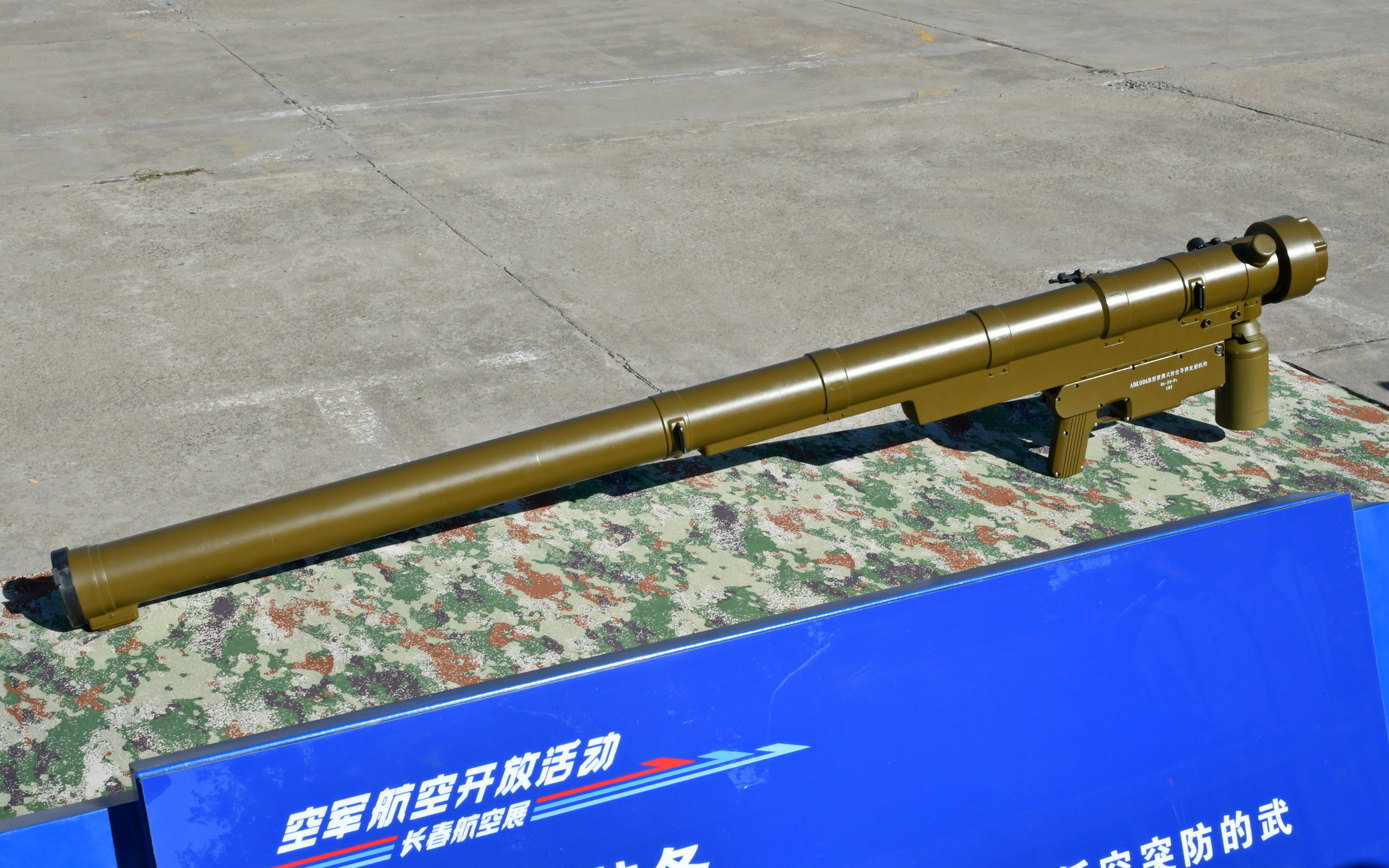
- HN-6B (FN-16) in the PLAAF service, designated ABK-006B
- Type: Man-portable surface-to-air missile
- Place of origin: China

Service history
- In service: 2000–present
- Used by: See Operators
- Wars: Syrian civil war; War in Iraq (2013–2017); Internal conflict in Myanmar; Russo-Ukrainian War

Production history
- Designed: 1990s
- Manufacturer: Shanghai Academy of Spaceflight Technology (SAST)
- Variants: See Variants

Specifications (HN-6 (FN-6))
- Mass: 16 kg (35 lb)
- Length: 1,495 mm (4.905 ft)
- Diameter: 72 mm (2.8 in)
- Wingspan: 0.18 m (0.59 ft)
- Engine: Rocket Motor
- Operational range: 0.5–6 km (0.31–3.73 mi)
- Flight altitude: 15–3,800 m (49–12,467 ft)
- Maximum speed: 600 m/s (Mach 1.8)
- Guidance system: Multi-element passive infrared homing
- Launch platform: MANPADS & surface

FN-6 (Chinese: 飞弩-6; pinyin: Fēi Nú-6; lit. 'Flying Crossbow-6'; NATO reporting name: CH-SA-10) is a third-generation passive infrared homing (IR) man portable air defence system (MANPADS) built by Shanghai Academy of Spaceflight Technology (SAST) of China Aerospace Science and Technology Corporation (CASC). Developed from the HN-5 missile, the FN-6 missile is an export-oriented product and one of China's most advanced shoulder-fired surface-to-air missile offered on the international market.

The missile has been exported to Malaysia, Cambodia, Sudan, Pakistan, and Peru, and a variant was incorporated into People's Liberation Army (PLA) service as the HN-6 (Chinese: 红樱-6). Based on FN-6, China also developed the improved FN-16 (NATO reporting name: CH-SA-14) and its domestic version HN-6B.

== Development ==
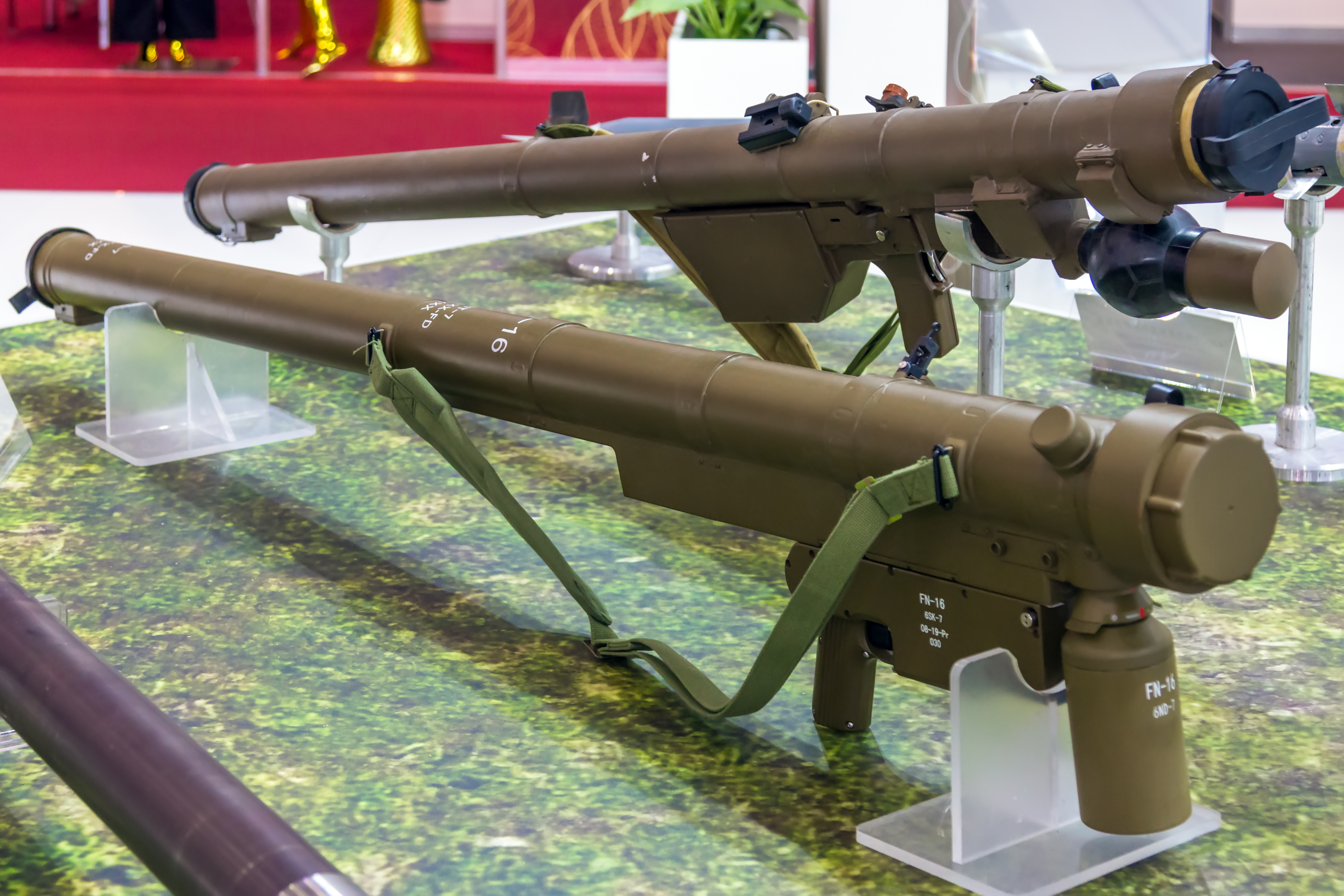
FN-16 (front) and QW-2 (back)

The FN-6 was developed from China's first man-portable air-defense system (MANPADS), the HN-5 and HN-5A, built by China Aerospace Science and Industry Corporation (CASIC) and Shanghai Academy of Spaceflight Technology (SAST). CASIC developed the second-generation MANPADS based on the HN-5, called QW-1, which later expanded into the QW missile series. While SAST developed the next iteration of the HN-5 missile in parallel, called HN-6 (Chinese: 红缨-6; pinyin: hóng yīng-Liù; lit. 'red tassel-6'), which is a third-generation MANPADS.

The HN-6, called HongYing-6, is the designation used in the PLA. The export version of the HN-6 is called the FN-6 (Chinese: 飞弩-6; pinyin: Fēi Nú-6; lit. 'Flying Crossbow-6'). Export sales of the weapon are the responsibility of China National Precision Machinery Import and Export Corporation, a state-owned trading company responsible for representing the domestic defense production industry in air defense-related products.

The HN-6 was used by Chinese military units in the year 2000.

The HN-6B (Chinese: 红缨-6B; pinyin: hóng yīng-Liù B; lit. 'red tassel-6B'), export designation FN-16 (Chinese: 飞弩-16; pinyin: Fēi Nú-16; lit. 'Flying Crossbow-16'), is an upgraded variant of the FN-6. It features major changes in the seeker and missile design. The FN-16 was showcased at the Zhuhai Airshow 2012. The FN-16 is also translated as Feiying-16 (Chinese: 飞鹰-16; pinyin: Fēi yīng-16; lit. 'flying eagle'), instead of Feinu-16, in Chinese.

== Design ==
According to Janes Information Services, the FN-6 is a third-generation, passive infrared, man-portable air defense system (MANPADS). The weapon can target aircraft flying at low and very low altitudes. An IFF antenna and an optional clip-on optical sight are fitted onto the launcher. The weapon has a pyramid-shaped seeker nose cone, similar to that of the French Mistral missile. The FN-6 uses an 8-sided design, while the Mistral uses a 6-sided one. Most MANPADS use spherical nose cones; the FN-6 adopted the pyramidal, faceted design primarily due to reduced aerodynamic drag compared to traditional rounded shapes.

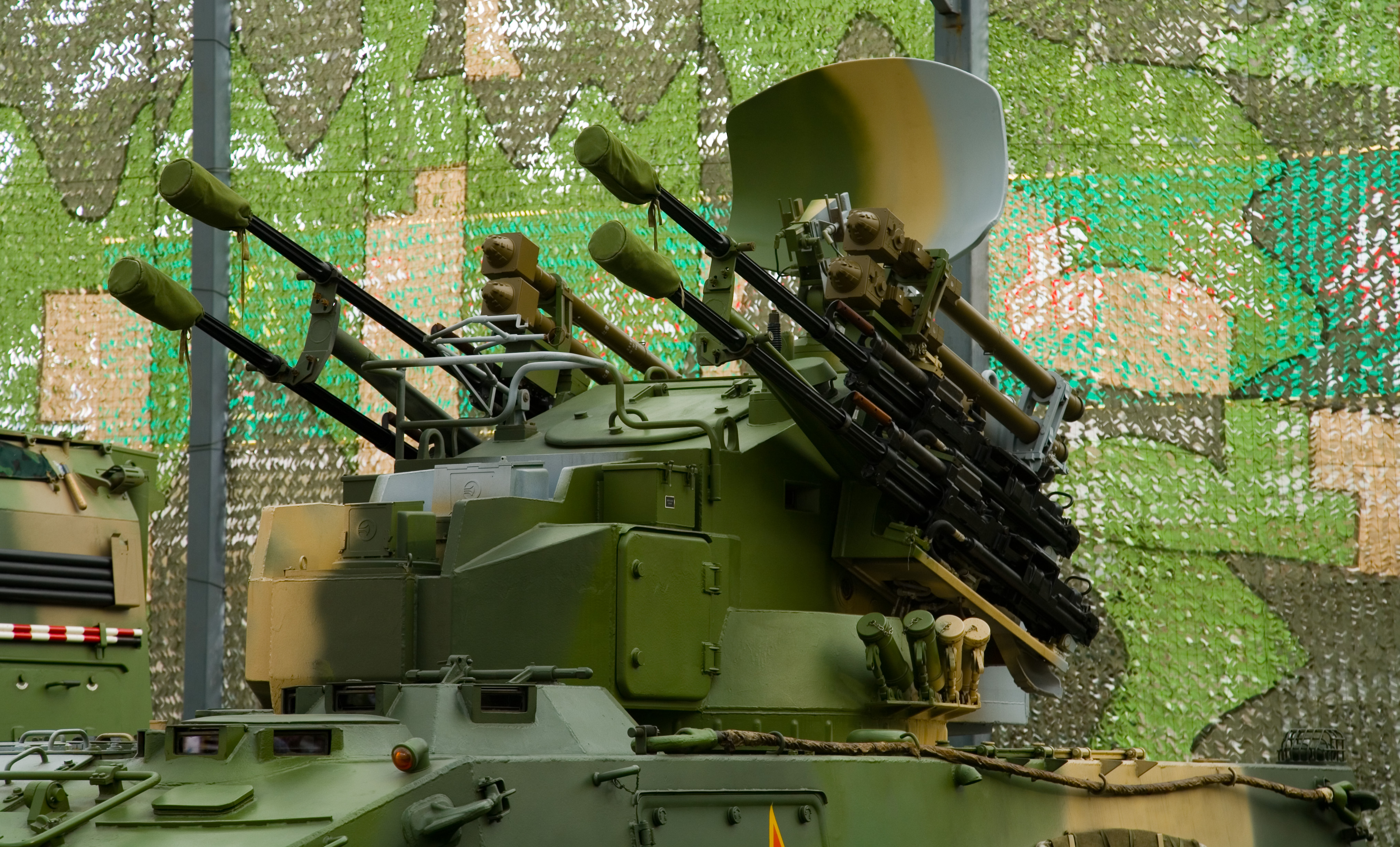
The FN-6 missile mounted on the PGZ-95; the missile are visiable above the 25 mm autocannons. Noted the box-shaped assembly containing FN-6's detached tail fins, a distinct design characteristic that identifies the FN-6 missile

The FN-6 is not a copy of Mistral. Two missiles differ in performance and in weight class. The FN-6 launcher's front-end has a distinctive box-shaped structure. The box contains the slip-on tail fin assembly. The FN-6 has four folded control canards at its front, and four non-moving tail fins. These tail fins are detached from the missile body and stored inside that square box at the front of the launch tube. When the FN-6 missile is fired, the rocket engine pushes the missile through the tight-fitting collar of the tail fins, locking them firmly at the missile rear-end. This unique mechanism removes the need for a large folding-fin mechanism carved within the missile body, saving weight.

The complete FN-6 missile system weighs 16 kg (35 lb). The missile is 1.495 m (4.90 ft) in length, and has a diameter of 72 mm (2.8 in). The weight of the missile is 10.77 kg (23.7 lb). It uses a single-stage solid rocket motor, and can engage the target with a maximum speed of 360 m/s (Mach 1.1) when flying head-on, and 300 m/s (Mach 0.88) when tail chasing. The missile's operating range is from 500 m (1,600 ft) to 6 km (3.7 mi), and its operating altitude is from 15 m (49 ft) to 3.5 km (2.2 mi). The manufacturer claimed the missile has a single-shot kill probability of 0.7 and can engage targets maneuvering at up to 4 G. The missile itself can maneuver to at least 18 G.

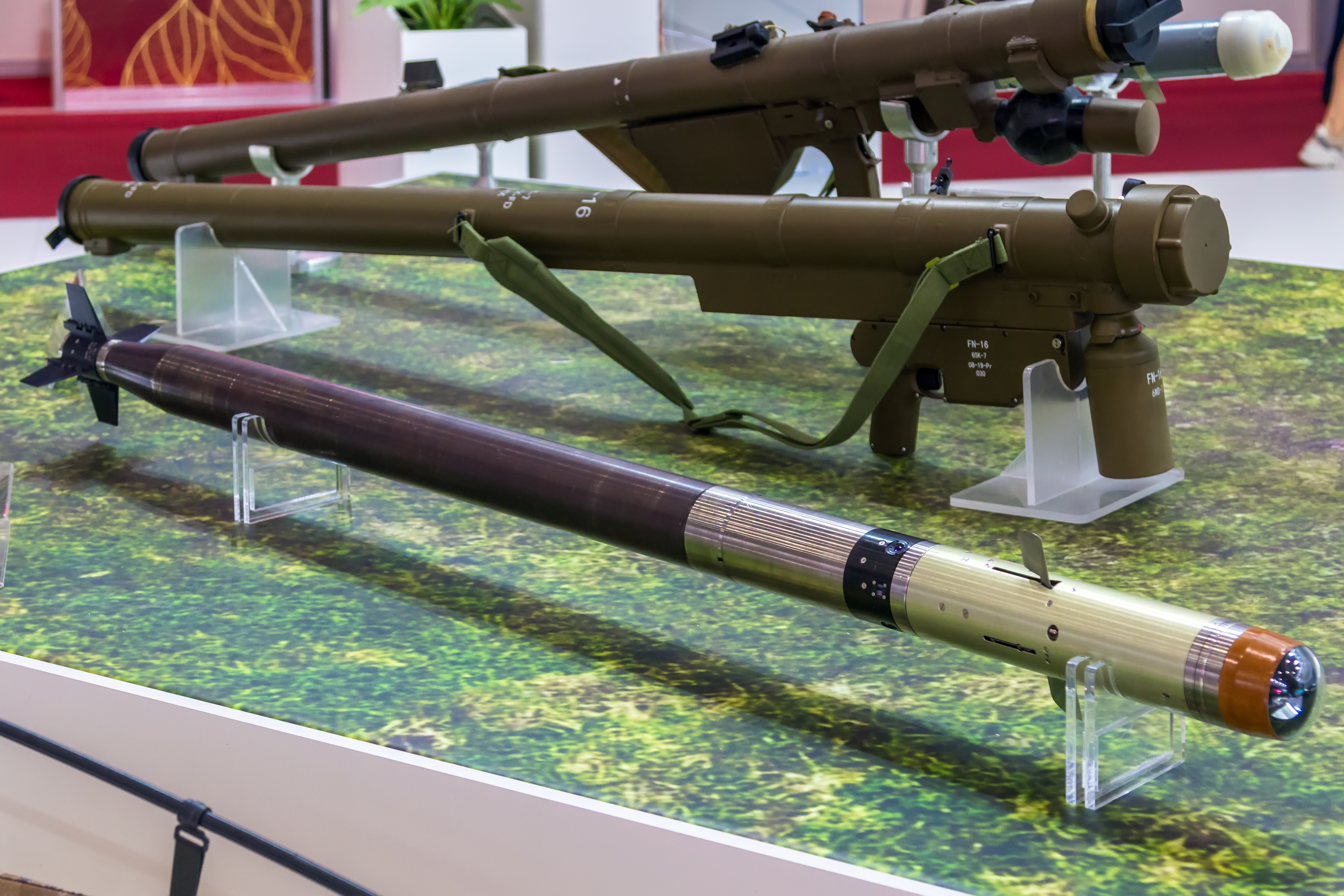
FN-16, an improved variant of FN-6

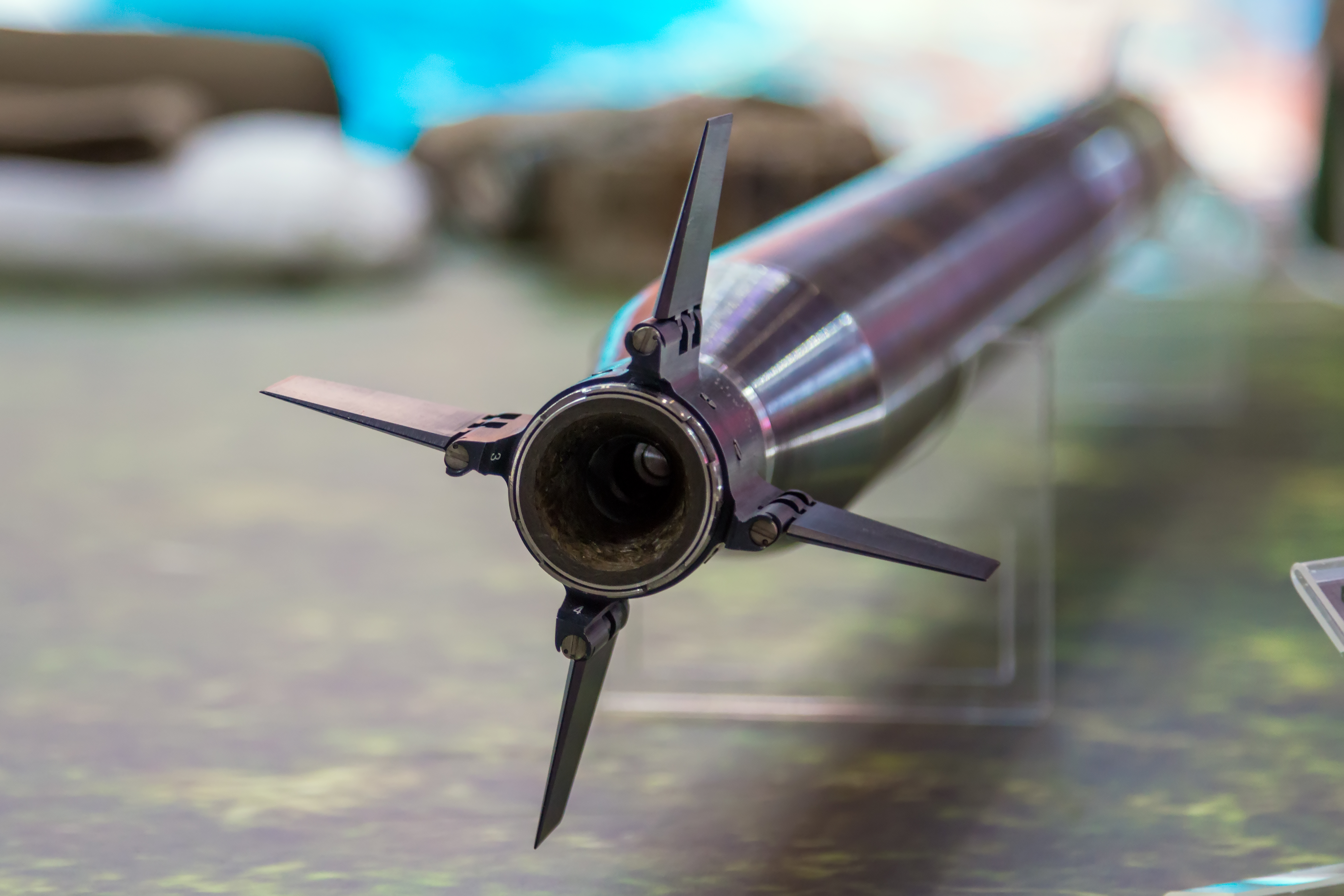
Rocket motor and rear control fins of the FN-16

The HN-6B (Chinese: 红缨-6B; pinyin: hóng yīng-Liù B; lit. 'red tassel-6B'), export designation FN-16 (Chinese: 飞弩-16; pinyin: Fēi Nú-16; lit. 'Flying Crossbow-16') is an upgraded variant of the HN-6/FN-6. The FN-16/HN-6B features a major design change. The missile no longer has the pyramid-shaped seeker nose. The FN-6 utilizes a multi-element infrared guidance system. The FN-16 features an infrared/ultraviolet quasi-imaging guidance system that operates simultaneously across both IR and UV wavebands. Combined with a rosette scanning pattern, the FN-16 outperforms the FN-6 in both resolution and electronic counter-countermeasure (anti-jamming) capabilities.

== Further developments ==
=== FN-6A ===
FN-6A is the vehicle-mounted version of FN-6, first revealed to the public in 2005. The system is based on a Dongfeng EQ2050, weighing 4.6 tons in total. A one-man turret is sandwiched between two quadruple launchers, and the electro-optical fire control system (FCS) with IR, laser, and TV sensors. Contrary to the common arrangements on similar systems, the FCS of FN-6A is mounted under the launchers. Due to space limitations, the FCS is distributed between two places, one portion under one launcher and the other portion in the opposite launcher across the turret. A 12.7 mm (0.50 in) heavy machine gun is added for additional protection. The vehicle is operated by a two-man crew, one driver and one weapon system operator. Communication gear and land navigation gear are standard. The modular design of the system enables other subsystems to be incorporated easily, such as IFF. The auxiliary power unit provides enough power for the system to operate continuously for more than 8 hours.

The FCS of the FN-6A can lock on to a target 10 km (6.2 mi) away, and the reaction time is less than 5 seconds. Each vehicle can fight independently, but can be integrated with others to fight as a coherent unit by incorporating a command vehicle that is also based on the same vehicle chassis. The command vehicle provides a light, solid-state passive phased array radar to increase situational awareness and can direct up to 8 launching vehicles simultaneously. A command vehicle and 8 launching vehicles form an air defense company when fighting as a coherent unit, and this in turn can be integrated into larger air defense networks. Alternatively, the launching vehicle can be directly integrated into larger air defense networks without the need for the command vehicle.

Each launch vehicle requires a support vehicle for resupply, and the support vehicle is also based on Dongfeng EQ2050 to reduce logistic costs. Each supply vehicle carries 24 missiles, and reloading each missile takes less than a minute. Similar to the M1097 Avenger, each launcher is designed so that each missile can also be removed and fired manually by a soldier, like a regular MANPAD. Although effective against supersonic aircraft, for UAVs and missiles, the maximum target speed is limited to 300 meters per second.

=== FB-6A ===
The FB-6A is a vehicle-based air defense system mounting FN-6 missiles. When carrying the FN-16 missiles, the system is known as the FB-6C.

The earlier FN-6A did not enter mass production and served only in very limited numbers in Chinese forces, mainly for trial purposes. In the subsequent Zhuhai Airshows, followed by its original debut, FN-6A is replaced by its successor FB-6A, which did see greater numbers in service with Chinese forces. The general designer of the FB-6A system is Mr. Wei Zhigang (卫志刚), rumored also to be the general designer of FN-6A, the predecessor of FB-6A. The main difference between FN-6A and its successor FB-6A is that the SAM system is broken down into two portions in the latter, as opposed to a single unit in the former: FB-6A SAM system consists of two vehicles, one carrying the engagement radar, while the other carrying the missile. The search/engagement radar of FB-6A is planar array, and can be folded down in transit, but the developer has not revealed whether the radar itself is a phased array or not. However, the developer did claim that both the mechanically scanned planar array and the electronically scanned passive phased array are available upon the customer's request. But it's not clear which one is in service with Chinese forces.

The missile launching platform of FB-6A differs from its predecessor in that both the 12.7 mm (0.50 in) heavy machine (HMG) for self-protection and the electro-optical fire control sight on that of FN-6A are removed, but a backup operator console is incorporated with bulletproof glass added between the launchers, though the FB-6A system can be operated with the vehicle. The HMG can be added as an option or changed to other machine guns. The total number of missiles carried by the launching vehicle of FB-6A remains the same as that of FN-6A, which is eight.

An upgraded version FB-6C, was unveiled at the 2016 Zhuhai Airshow. In March 2024 the Namibian Army displayed the FB-6A System in Windhoek as part of its independence celebrations.

=== FN-16 ===
At the 7th Zhuhai Airshow held at the end of 2008, China revealed a new addition to the FN series, FN-16. The FN-16 is an improvement of the earlier FN-6, with better all-aspect attack capability and better resistance against electronic countermeasures. Another major improvement is in its seeker, which, in addition to the original IR guidance, also incorporates UV guidance.

On 29 July 2026, sources announced that Iran will get between 300 and 400 man-portable air defence systems, including Chinese-made FN-16 missiles, in the following weeks, with Pakistan playing a role in the weapons delivery during the 2026 Iran war.

=== HN-6 ===
The HN-6 is the Chinese military service version of the FN-6.

It was called HY-6 when first revealed, but later changed to HN-6.

HN-6 is a further development of FN-6.

=== HN-6B ===
HN-6B is the FN-16 variant in Chinese military service.

=== FN-M ===
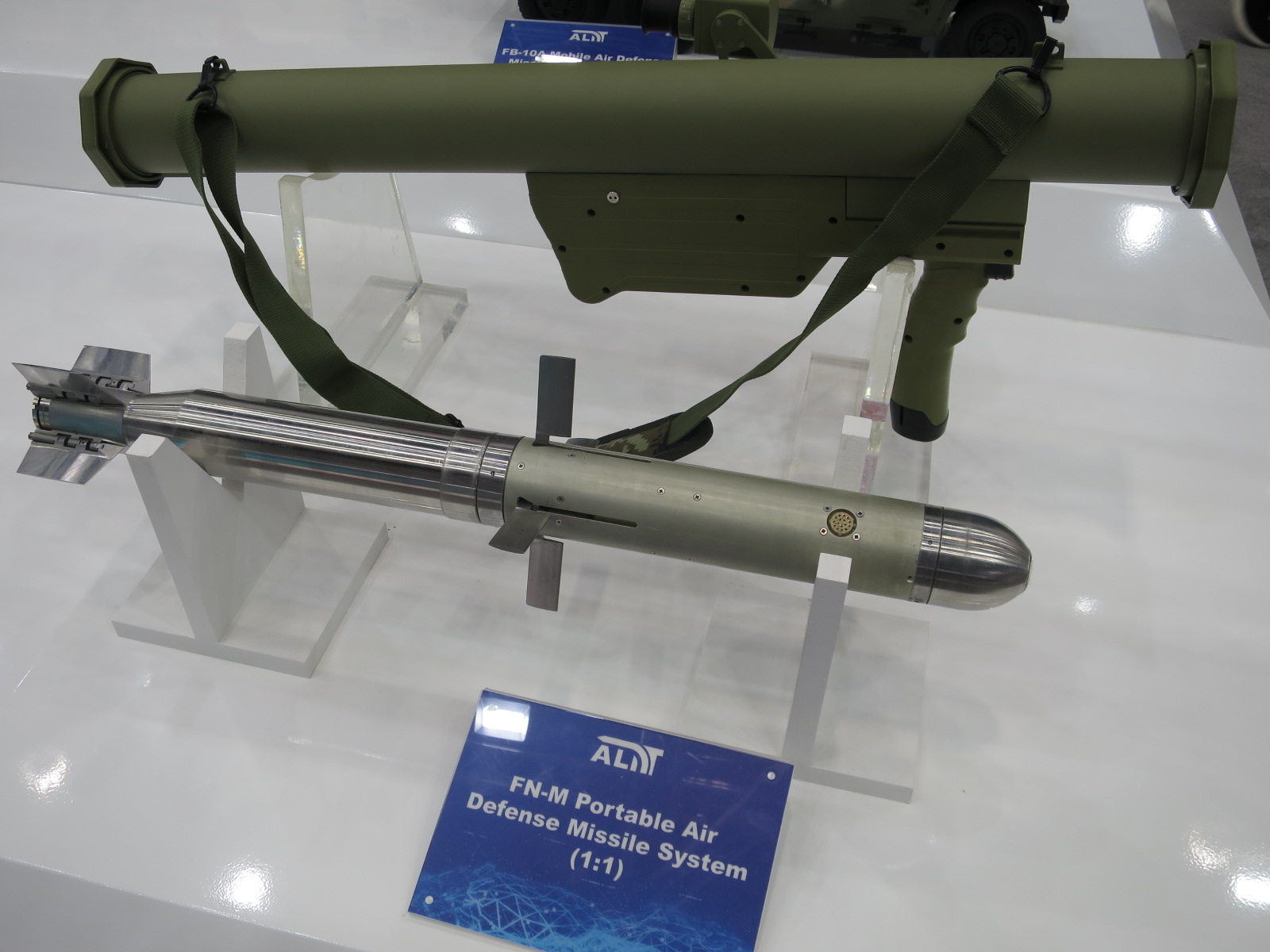
FN-M displayed at the IDEX 2023

The FN-M Hidden Blade is a multi-purpose, lightweight, micro missile in the FN series. The missile is designed to engage light vehicles, boats, fortifications, and helicopters at 3 km (1.9 mi) away, as well as small unmanned aerial vehicles (UAV) at 1.5 km (0.93 mi). The missile weighs 4 kg (8.8 lb) with a high-explosive fragmentation warhead of 1 kg (2.2 lb). The seeker is a TV imaging type. Micro missiles, such as FN-M, QN-202, and JK-1, were revealed at approximately the same time, indicating they were part of a Chinese military development program.

== Operational history ==
=== Syrian Civil War ===
The combat debut of the FN-6 came during the 2013 phase of the Syrian civil war. By March 2013, two Syrian Air Force Mil Mi-8 or Mi-17 were shot down.

The New York Times reported that Qatar supplied the Syrian rebels, possibly through purchase from the Sudanese inventory, with the FN-6 and that several units have now fallen into the hands of ISIS. However, spray paint had been used to obscure serial numbers in an effort to impede tracking of the weapon's supply chain.

The Global Times, states that, though Chinese-made missiles have downed aircraft in the past, the Syrian war "is the first time such a success has been recorded on video." The news outlet further raises the possibility of this improving the sales and image of Chinese defense products abroad. However, The New York Times reported that rebels have complained about the missile's performance, such as failings to fire or lock on and two premature explosions while firing, which killed two rebels and wounded four more.

On 18 August 2013, the first recorded kill of a fixed-wing aircraft took place when a team from the Islamic Harakat Ahrar ash-Sham Al Islami brigade downed a SyAAF MiG-21 over Latakia province. The jet's pilot was filmed parachuting, but his fate is not known. This downing is also the FN-6's first jet kill.

=== ISIL in Iraq ===
In the aftermath of the 2014 ISIL offensive in Iraq, on 3 October, an FN-6 allegedly supplied by Qatar was used by the militant group to shoot down an Iraqi Army Mil Mi-35 attack helicopter near Baiji. It also may have been used to destroy a Bell 407 scout helicopter in the same area on 8 October, killing both pilots.

=== Myanmar Civil War ===
On 16 January 2024, a Myanmar Air Force FTC-2000G light fighter was shot down by a Kachin Independence Army FN-6 missile in Shan State. Both pilots were killed.

=== Russo-Ukrainian War ===
According to a statement from the 143rd Joint Training Center Podillia the unit downed a Kalibr cruise missile in November 2025 with FN-6. Ukraine has also released images of the FN-16 being operated by the 160th Mechanized Brigade.

== Variants ==
=== Man-portable ===
FN-6
original MANPADS variant
HN-6
domestic MANPADS variant based on FN-6 in the People's Liberation Army (PLA) service.
FN-16
improved MANPADS variant based on FN-6. Also called HN-9BE.
HN-6B
demostic MANPADS variant based on FN-16 in the People's Liberation Army (PLA) service.
FN-M
micro missile variant

=== Vehicle-mounted ===
FN-6A
Vehicle-mounted air defense system that mounts 8 FN-6 missiles.
FB-6A
Vehicle-mounted air defense system that mounts FN-6 missiles with separate radar and missile vehicles.
FB-6C
Improved FB-6A. vehicle-mounted air defense system that mounts FN-16 missiles.
PGZ-04A
Four FN-6 missiles are mounted on the upgraded Type 95 SPAAA.

=== Others ===
FN-16J
Remote-controlled stationary air-defense system using FN-16 missiles.

== Operators ==
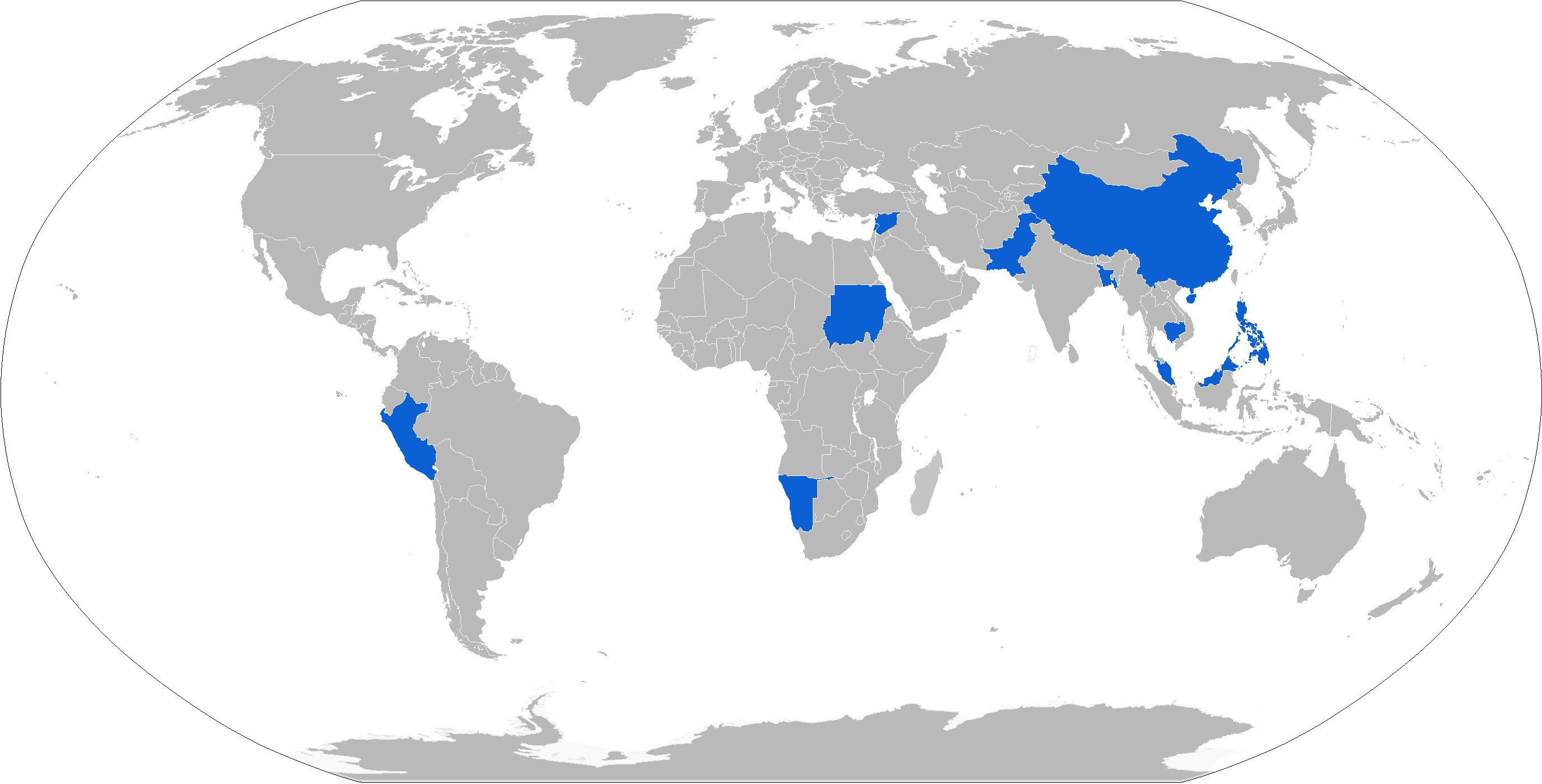
Map with FN-6 operators in blue

- Bangladesh: Bangladesh Army uses FN16 variant.
- Cameroon
- Cambodia: On 25 June 2009, the National Television of Cambodia (TVK) showed Cambodian soldiers with FN-6 and FN-16 missiles to be deployed near the Thai-Cambodian border in the 2008 Cambodian-Thai stand-off.
- China: The FN-6 has been taken into service with the PLAGF and PLAAF. In PLAAF, the FN-6 is deployed in various ground-to-air missile units to provide extra layer of air defence, and to protect high value weaponry from enemy's low-fly aircraft or weapons. In many PLAAF live firing exercise, FN-6s were seen to participate in action.
- Ghana: 100 FN-6 missiles delivered on 2016.
- Malaysia: The CNPMIEC offered to sell FN-6 missiles to Malaysia for purchasing the KSA-1A medium range surface-to-air missiles. In May 2004, a memorandum of understanding was signed with Malaysia for the transfer of technology of the FN-6.
- Namibia: First spotted in Namibian service in 2016, confirmed in August 2018. 50 speculated to be in service.
- Pakistan: 806 FN-6 delivered between 2010 and 2016. 1,191 FN-16 delivered between 2018 and 2021.
- Peru: A small batch of FN-6 missiles was acquired by the Peruvian Navy in July 2009 for US$1.1 million
- Qatar
- Sudan: displayed at Sudan's Independence Day military parade of 2007. Produced as the "Nayzak".
- Syria: Captured from rebel groups.
- Ukraine: According to a statement from the 143rd Joint Training Center Podillia, the unit downed a Kalibr cruise missile in November 2025 with FN-6. Photos of FN-16 usage by the Armed Forces of Ukraine were also spotted.

=== Non-state actors ===
- Kurdistan - used by The Peshmerga
- (Syria) Free Syrian Army
- Islamic State
- Kachin Independence Army: Allegedly received and used some from the UWSA.
- Ta'ang National Liberation Army
- United Wa State Army: Reportedly acquired in 2012 as part of an efforts to improve its anti-aircraft capabilities

== Specifications ==
HN-6 series missile specifications
| | HN-6 (FN-6) | HN-6B (FN-16) |
|---|---|---|
| Introduction | 2000 | |
| Missile length | 1.495 m (4.90 ft) | ≤1.6 m (5.2 ft) |
| System length | | ≤1.7 m (5.6 ft) |
| Missile weight | 10.77 kg (23.7 lb) | ≤11.5 kg (25 lb) |
| System weight | 16 kg (35 lb) | ≤18 kg (40 lb) |
| Missile diameter | 72 mm (2.8 in) | 72 mm (2.8 in) |
| Missile wingspan | 0.18 m (0.59 ft) | |
| Warhead | HE-Fragmentation | HE-Frag |
| Warhead size | | 2.5 kg (5.5 lb) |
| Fuze | Proximity fuse | Laser proximity fuse |
| Seeker | Multi-element passive infra-red homing | Dual-spectrum infrared/ultraviolet (IR/UV) with rosette scanning quasi-imaging guidance |
| Seeker range | | 10 km (6.2 mi) |
| Flight speed | 600 m/s (Mach 1.8) | 600 m/s (Mach 1.8) (cruise); 750 m/s (Mach 2.2) (maximum) |
| Target speed | 300 m/s (Mach 0.88) (oncoming); 360 m/s (Mach 1.1) (receding) | |
| G load | 18G | ≧18G |
| Range | 0.5–5.5 km (0.31–3.42 mi) | 0.5–6.5 km (0.31–4.04 mi) |
| Altitude | 15–3,800 m (49–12,467 ft) | 10–4,500 m (33–14,764 ft) |

== See also ==
- QW missile, the other Chinese MANPADS series
- 9K38 Igla – (Soviet Union)
- Anza – (Pakistan)
- Misagh-3 – (Iran)
- Mistral – (France)
- RBS 70 – (Sweden)
- Sungur – (Turkey)
- Starstreak – (United Kingdom)
