= QW =

QW may refer to:

== Airlines ==
- Qingdao Airlines, China (founded 2014; IATA:QW)
- Blue Wings, Germany (2002–2012; IATA:QW)

== Computing ==
- qw() operator, in Perl
- QWERTY, a keyboard layout

== Entertainment and media ==
- QuakeWorld, a 1996 video game build
- QueerWeek, an unpublished New York magazine project
- Enemy Territory: Quake Wars, a 2007 video game

== Other uses ==
- Quantum well, in quantum physics and materials science
- Quo warranto, a legal writ
- QW missile, a man-portable air-defense systems
- QW-2 MANPADS, Chinese man-portable infrared homing surface-to-air missile
