= Mistral (missile) =

French short range air defense system

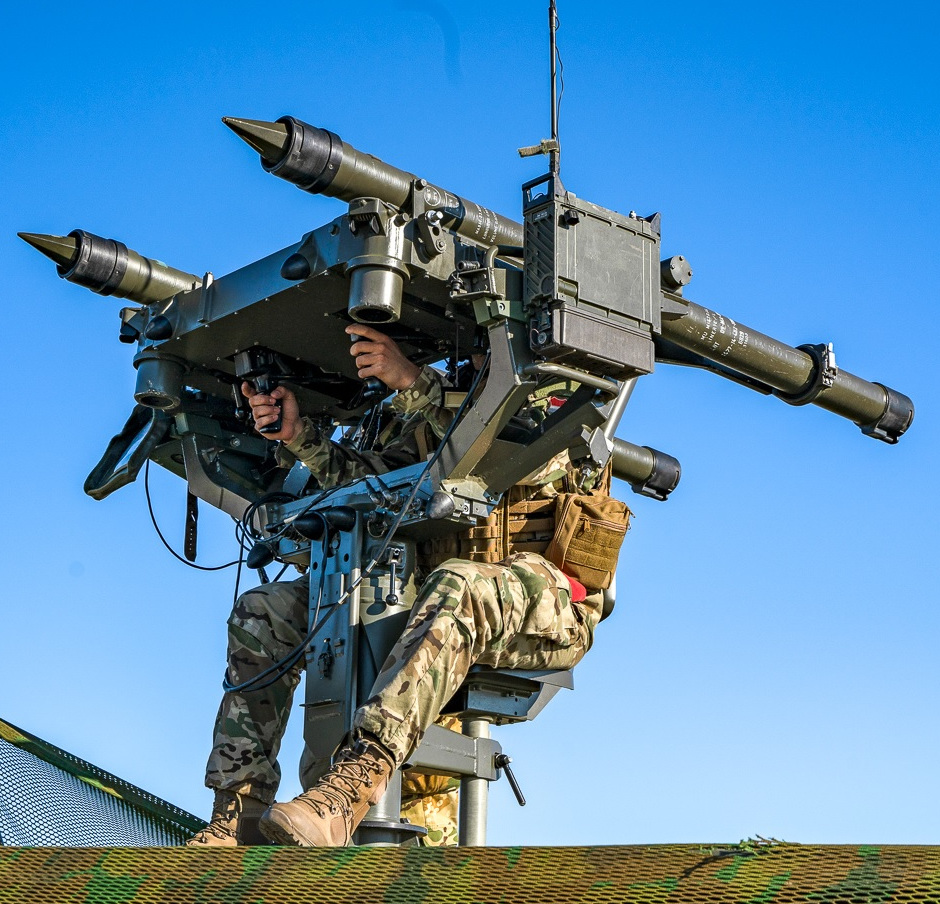
- A Mistral ATLAS double launcher of the Hungarian Armed Forces
- Type: SHORAD; SAM-based CIWS (ship-based remotely controlled Mistral-3 variants); Very short-range air-to-air missile (Mistral ATAM)
- Place of origin: France

Service history
- In service: 1990–present
- Used by: See Operators
- Wars: Second Congo War; Russian invasion of Ukraine

Production history
- Designer: Matra Défense (now merged into MBDA)
- Designed: 1974 onwards
- Manufacturer: MBDA France
- Unit cost: Mistral 3: US$545,600 (2024)

Specifications
- Mass: 19.7 kg (43.4 lb)
- Length: 1.86 m (6.1 ft); 1.88m (6.16 ft) (including initial booster)
- Diameter: 90 mm (3.5 in)
- Crew: 1
- Effective firing range: 8 km (4.97 mi, 4.31 nm) (Mistral 3)
- Warhead: High Explosive with high density tungsten balls
- Warhead weight: 2.95 kg (6.5 lb)
- Detonation mechanism: Laser proximity or impact triggered
- Engine: Solid Rocket Motor, 2-stage
- Flight ceiling: 6 km (19,685 ft) (Mistral 3)
- Maximum speed: 930 m/s (2,080 mph), approx. Mach 2.71 (high supersonic)
- Guidance system: Infrared homing

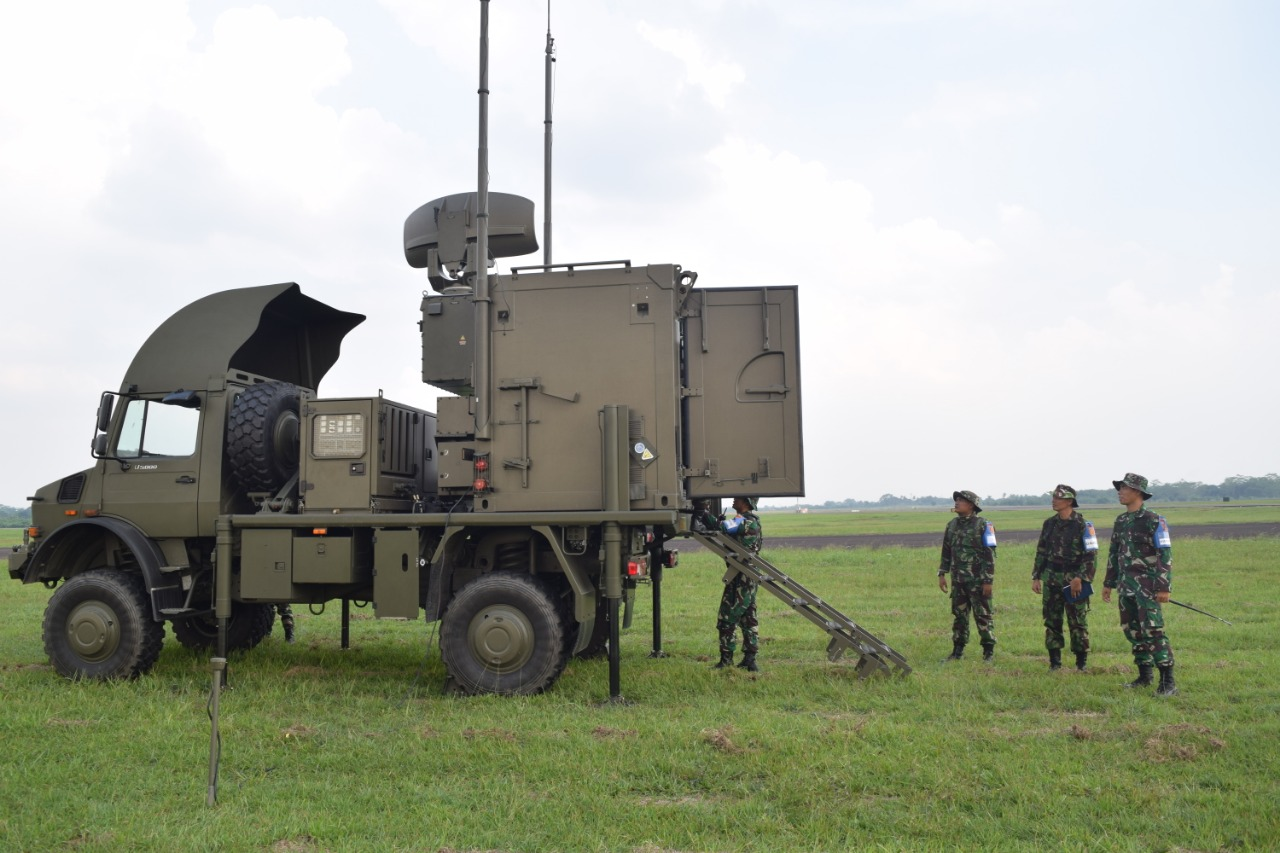
Mistral Coordination Post (MCP) with Oerlikon Contraves SHORAR.

The Missile Transportable Anti-aérien Léger (English: Transportable lightweight anti-air missile), commonly called Mistral, is a family of French infrared homing multipurpose short range air defense system manufactured by MBDA France (formerly by Matra Défense and then Matra BAe Dynamics). Based on the French SATCP ('Sol-Air à Très Courte Portée'), the development of the portable system that would later become the Mistral began in 1974. The first version of the system was introduced in 1990 (Mistral 1), the second in 1998 (Mistral 2), and the third in 2013 (Mistral 3).

== Description ==
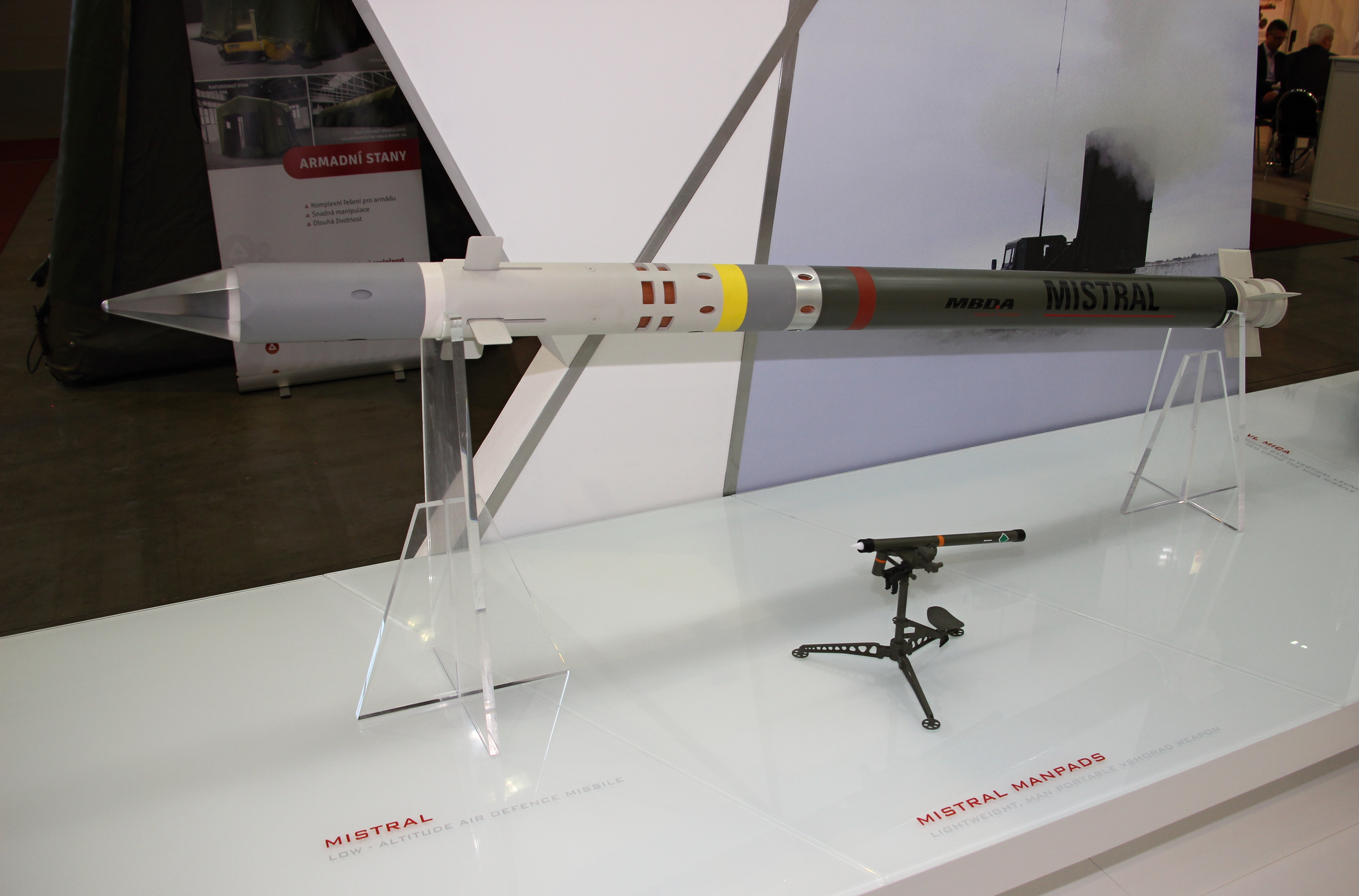
Mistral missile on display

Mistral is a short-range air defence (SHORAD) missile system that can be used from vehicles, surface ships, and helicopters, as well as in a portable configuration. The "Mistral" missile is transported in a transport and launch container (MPC) together with a "friend or foe" interrogator, a power source and a tripod with its sighting devices.

They are then to be operated by a pair of crew members as the commander and the shooter. There are also launch units that allow the missile to be fired from armoured vehicles, ships or helicopters (such as the Aérospatiale Gazelle, Denel Rooivalk, or Eurocopter Tiger). To defeat flares ejected from the rear of a targeted aircraft, proportional navigation using a gyro as a reference is adopted for Mistral, rather than the pursuit method employed in earlier IR-guided MANPADS. To further enhance the ECCM capability, the seeker of Mistral has a very narrow field of view to reject decoys and interference, the seeker can tilt in the range of +/− 38 degrees. On the launcher, the missile runs up the gyro in 2 seconds, and total reaction time is 5 seconds. The all-aspect two-color (2–4 and 3–5 μm) cooled IR-seeker of Mistral is developed by SAT (Societe Anonyme de Telecommunications), and the missile adopts both laser proximity and impact fuzes.

The MCP (Mistral Coordination Post) was first shown at the 1991 Paris Air Show fitted with SHORAR (Short-range Anti-aircraft Defence Radar) from Oerlikon Contraves. The MCP is designed to be used with a portable Mistral system, ATLAS, ALBI or MPCV systems and also used as part of MBDA Mistral missile Ground Based Air Defence (GBAD) systems for air defense of military units and important facilities.

The MCP provides target designation and fire control for eleven Mistral firing unit, ALBI, ATLAS or MPCV air defence systems. The MCP is mounted on a truck chassis or any other off-road chassis. The newer version of MCP are called the IMCP or Improved Missile Control Post.

A close-in weapon system based on Mistral is a six-missile version called Sadral, with a stabilized rapid-reload launcher that is fully automated. A CSEE developed fire control director is integrated to the launcher, consisted of TV camera and FLIR. Image produced by both directors appear on the screen in the operator console below deck, and the missiles are locked onto the target before being launched. A fully loaded Sadral launcher weighs 1080 kg, and the operator console weighs 280 kg. A two-missile unit installed on ships is called Simbad, and a newly launched four-missile version is called Tetral. An evolution of the Simbad is now proposed: Simbad RC. Both Tetral and Simbad RC are remote controlled from the ship's deck while the original Simbad is manually operated with a simple optical sight.

== History ==
Mistral missiles used by the Rwandan forces in the Second Congo War shot down a Zimbabwean Air Force BAE Hawk fighter on 23 March 1999.

Two automated SADRAL launchers (re-cycled from the retiring Georges Leygues-class frigates) and each equipped with six Mistral Mk 3 surface-to-air missiles were fitted to three La Fayette-class frigates of the French Navy in the 2021–2023 period. The system replaced the previous Crotale system in order to provide a modernized defence against sea-skimming targets.

The Mistral Mk 3 carries an infrared imaging seeker and possesses advanced image processing capabilities. This allows it to engage low thermal signature targets such as: UAVs, turbojet-powered missiles and fast craft at long range, while reportedly offering resistance to countermeasures. The system is also carried on the aircraft carrier Charles de Gaulle, the Mistral-class amphibious assault ships and (SIMBAD-RC) is being installed on the French Navy's Jacques Chevallier-class support ships.

Two Sadral turrets for Mistral were also installed on the raised deck on each side of the helicopter hangar of the former Cassard-class frigates. Space for the SADRAL/Mistral system is also provided for on the French Horizon-class frigates, and as of 2025, is to be fit to these vessels, as well as to all French Aquitaine and FDI-class frigates.

Norway sent 100 Mistral systems to Ukraine shortly after the start of the Russian invasion of Ukraine. In response to the need for faster weapon shipments as a result of the war, in early 2023 MBDA started accelerating production of the Mistral 3 from 20 to 30 missiles per month, and to 40 per month by late 2023.

== Variants ==
The Mistral entered production in 1989 and is now deployed in various forms by 37 armed forces of 25 countries including Austria, the Brazilian Marine Corps, Chile, Colombia, Cyprus, Ecuador, Estonia, Finland, France, Hungary, Indonesia, Morocco, New Zealand, Oman, Pakistan, Philippines, South Korea, Singapore, Spain, and Venezuela. Norway donated their complete stock of Mistral missiles in 2022 to Ukraine.

=== Land system ===
- MANPADS: Basic Mistral missile used with a man-portable launch unit, manually operated.
- ALAMO: Mistral missile mount with single missile, used on light vehicles, manually operated.
- ALBI: Mounting system with 2 Mistral missiles. It is used on wheeled, or lightly armored vehicles, manually operated.
- ATLAS: Improved ground or vehicle based mount with 2 Mistral missiles, manually operated.
- ATLAS RC: Further development of ATLAS system, remotely operated.
- ASPIC: Mounting for light vehicle with 4 Mistral missiles, remotely operated.
- MPCV: Turret for light vehicle with 4 Mistral missiles and single cannon or heavy machinegun, automatic fire control with EO system.
- PAMELA: Mistral missile mount with single missile, used on VLRA or TRM 2000 trucks, manually operated.
- SANTAL: Turret for armored vehicles with 6 Mistral missiles, automatic fire control with search radar.

=== Naval system ===
- SIMBAD: Mistral missile mount system with 2 missiles, manually operated.
- SIMBAD RC: Development of regular SIMBAD system, remotely operated.
- TETRAL: Mounting system with 4 Mistral missiles, automatic fire control with FCR or EO system.
- SADRAL: Mount with 6 Mistral missiles, automatic fire control with FCR or EO system.
- SIGMA: Combination of 25 or 30mm autocannon and 3 Mistral missiles, automatic fire control with FCR or EO system.
- SAKO M85 Mistral: Naval turret with 6 Mistral missiles based on Finland SAKO 23 M85, remotely operated.
- SPIMM: Self-contained mount for use aboard otherwise unarmed ships. Derived from SIMBAD RC

=== Airborne system ===
- ATAM: Helicopter version used as an air-to-air weapon with 2 missiles on each module.

=== Submarine air defence system ===
- On 26 September 2012 DCNS at the company's Le Mourillon plant announced plans to design and build a submarine canister-based air defence weapon based on the Mistral. The concept is similar to the British Submarine Launched Airflight Missile developed by Vickers in the 1970s and tested on HMS Aeneas and three boats of the Gal class.

== Operators ==
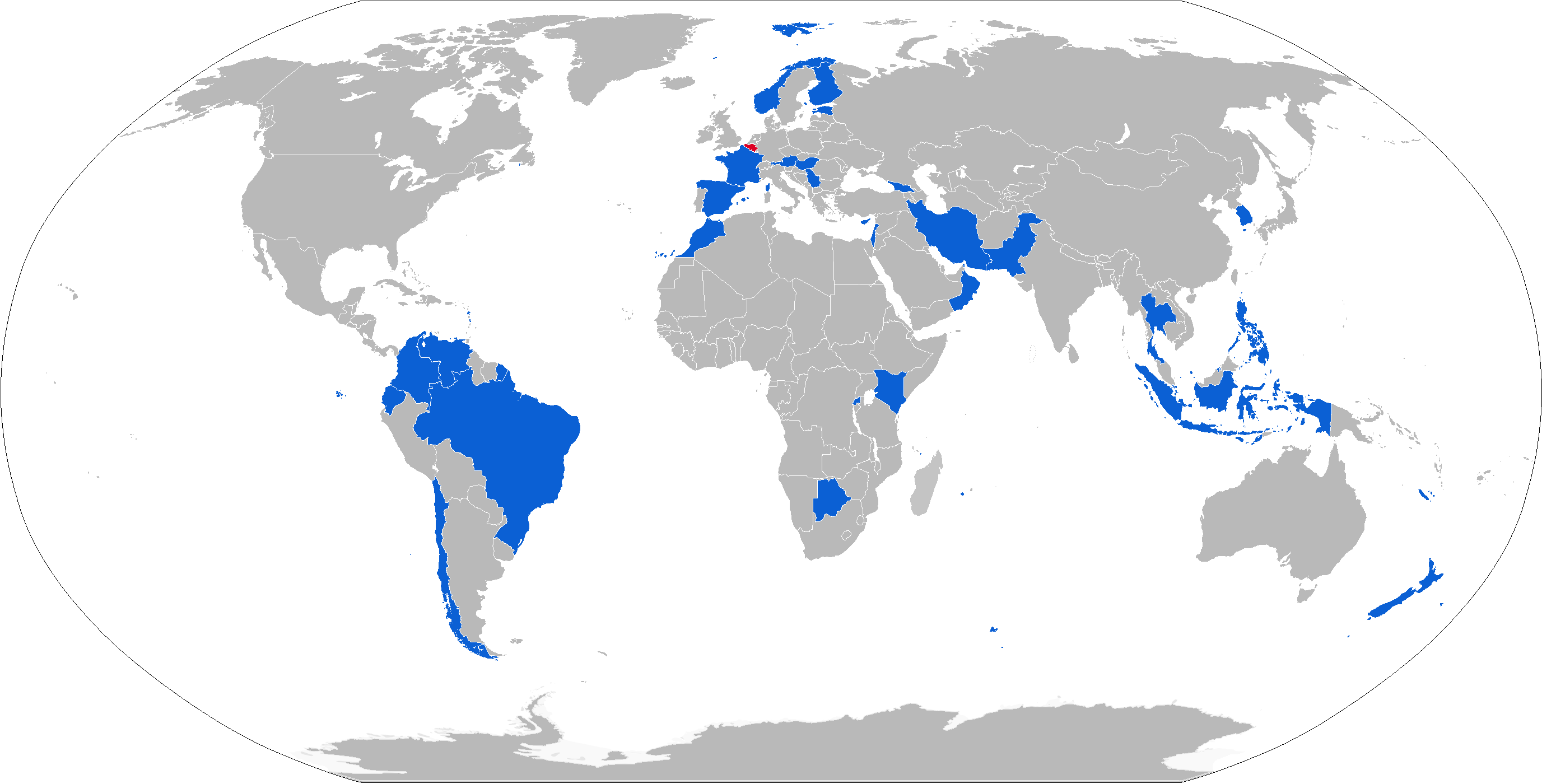
Map with Mistral operators in blue

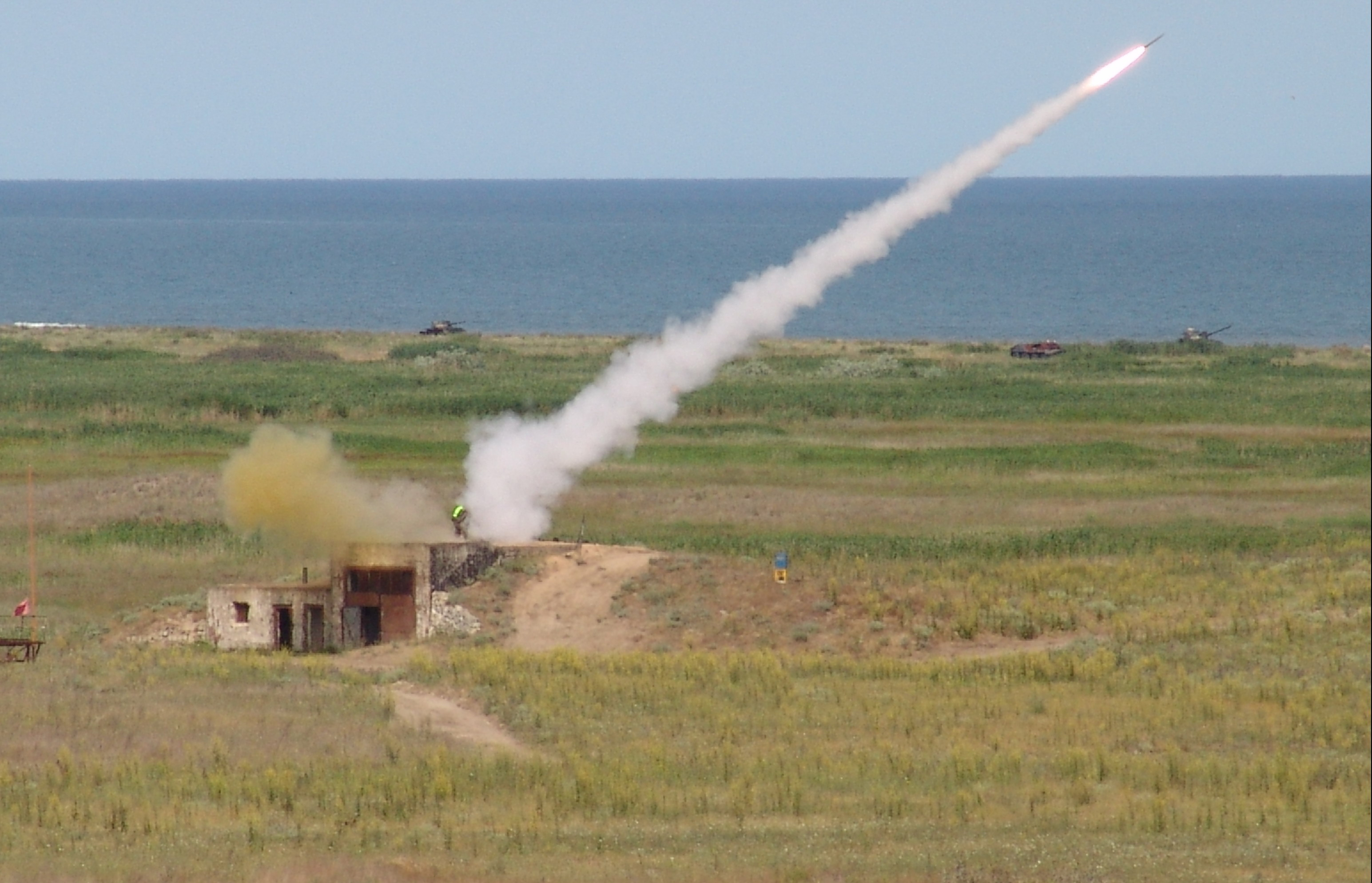
Mistral missile launch during a joint French-Romanian military exercise. (Capu Midia firing range)

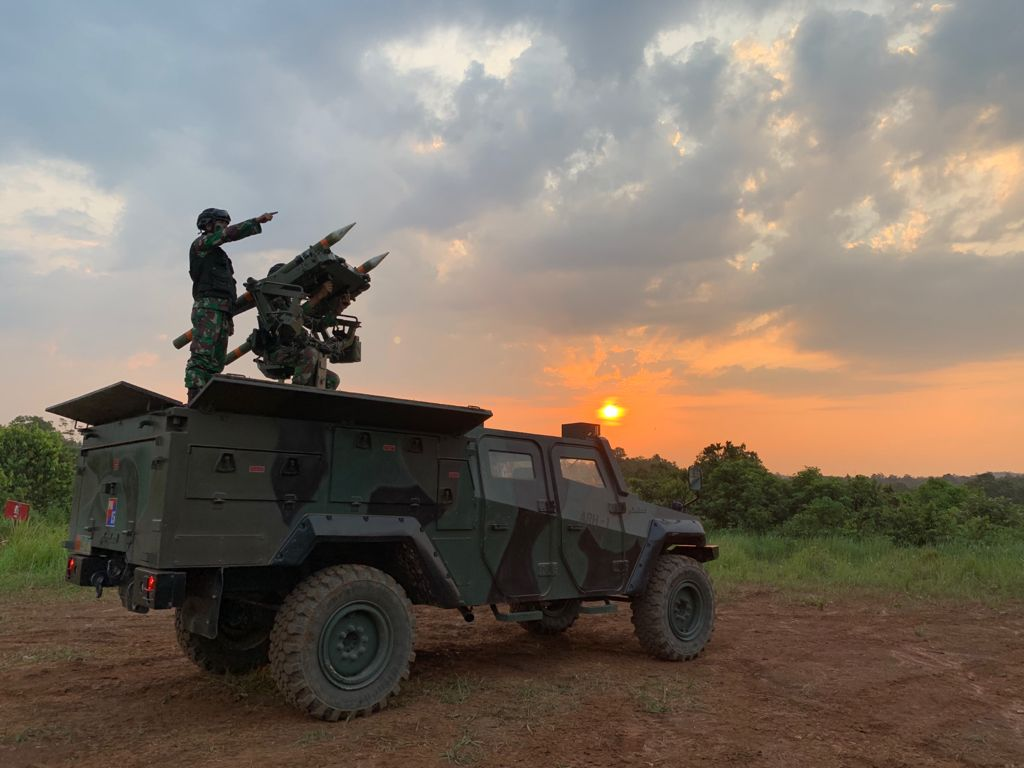
Indonesian army air defense battalion Mistral ATLAS unit during exercise

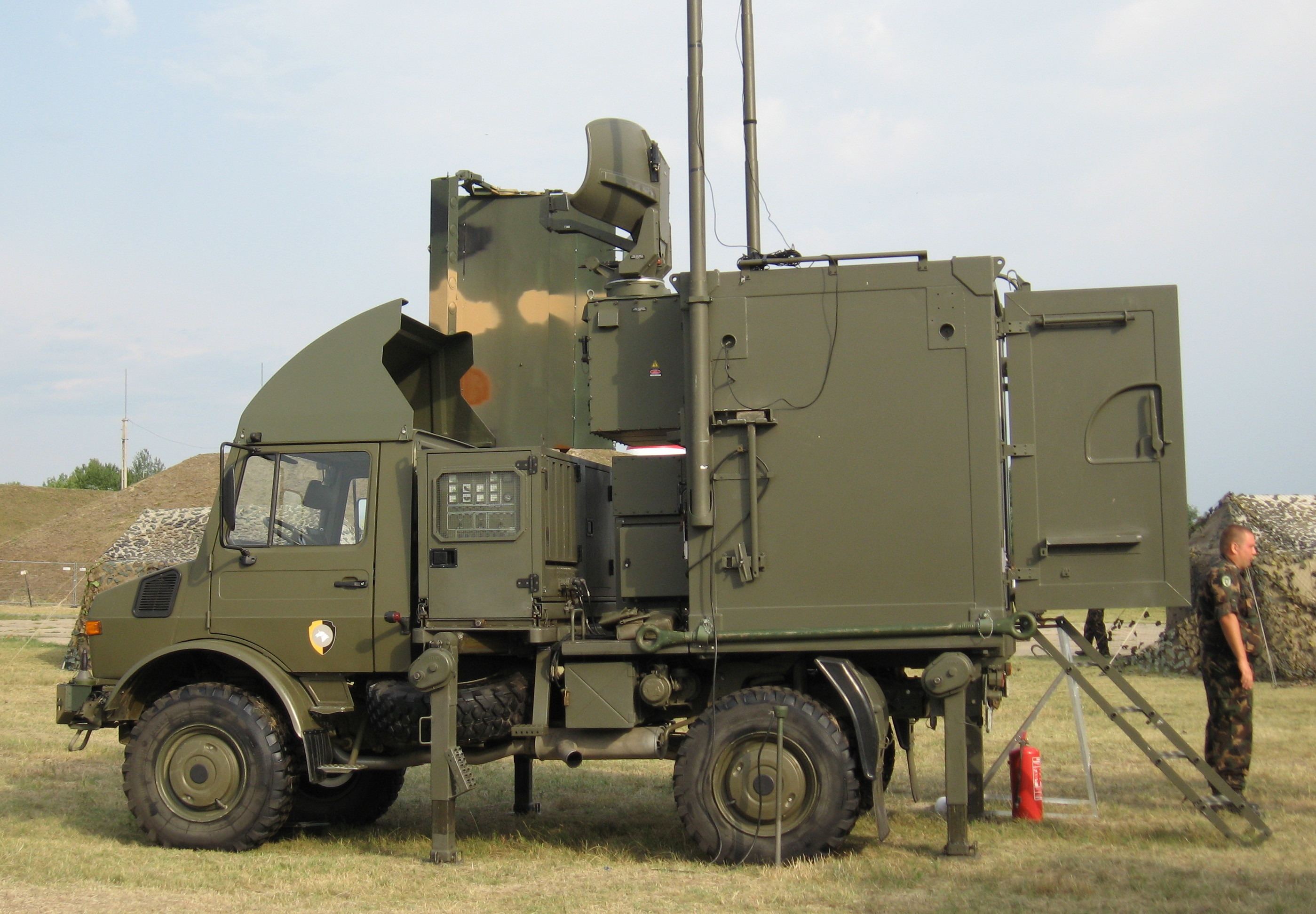
Hungarian Army MCP with SHORAR on display

=== Current operators ===
- Austria
- Botswana
- Brazil
- Brunei
- Chile
- Colombia
- Croatia
- Cyprus
- Ecuador
- Estonia
- France
- Georgia
- Hungary
- Indonesia
- India: Used as air-to-air missiles for HAL Prachand and HAL Rudra attack helicopters.
- Kenya
- Lebanon
- Morocco
- Norway: Used on Skjold-class corvettes
- Oman
- Pakistan
- Philippines
- Rwanda
- Saudi Arabia
- Serbia
- South Africa: used on Denel Rooivalk, 2 per plylon.
- Singapore
- Republic of Korea: First contract consists of 406 launchers and 2,760 missiles.
- Spain
- Thailand
- Ukraine: Delivered by France and Norway as military aid in anticipation of and during the 2022 Russian invasion.
- Venezuela

=== Future operators ===
- Armenia: French Defence Minister Sébastien Lecornu announced that Armenia had signed a letter of intent for procuring "Mistral-type" missiles.
- Belgium: Will implement & activate after earlier phase-out
- Denmark: Purchased as part of the European EDIRPA program
- North Macedonia
- Romania: Purchased as part of the EDIRPA program, second order through SAFE loans with 231 launchers and 934 Mistral 3 missiles
- Slovenia

=== Former operators ===
- Finland (Was used on Rauma class missile boat but was removed after modernization)
- New Zealand - 12 launchers and 24 missiles purchased in 1997. Retired without ever becoming fully operational in 2012. (not listed among current New Zealand Army equipment by IISS Military Balance 2017)

== See also ==
- Anza – (Pakistan)
- Misagh-2 – (Iran)
- Qaem – (Iran)
- FIM-92 Stinger – (United States)
- PZR Grom – (Poland)
- Starstreak – (United Kingdom)
- Sungur – (Turkey)
- 9K38 Igla – (Soviet Union)
- RBS 70 – (Sweden)
- QW-3 – (China)
