= QW-2 (missile) =

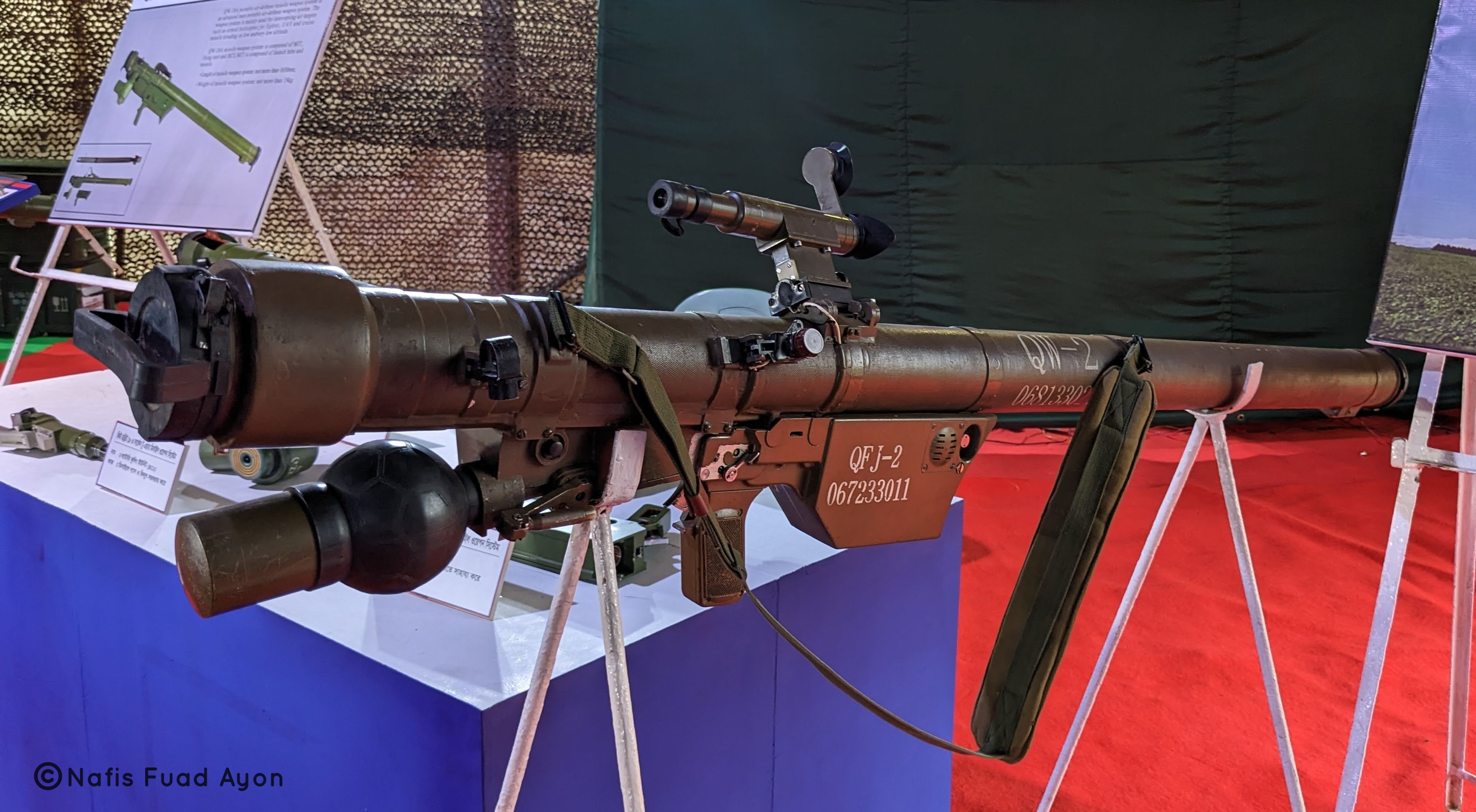
- QW-2 of the Bangladesh Army on display
- Type: Man-portable air-defense system
- Place of origin: People's Republic of China

Service history
- Used by: See Operators

Production history
- Produced: After 1998
- Variants: See Variants

Specifications
- Mass: 11.32 kg (25.0 lb)
- Length: 1.59 metres (5.2 ft)
- Diameter: 72 mm (2.8 in)
- Operational range: 0.5–6 kilometres (0.31–3.73 mi)
- Flight ceiling: 0.01–4 kilometres (0.0062–2.4855 mi)
- Guidance system: Infrared homing
- Launch platform: MANPADS; Ground vehicles

The QW-2 (NATO reporting name: CH-SA-8) is a Chinese man-portable infrared homing surface-to-air missile (SAM) MANPADS. The system has improved performance against targets flying faster and at lower-altitude than the QW-1.

== History and development ==
The QW-1 is the first missile in the QW missile series, first revealed at the 1994 Farnborough International Airshow and showcased again on the Zhuhai Airshow in 1996. The QW-1 was considered a typical "second-generation" MANDPADS on the market, roughly equivalent to the early versions of the FIM-92 Stinger. In the 1990s, Chinese engineers planned to upgrade the QW-1.

QW-2 is the third-generation improvement based on QW-1. The QW-2 was unveiled at the 1998 Zhuhai Airshow. Unlike QW-1, the QW-2 featured a new infrared filter and the true all-aspect targeting capability. It also featured a longer slant range, a lower minimal engagement altitude, and improved counter-countermeasure capability. A distinct difference of the QW-2 when compared with the previous generation missile is the drag-reducing aerospike in front of the missile seeker. CASIC claimed the QW-2 has equal or better performance than the FIM-92 Stinger and Mistral missiles.

In 2014, the CASIC revealed QW-12, an upgrade to QW-2.

== Variants ==
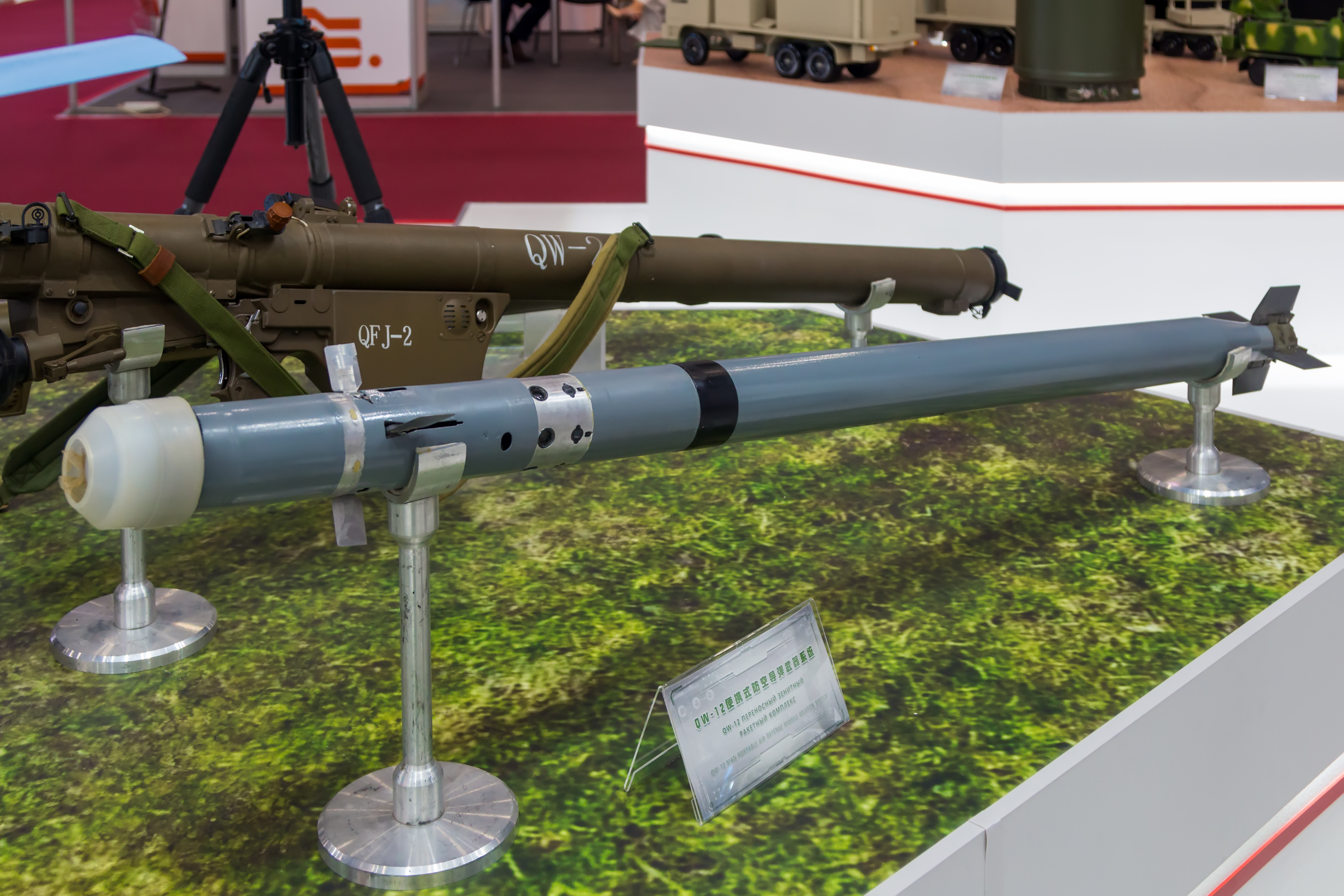
QW-12

QW-2
Development of the QW-1.

QW-12
It uses a laser proximity detonator. Unveiled in November 2014.

Anza Mk III
Pakistani copy of QW-2.

== Operators ==
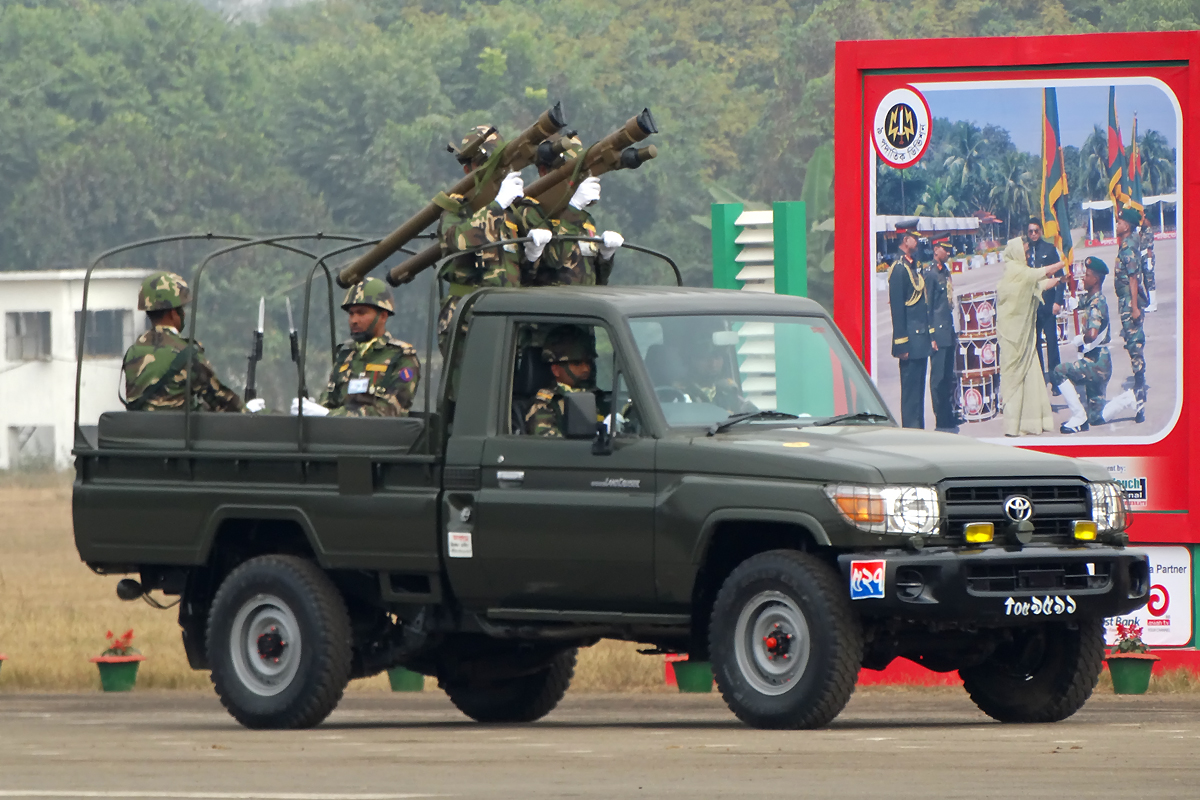
Bangladesh Army QW-2 during victory day parade

- Bangladesh
  - Bangladesh Army
- China
  - People's Liberation Army
- Turkmenistan

== Specifications ==
QW-2 missile specifications
	QW-2	QW-12
Introduction	1998	2014
Missile length	1.590 m (5.22 ft)	1.590 m (5.22 ft)
System length		1.645 m (5.40 ft)
Missile weight	11.32 kg (25.0 lb)	
System weight	18 kg (40 lb)	18.4 kg (41 lb)
Missile diameter	72 mm (2.8 in)	72 mm (2.8 in)
Warhead	1.42 kg (3.1 lb)	1.42 kg (3.1 lb)
Warhead type	HE-fragmentation (HE-Frag)	HE-Frag
Fuze	Impact and laser proximity	Impact and laser proximity
Seeker	All-aspect dual-band passive infrared (IR) seeker	Mid-infrared (Mid-IR) Dual-band passive infrared (IR) seeker
Flight speed	600 m/s (Mach 1.8)	
Range	0.5–6 km (0.31–3.73 mi)	0.5–6 km (0.31–3.73 mi)
Altitude	10–3,800 m (33–12,467 ft)	10–4,000 m (33–13,123 ft)

== See also ==
- QW missile
- 9K38 Igla
- FN-6
- Mistral
- FIM-92B

== Bibliography ==
- Kirkham, Elizabeth; Okechukwu, Nneka (2010). Controlling the Transfer of Man-Portable Air Defence Systems (PDF) (Report). Saferworld.
