= Misagh-1 =

Iranian portable surface-to-air missile

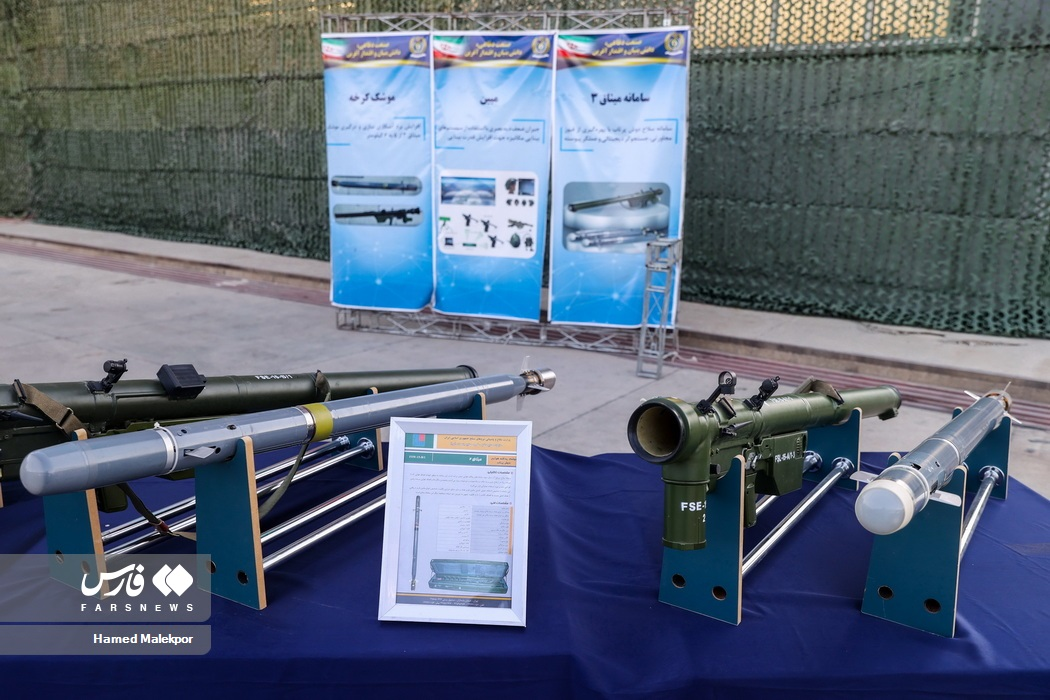
- Misagh-1 on right (note vertical battery unit).
- Type: MANPADS
- Place of origin: Iran

Production history
- Manufacturer: Shahid Shah Abhady Industrial Complex

Specifications
- Mass: 16.9 kg
- Length: 1.477 m
- Diameter: 0.71 m
- Warhead: 1.42 kg
- Detonation mechanism: Impact fuze
- Engine: solid rocket motor
- Operational range: 6 km
- Flight ceiling: 5 km
- Maximum speed: 700 m/s (Mach 2.6)
- Guidance system: Passive infrared homing
- Launch platform: Man portable

The Misagh-1 (also Mithaq-1) is an Iranian man-portable surface-to-air missile. It was developed by the Shahid Kazemi Industrial Complex in Tehran.

The MANPADS was supplemented by the newer Misagh-2 missile system.

== History ==
Iran began production of the Misagh-1 in May 1993.

The Misagh-1 was reported to be found in anti-government insurgent arms caches in Iraq. The US military has suggestions that the MANPADs found were smuggled with Iranian assistance.

== Design ==
The Misagh-1 is a variant or reverse-engineered clone of the Chinese QW-1 Vanguard.

=== Identification ===
Visually, the Misagh-1 is virtually indistinguishable from the QW-1 it is cloned from and Pakistan's Anza missile. It can be distinguished from the QW-1M/Misagh-2 and the QW-18/Misagh-3 by the Misagh-1's straight battery unit.

== Operators ==
- Iran: Used by the Iranian military.
- Syria: Supplied to the Syrian Army.

=== Non-State Actors ===
- Anti-government insurgents in Iraq
- Hamas
- Hezbollah
