= Misagh-3 =

Man-portable air-defense system

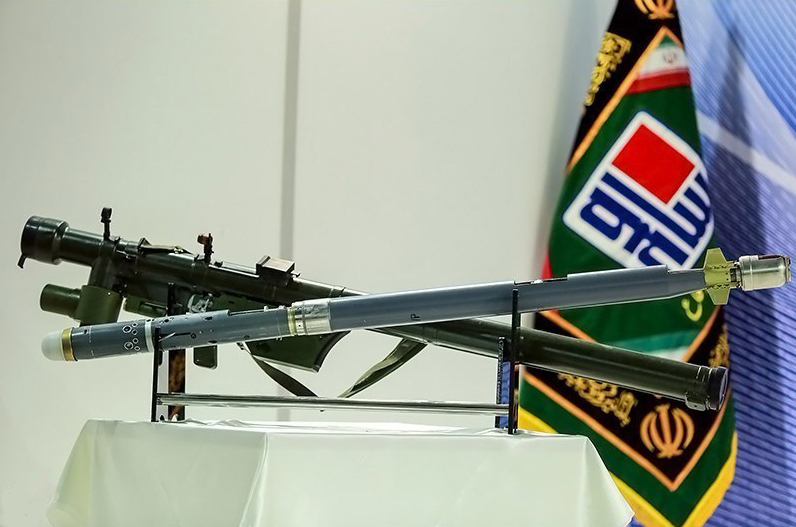
- The Misagh-3 MANPADS and missile unveiled in 2017.
- Type: MANPADS
- Place of origin: Iran

Service history
- In service: 2017–present
- Used by: Iran

Production history
- Manufacturer: Ministry of Defence and Armed Forces Logistics (Iran)
- Produced: since 6 February 2017

Specifications
- Mass: 17 kg (37 lb)
- Length: ~1.5 m (4 ft)
- Warhead: 1.5 kg (3.3 lb) FRAG-HE
- Engine: solid rocket motor
- Operational range: 6 km (5.5 mil)
- Flight altitude: 5 km
- Maximum speed: 850 m/s (Mach 2.88)
- Guidance system: Infrared homing
- Launch platform: Man portable

The Misagh-3 (Persian: موشک دوش‌پرتاب میثاق-۳) is an Iranian infrared homing short range air defense system manufactured by MODAFL of Iran and unveiled in 2017.

Misagh-3 is an upgraded version of Misagh-1 and Misagh-2 that were based on the Chinese QW-18.

== Design ==
The Misagh-3 has a range of five kilometers and a maximum flight height of 4000 meters with a maximum flight speed of 850 m/s (2.88 Mach) and a 1.4 kilograms of high-explosion warhead.

To deal with the thermal disruptor (flare) in helicopters and fighter jets, it’s equipped with a 360-degree laser fuse system.

After the MANPAD is fired, a laser radiation source inside the missile spreads the light around 360 degrees; As soon as it approaches the target and reflects the light of the laser light that hits the considered target, the warhead of the missile is activated.

== Operators ==
- Iran

=== Non-State Actors ===
- Hezbollah

== Operational history ==
Iran claimed to have shot down multiple aircraft during the 2026 United States F-15E rescue operation in Iran. According to Brig. Gen. Mohammad Akrami-Nia, the Speaker for the Iranian Army, one of the MC-130J Hercules had been shot by 2nd Brig. Gen. Massoud Zare using a MANPADS (which was later reported to be a Misagh-3).
