= QW missile =

Chinese man portable surface-to-air missile

QW-1
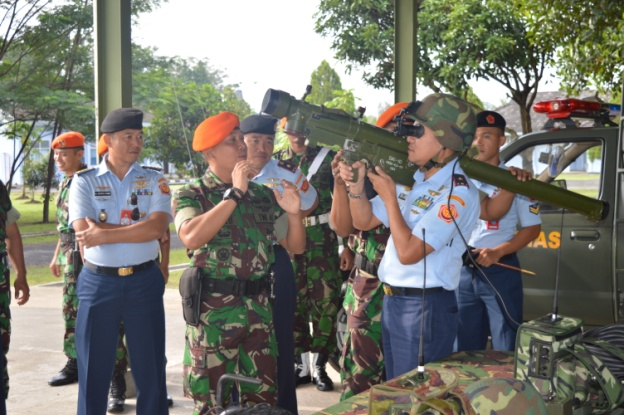
- Members of the Indonesian Quick Reaction Forces Command (Kopasgat) inspecting a QW series MANPADS launcher
- Type: Man-portable air-defense system
- Place of origin: China

Service history
- In service: 1992–present
- Used by: See Operators

Production history
- Manufacturer: Liuzhou Changhong Aerospace of the China Aerospace Science and Industry Corporation (CASIC)
- Variants: See Variants

Specifications
- Mass: QW-1: 16.5 kilograms (36 lb); QW-2: 18 kilograms (40 lb); QW-3: 21 kilograms (46 lb); QW-4: 21 kilograms (46 lb)
- Warhead: 1.42 kg (3.1 lb) high-explosive fragmentation (HE-Frag)
- Detonation mechanism: QW-1: impact QW-2/3/4: impact and laser proximity
- Engine: Rocket motor
- Operational range: QW-1: 0.5–5 km (0.31–3.11 mi); QW-2: 0.5–6 km (0.31–3.73 mi); QW-3/4: 0.8–8 km (0.50–4.97 mi)
- Flight ceiling: QW-1: 30–4,000 m (98–13,123 ft); QW-2: 10–4,000 m (33–13,123 ft); QW-3/4: 4–5,000 m (13–16,404 ft)
- Guidance system: QW-1: Infrared homing (IR); QW-2: Infrared homing (IR); QW-3: Semi-active laser homing (SALH); QW-4: Imaging infrared homing (IIR)
- Launch platform: MANPADS & surface

The QW or Qianwei (Chinese: 前卫; pinyin: Qiánwèi; lit. 'vanguard') is a series of man-portable air-defense systems (MANPADS) developed by the Chinese defense corporation China Aerospace Science and Industry Corporation (CASIC).

== History and development ==
China's first man-portable air-defense system was the HN-5, revealed at Chinese national day parade in 1984. The HN-5 is a reverse-engineered Soviet 9K32 Strela-2. The QW-1 is developed from the HN-5, and the configuration is either copied or derived from the Soviet 9K310 Igla-1 MANPADS. The U.S. Army Training and Doctrine Command (TRADOC) believed QW-1 reached initial operational capability (IOC) in 1992. The QW-1 was first revealed at the 1994 Farnborough International Airshow and showcased again on the Zhuhai Airshow in 1996. In 1997, the QW-1 was equipped for the frontline units of the People's Liberation Army (PLA). The QW-1 was exported to many countries and saw combat and kill results in Pakistan and Yemen. The QW-1 was considered a typical second-generation MANDPADS, roughly equivalent to the early versions of the FIM-92 Stinger.

In the late 1990s, China developed the third-generation QW-2 missile based on the QW-1. The QW-2 was unveiled at the 1998 Zhuhai Airshow. Unlike QW-1, the QW-2 featured a new infrared filter and the true all-aspect targeting capability. It also featured a longer slant range, a lower minimal engagement altitude, and improved counter-countermeasure capability. A distinct difference of the QW-2 when compared with the previous generation missile is the drag-reducing aerospike in front of the missile seeker. CASIC claimed the QW-2 has equal or better performance than the FIM-92 Stinger and Mistral missiles.

The QW-3 was revealed at the Zhuhai Airshow 2002. Unlike most MANPADS, which are infrared guided, the QW-3 utilizes a unique semi-active laser (SAL) homing system, which is highly resistant to infrared countermeasures. It is the only MANPADS in the world to operate under this guidance mode. The missile is used by the Indonesian Air Force for air defense. The QW-3 can also be carried by surface warships and vehicles, known as the FLS-1 sea-based air defense system and FLV-1 vehicle-mounted air defense system. The FLV-1 can also carry QW-1, QW-2, and QW-4 system. The QW-1A, an upgraded QW-1, was also unveiled at the 2002 Zhuhai Airshow. It was a QW-1 connected with an infantry-carried surveillance radar.

The concept of the QW-4 appeared at the 2002 Zhuhai Airshow. The QW-4 featured a multi-element imaging IR (ImIR) seeker, offering better all-aspect tracking capability. It entered PLA service in 2007.

CASIC began to develop the upgrades to QW-1 after it entered PLA service. At the 2006 Zhuhai Airshow, the QW-11 and QW-18 were both revealed. The QW-11 was also known as the QW-1G, an improvement on the previous QW-1 missiles with a proximity fuse for engaging smaller targets. The QW-18 is a further improved variant with a dual-band passive infrared seeker that can track the target's body and plume simultaneously, offering better counter-countermeasure capability.

At the 2014 Zhuhai Airshow, the CASIC revealed QW-12, an upgrade to QW-2. The QW-19 was also revealed, which is an improved QW-18.

== Variants ==
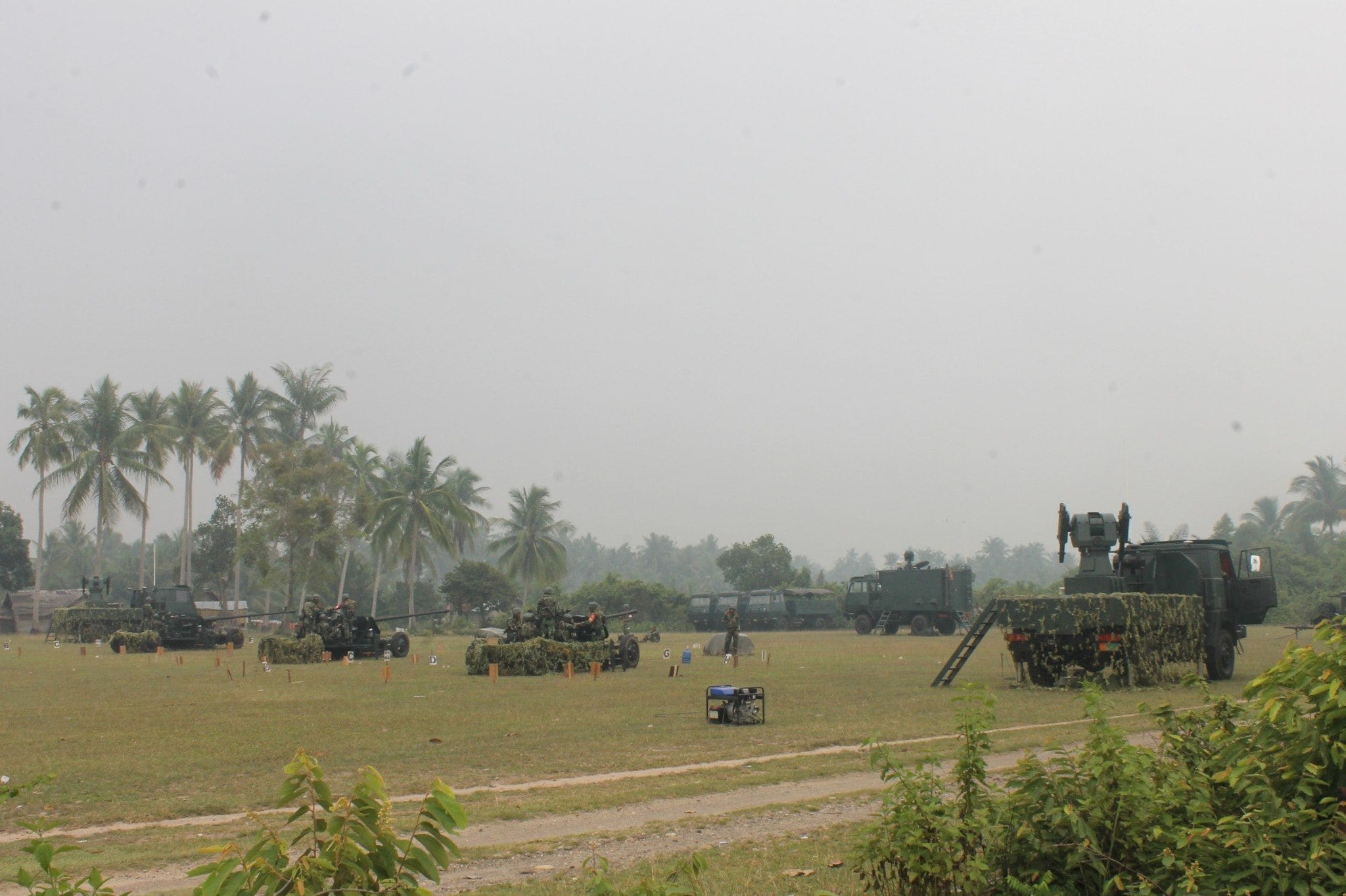
TD-2000B air defense system, the vehicle-mounted QW missiles

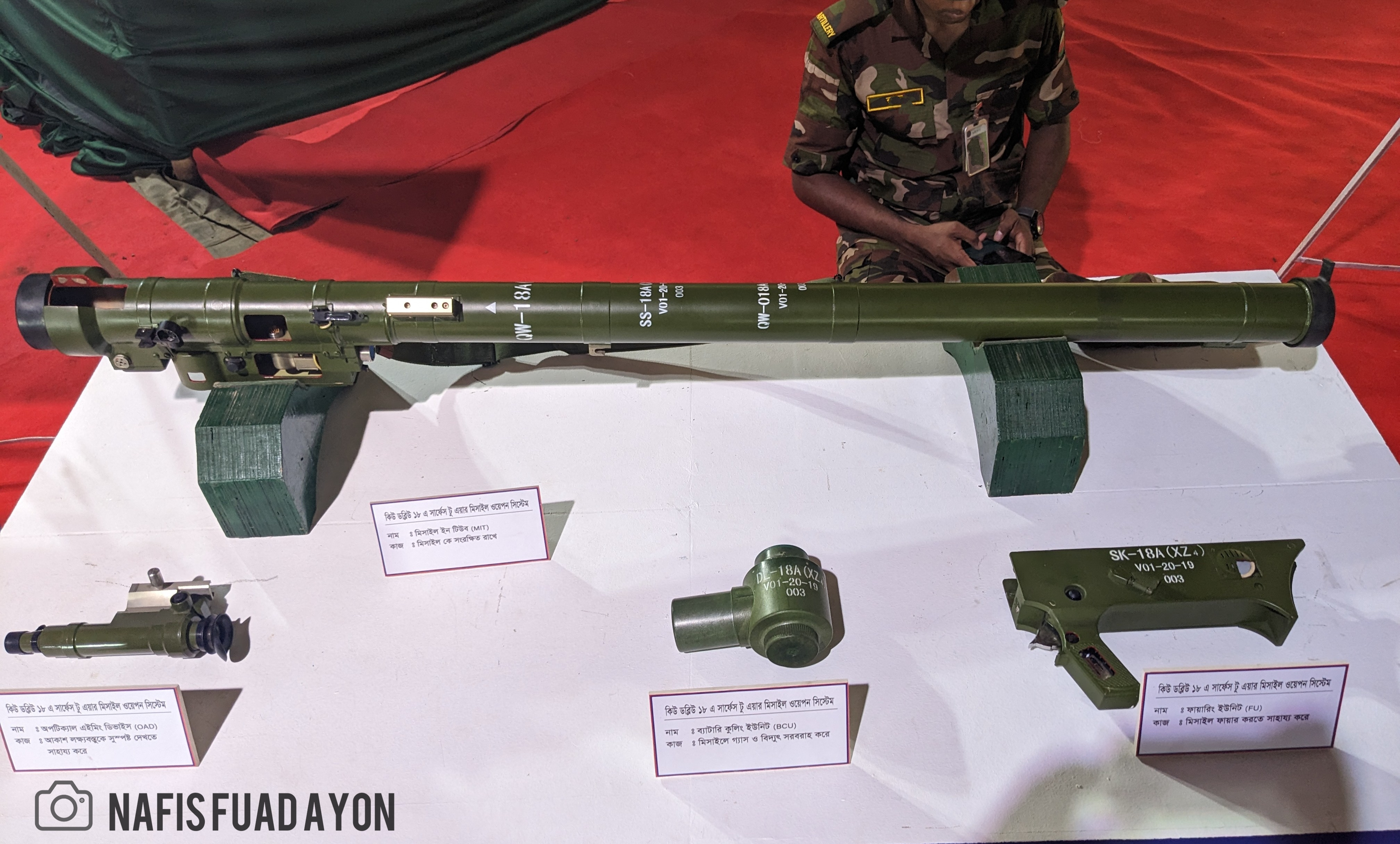
QW-18A of the Bangladesh Army

QW-1
Original variant (NATO reporting name: CH-SA-7).

QW-1M
Modernized version. Also used by Kata'ib Hezbollah.

QW-1A
The QW-1A system was showcased in 2002, which includes both the launcher and an infantry radar.

Anza-2
Version developed or produced in Pakistan.

Misagh-1
Version developed or produced in Iran.

Misagh-2
Version developed or produced in Iran. According to some sources, the Misagh-2 may be a copy of the QW-1M.

QW-11
Showcased in 2006. Improved QW-1M, also known as the QW-1G.

QW-18
Showcased in 2006. The QW-18 (NATO reporting name: CH-SA-11). It is an all-weather MANPADS system. It uses a dual-band infrared seeker.

QW-19
Unveiled in 2014. The QW-19 is an upgrade of QW-18, featuring a new digital seeker and a contact-proximity fuse with four control fins (instead of two on QW-18). It features inertial guidance mode, permitting fire before lock.

QW-2
The QW-2 (NATO reporting name: CH-SA-8.) was unveiled in 1998.

QW-12
Unveiled in 2014. Upgrade of the QW-2. On 29 July 2026, sources announced that Iran will get between 300 and 400 man-portable air defence systems, including Chinese-made QW-12 missiles, in the following weeks, with Pakistan playing a role in the weapons delivery.

QW-3
Unveiled in 2002. Semi-active laser homing missile. The only MANPADS with SAL homing guidance in the world.

TD-2000
Vehicle-mounted QW missiles.

QW-4
Concept unveiled in 2002. A variant with a multi-element imaging IR (ImIR) seeker.

== Operators ==
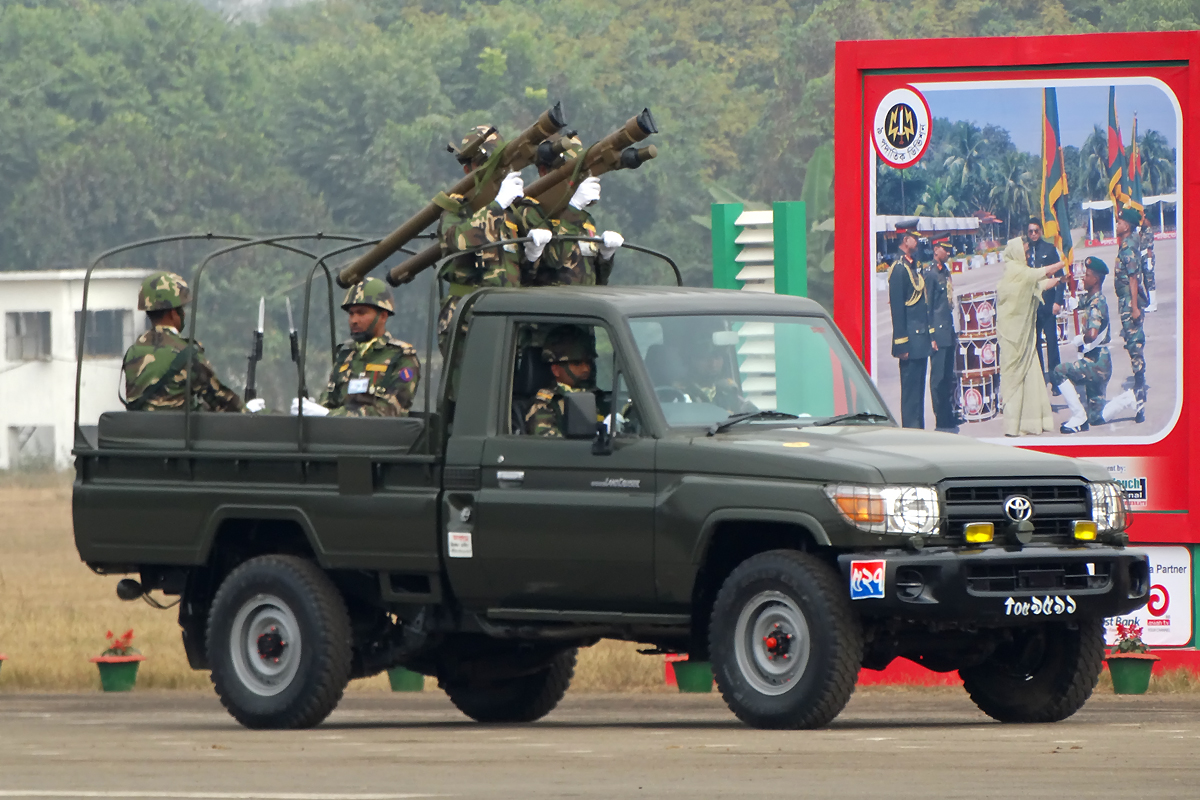
Bangladesh Army QW-2s during a Victory Day parade

- Bangladesh
  - Bangladesh Army
- China
  - People's Liberation Army
- Indonesia
  - Indonesian Air Force
- Iran: Locally manufactured as Misagh-1 (QW-1), Misagh-2 (QW-11), and Misagh-3 (QW-18)
- Pakistan: Locally manufactured as the Anza-2 (QW-1) and Anza-3 (QW-2).
- Sudan
- Turkmenistan: QW-2

== Specifications ==
QW-series missile specifications
	QW-1	QW-11	QW-18	QW-19	QW-2	QW-12	QW-3	QW-4
Introduction	1992	2006	2006	2014	1998	2014	2002	2002-2007
System weight	16.5 kg (36 lb)	16.9 kg (37 lb)	18 kg (40 lb)		18 kg (40 lb)	18.4 kg (41 lb)	23 kg (51 lb)	23 kg (51 lb)
Missile weight	10.7 kg (24 lb)	10.69 kg (23.6 lb)			11.32 kg (25.0 lb)			
System length				1.576 m (5.17 ft)		1.645 m (5.40 ft)	2.1 m (6.9 ft)	2.1 m (6.9 ft)
Missile length	1.532 m (5.03 ft)	1.477 m (4.85 ft)	1.526 m (5.01 ft)	1.526 m (5.01 ft)	1.590 m (5.22 ft)	1.590 m (5.22 ft)		
Warhead	1.42–1.5 kg (3.1–3.3 lb)				1.42 kg (3.1 lb)			
Warhead type	High-Explosive Fragmentation (HE-Frag)							
Fuze type	Impact	Impact and laser proximity						
Missile diameter	71–72 mm (2.8–2.8 in)							
Range	0.5–5 km (0.31–3.11 mi)			0.5–6 km (0.31–3.73 mi)			0.8–8 km (0.50–4.97 mi)	
Altitude	30–4,000 m (98–13,123 ft)		15–4,000 m (49–13,123 ft)	10–4,500 m (33–14,764 ft)	10–4,000 m (33–13,123 ft)		4–5,000 m (13–16,404 ft)	
Missile speed	600 m/s (Mach 1.8)			600–660 m/s (Mach 1.8 – Mach 1.9)	>600 m/s (Mach 1.8)		750 m/s (Mach 2.2)	
Seeker type	Ammonia-cooled InSb sensor, two-color infrared (IR) seeker with IR Counter-Counter Measures (IRCCM)		Dual-band passive infrared (IR) seeker				Semi-active laser homing (SALH)	Imaging IR (ImIR) seeker
Note	Developed from HN-5. Quasi-all-aspect targeting (deadzone is the target's frontal 30-degree angle).	Additional laser sensors for proximity fuse; digital processor	Improved QW-11; lower minimal engagement altitude and dual-band IR seeker to improve IRCCM	Improved QW-18; all-aspect targeting, new firing unit, digital seeker, revised battery, and improved cooling system	All-aspect targeting; fitted with IR filters.	Improved QW-2; fitted with mid-infrared (Mid-IR) dual-band filtering seeker	The only SAL homing MANPADS in the world; an additional booster can be fitted behind the missile	Added multi-element imaging IR (ImIR) seeker, offering all-aspect targeting acquisition and tracking.
Equivalences	9K310 Igla-1/SA-16; Misagh-1 (Iranian copy); Anza-MK II (Pakistani copy); Early FIM-92	Misagh-2 (Iranian copy)	Misagh-3 (Iranian copy)		9K38 Igla/SA-18; Anza Mk III (Pakistani copy); FIM-92E; Mistral	9K338 Igla-S/SA-24		

== See also ==
- The HN-5 and FN-6 are other Chinese man-portable surface-to-air missiles.
- 9K38 Igla – (Soviet Union)
- Anza (missile) – (Pakistan)
- FIM-92 Stinger – (United States)
- Qaem – (Iran)
- Misagh-2 – (Iran)
- Sungur – (Turkey)
- PZR Grom – (Poland)
- Mistral (missile) – (France)
- RBS 70 – (Sweden)
- Starstreak – (United Kingdom)

== Bibliography ==
- Chinese Tactics (PDF). Washington, D.C.: United States Department of the Army. 9 August 2021. ATP 7-100.3.
- Kirkham, Elizabeth; Okechukwu, Nneka (2010). Controlling the Transfer of Man-Portable Air Defence Systems (PDF) (Report). Saferworld.
