= RBS 70 =

Swedish man-portable air-defense system

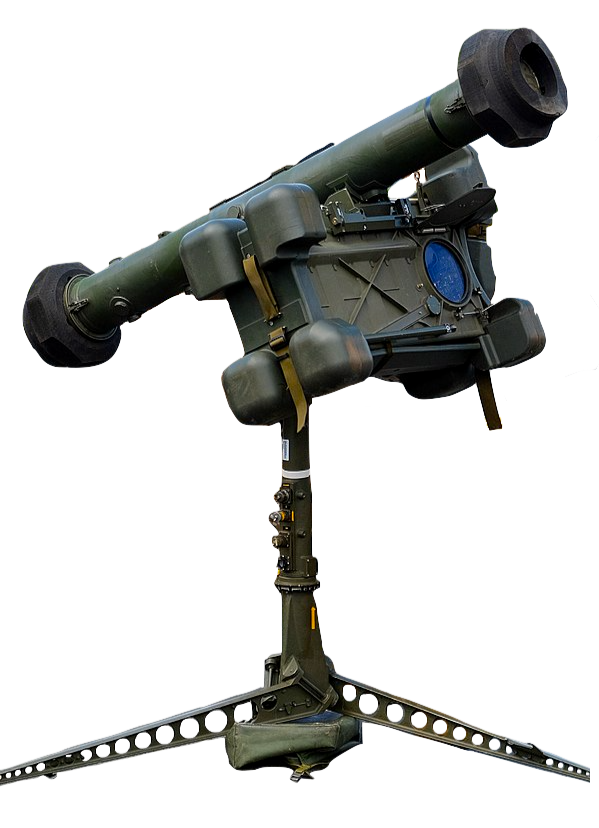
- Latvian RBS 70
- Type: Short-range Air Defense (SHORAD); Man-portable air-defence system (MANPADS)
- Place of origin: Sweden

Service history
- In service: 1977–present
- Wars: Iran–Iraq War; 1992 Venezuelan coup d'état attempts; Russian invasion of Ukraine

Production history
- Manufacturer: Bofors Defence (1980s–2000); Saab Bofors Dynamics (since 2000)
- Unit cost: 3.3 million EUR in 2023

Specifications
- Mass: 87 kg (stand + sight + missile)
- Length: 1.32 m
- Diameter: 106 mm
- Wingspan: 32 cm
- Warhead: 1.1 kg combined with 3,000 tungsten spheres and shaped charge
- Detonation mechanism: Adaptive proximity fuze function with 3 selectable modes (Off, Normal, Small target)
- Engine: Booster and sustainer with smokeless solid propellant
- Operational range: 250 m – 9 km
- Flight altitude: 5,000 m
- Maximum speed: Mach 1.6 (Mark 0/1); Mach 2 (5 km in 12 seconds) (Mark 2/BOLIDE)
- Guidance system: Laser beam riding missile
- Launch platform: tripod, weapon platform (ASRAD-R) and warship

RBS 70 (Robotsystem 70) is a man-portable air-defense system (MANPADS) designed for anti-aircraft warfare in all climate zones and with little to no support from other forces. Originally designed and manufactured by the Swedish defence firm of Bofors Defence (now Saab Bofors Dynamics, since 2000). It uses the RB 70 missile, which is also in use in a number of other Swedish missile systems.

== History ==
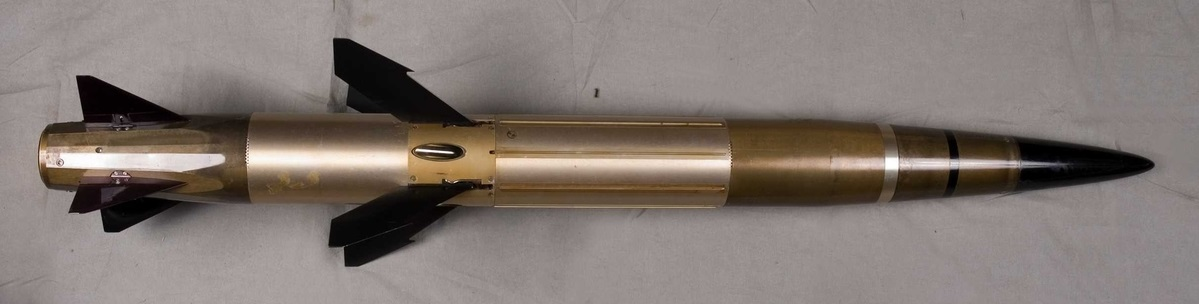
First-generation RBS 70 missile

Before RBS 70 the mainstay of Swedish short range air defence was Robotsystem 69 (American Redeye) and the Swedish Bofors m/48 AAA. Development of the Rbs 70 to supply the Swedish air defence with a low-cost, easy-to-use and effective short-range SAM system began in 1969 when Bofors AB was contracted, who decided to use a novel guidance system in the form of a laser-beam riding missile co-developed with Laser Diode Laboratories. Further studies showed the need of a radar and an Identification friend or foe-system which were ordered from LM Ericsson and Svenska Aktiebolaget Trådlös Telegrafi (SATT) respectively in 1972. This became the first missile system to fully use computer simulated firing, with some 10 000 shots taken during development. In 1975, the finished system went into series production, and RBS 70 was taken into service in 1977. In 1982, the missile was improved to MK I, while the MK II came in 1990. The fourth generation, the Mach 2 "BOLIDE" all target missile appeared in 2003 along with improvements of the IFF-system and the ability to add a BORC thermal imager. The auto-tracking RBS 70 Next Generation with an integrated thermal imager came in 2011, now with a range of 9000 metres and 5000 metre height coverage.

As a side development, the vehicle-mounted all-weather Robotsystem 90 was in service from 1993 to 2004, then mothballed until it was reactivated in 2017.

== Design ==
=== Missiles ===
The RBS 70 is a portable short-range air defence system that uses laser-guided missiles.

Mk 1 and Mk 2 followed shortly and are the standard RBS 70 with a range of 5,000–6,000 m and a ceiling of 3,000 m. Currently, RBS 70 is operational in 20 customer countries. It functions in arctic, desert, and tropical environments.

In 2003 the "BOLIDE" upgrade system was introduced to the RBS 70. The BOLIDE missile is an RBS 70 Mk 2 upgrade that is faster (Mach 2 vs Mach 1.6), with a range up to 8 km (5.0 mi) and can reach an altitude of 6 km. Deliveries were initiated in 2005.

On 8 May 2026, Saab officially launched the Bolide 2, a new-generation missile designed to significantly enhance the RBS 70 NG short-range air defence (SHORAD) system. This latest variant is engineered to counter evolving aerial threats, including drones, cruise missiles, and high-speed aircraft.

==== Missile variants ====
- RBS 70 Mk1
- RBS 70 Mk2
- RBS 70 BOLIDE
- RBS 70 BOLIDE 2

=== Launchers ===
==== RBS 70 NG upgrade ====
In 2011, Saab Bofors Dynamics (successor company of Bofors Defence) announced the introduction of the new shoulder launcher system, the RBS 70 New Generation (RBS 70 NG). The upgraded version included an improved sighting system automatic target tracking capable of night vision and improved training and after-action review features.

==== RBS 70 MSHORAD ====
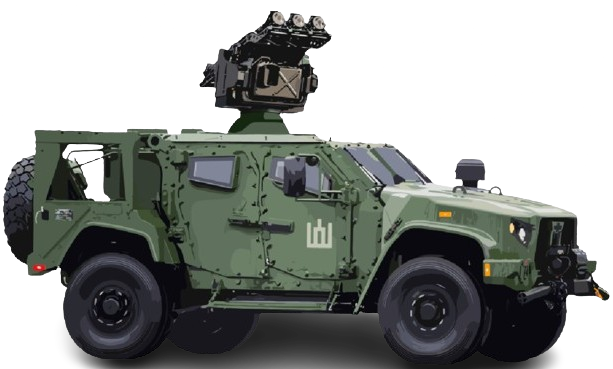
RBS-70 MSHORAD on JLTV vehicle.

In 2017, Saab demonstrated a mobile short range air defense (SHORAD) system with three components: Giraffe 1X radar, Command and Control (C2) and RBS 70 NG Remote Weapon Station (RWS). The finalized RBS 70 MSHORAD product was offered to the market in 2022. Sweden and Lithuania were the first countries to order the system, signing the contracts in January 2024 and July 2024 respectively. The Lithuanian variant has the systems mounted on the JLTV vehicles. In July 2025, the Czech Republic placed a €170 million order for 24 vehicles with RBS-70 MSHORAD.

== Operational use ==
Iran used the RBS 70 system during the Iran–Iraq War against Iraqi aircraft.

In 1990, the Royal Australian Navy embarked two RBS 70 units and Australian Army operators on board the fleet replenishment ship HMAS Success when it deployed to the Persian Gulf in the lead-up to the first Gulf War in Kuwait.

In 1992, a Venezuelan Army RBS 70 SAM is attributed with having shot down a rebel OV-10 Bronco during the 27 November 1992 coup attempt.

The Australian government has announced the Short Range Ground Based Air Defence in 2017. The plan is to find a replacement for the RBS-70. As of 2019 the NASAMS is the chosen option. Defence Department has signed a contract with Raytheon Australia. Planned replacement of the RBS-70 is financial year 2022–23.

RBS 70 was supplied to Ukraine by Sweden at the beginning of 2023 during the Russian invasion. Sweden also provided Ukraine with the Giraffe 75 short range radar for use with the RBS 70. The Ukrainian military claims to have used RBS 70 to shoot down Russian cruise missiles and Iranian-made loitering munitions.

On 17 August 2023, near Robotyne, members of the 47th Brigade used a RBS 70 to shoot down a Russian Ka-52, reportedly killing one of the two crew. On 5 December 2023, Lieutenant General Mykola Oleschuk stated that a Ukrainian RBS 70 anti-aircraft missile took down a Su-24 aircraft using the RBS-70 MANPAD in Odesa Oblast.

On 25 October 2023, the 25th airborne brigade shot down one Mi-8 helicopter in the Luhansk region using RBS-70 missile.

On 6 December 2023, the Ukrainian Air Force shot down one Russian Su-24 in Odesa Oblast using a RBS-70. On 24 December 2023, the 47th Separate Mechanized Brigade downed a Russian SuperCam drone using a RBS-70.

On 13 May 2024, the 110th Mechanized Brigade shot down two Russian Su-25 and one Ka-52 helicopter using RBS-70s.

On 29 April 2024, Australian Deputy PM and Defence Minister Richard Marles announced a $100 million (AUD) aid package for Ukraine. Half of this is for air defence, Minister Marles said that "dozens of million dollars" of RBS-70s will be provided to Ukraine. Australia is retiring RBS-70 in favour of NASAMS. It is not clear if the "Saab Giraffe" radar is included.

== See also ==
- ASRAD-R – (Germany, Sweden) (Advanced Short Range Air Defence System – RBS)
- Luftvärnsrobotbandvagn 701 – (Sweden) (Lvrbv 701), a self-propelled vehicle mounted version of RBS 70
- 9K38 Igla – (Soviet Union)
- Anza – (Pakistan)
- FIM-92 Stinger – (United States)
- KP-SAM Shingung – (South Korea)
- Misagh-2 – (Iran)
- Mistral Surface-to-Air Missile – (France)
- Qaem – (Iran)
- Starburst (missile) – (United Kingdom)
- Starstreak Surface-to Air Missile – (United Kingdom)
- Type 91 surface-to-air missile – (Japan)
- VSHORAD – (India)
