= Misagh-2 =

Iranian man-portable surface-to-air missile

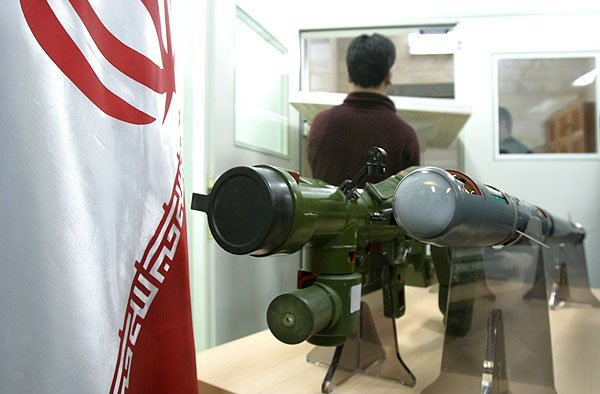
- Type: MANPADS
- Place of origin: Iran

Service history
- In service: 2005-present
- Used by: Iran

Production history
- Manufacturer: Shahid Shah Abhady Industrial Complex

Specifications
- Mass: 12.74 kg
- Length: ~1.5 m
- Diameter: Unknown
- Warhead: 1.42 kg HE
- Engine: solid rocket motor
- Operational range: 6 km
- Flight ceiling: 5 km
- Maximum speed: 850 m/s (2.8 Mach) max
- Guidance system: IR Fire and Forget
- Launch platform: Man portable

The Misagh-2 (Also known as Mithaq-2, means Covenant in English) is an Iranian man-portable infrared-guided surface-to-air missile. The Misagh-2 is the successor to the Misagh-1.

Like its predecessor, the Misagh-2 is based on Chinese technology, and in particular is believed to be an Iranian copy of the Chinese QW-1M MANPADS.

It is roughly comparable to the Soviet SA-18 Grouse (9k38 Igla) missiles.

== History ==
Iran's defense minister launched the domestic mass production of the Misagh-2 in February 2006 with the production line being opened; it is manufactured at the Shahid Shah Abhady Industrial Complex.

It was reported that various countries were invited to witness the use of the Misagh-2.

== Design ==
When fired, the Misagh-2 destroys its target within 5 second and has an operation temperature of -40 °C to +60 °C. The missile speed reaches 2.7+ Mach when it approaches its target.

The battery unit of the Misagh-2 is parallel to the launch tube, while the battery unit of the Misagh-1 is perpendicular. However, it is generally not possible to distinguish the Misagh-2 from the QW-1M, the QW-18, or the Misagh-3.

== Operators ==
- Iran
- Libya, Government of National Accord Affiliated Forces, probably supplied via Turkey.
- Syria
- Russia

=== Non-State Actors ===
- Houthis
