= Anza (missile) =

Pakistani man-portable air-defence system

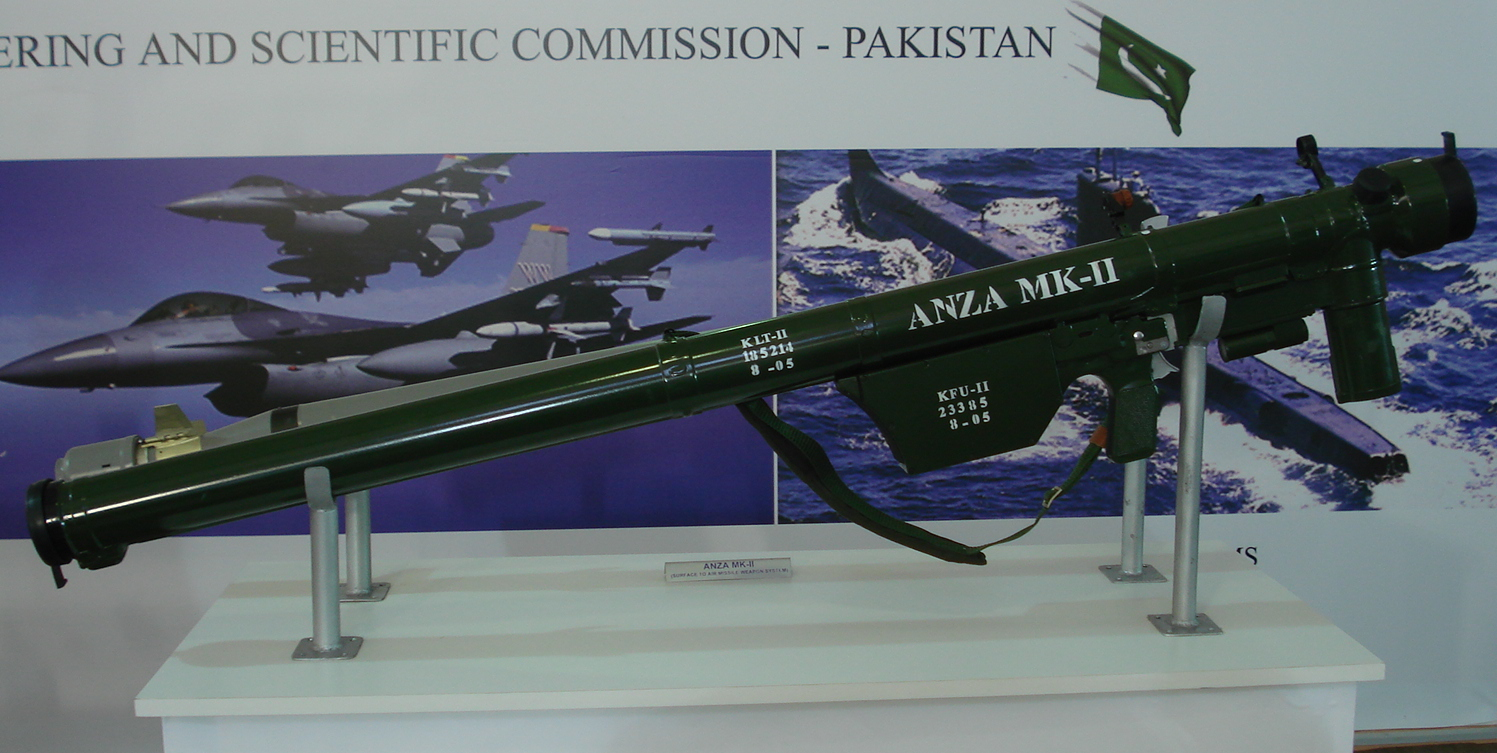
- Anza Mk-II
- Type: Man-portable air-defence system (MANPADS)
- Place of origin: Pakistan

Service history
- In service: 1989–present
- Used by: See Operators
- Wars: Kargil War; Libyan civil war (2011); Syrian Civil War

Production history
- Manufacturer: GIDS; KRL (1989–99)
- Produced: 1988
- Variants: See Variants

Specifications (Anza Mk-II)
- Mass: 16.5 kg
- Length: 1.44 m
- Diameter: 7.2 cm
- Warhead: 1.42 kg shaped charge
- Engine: Rocket motor
- Propellant: Solid propellant
- Operational range: 500–6000 m
- Flight altitude: 30–4000 m
- Maximum speed: 600+ m/s
- Guidance system: Infrared homing
- Launch platform: Human, vehicle.

The Anza (عنزہ Anza) is a series of shoulder-fired, man-portable surface-to-air missiles produced by Pakistan. Guided by an infrared homing seeker, the Anza is used for short range air defence.

The Anza is produced by Khan Research Laboratories (KRL), being one of the facility's main conventional weapons projects. Development was originally undertaken to eliminate dependence on importing expensive foreign systems. Various versions of the Anza are currently in service with the Pakistan Army, with the Mk-III version being the most recent.

GIDS currently manufactures the Anza.

== Development ==
Some sources state that the Anza Mk-II was co-developed in a joint project by Pakistan and China.

The Anza Mk-I entered service with the Pakistan Army in January 1990, followed by the Anza Mk-II in September 1994. Serial production of Anza Mk-III for the Pakistan Army was announced in 2006.

Pakistan has also advertised the Anza series for export, displaying it at the International Defense Exhibition (IDEX) 2007 event in the United Arab Emirates and at the IDEAS 2008 defence exhibition in Pakistan.

=== Training aids ===
The Mk-II is known to have the ATS-II Training Simulator included, which consists of a set of four Mk-II training missiles, four firing units, simulated ground batteries, cable interconnectors, PC-based control, monitoring and scoring unit with a target simulator made up of an infrared electric bulb moving along an overhead wire.

The High Speed Aerial Target Drone, or HISAT-DK, is a high speed, low maintenance target drone that can be used in training operators to use the Anza. It is manned by a four-man crew using Optical Tracking Pod devices. The drones can be used for MANPAD training, though they are also used for other purposes, such as artillery fire support training.

== Operational history ==
On 27 May 1999, the Anza Mk-II was used by the Pakistan Army's Air Defence Forces to shoot down an Indian MiG-21 and Mi-17 during the Kargil conflict.

In December 2002, The Indian media sources claimed that their soldiers found an Anza Mk-I in a militant hideout near the Line of Control in Kupwara, Kashmir. An Anza system had previously been found at a militant hideout by Indian Army soldiers in 2001. In 2002, Indian media sources again claimed that an Anza MANPAD was fired at an Indian Air Force Antonov An-32 over the Line of Control; the plane was able to land safely.

In 2004, Saudi Assistant Minister for Defense Prince Khaled ibn Sultan of Saudi Arabia and Defense Minister Rao Sikandar Iqbal of Pakistan had been in talks for joint production of the Anza.

In November 2008, the Pakistan Army conducted exercises with the Anza Mk-II in a semi-desert area near Muzaffargarh in response to covert attacks on targets in north-west Pakistan by American unmanned aerial vehicles (UAV). In the same month, the chief of the Pakistan Air Force told reporters that his forces are fully capable of shooting down the American drones, but it was the responsibility of the government to decide whether the drone attacks were stopped through diplomacy or military engagement. In the 2010 Azm-e-Nau 3 exercises, the air defence of Pakistan Army exhibited accurate targeting of enemy's aircraft while in its attacking position, with a pinpoint precision through shoulder operated system of Anza Missiles

In 2014, it was reported that the Saudi government sought to obtain Anzas in an effort to provide support for anti-Assad forces in Syria.

In June 2015, Small Arms Survey reported that Anzas were used by Libya in 2011.

== Variants ==
- Anza Mk-I - The first MANPADS produced by Pakistan for use by the Pakistan Army. Development is based on the Chinese HN-5B MANPADS. A British source said the Anza is a copy of the SA-7 Grail. Approximately 1000 Anza Mk-I were produced between 1989 and 1998.

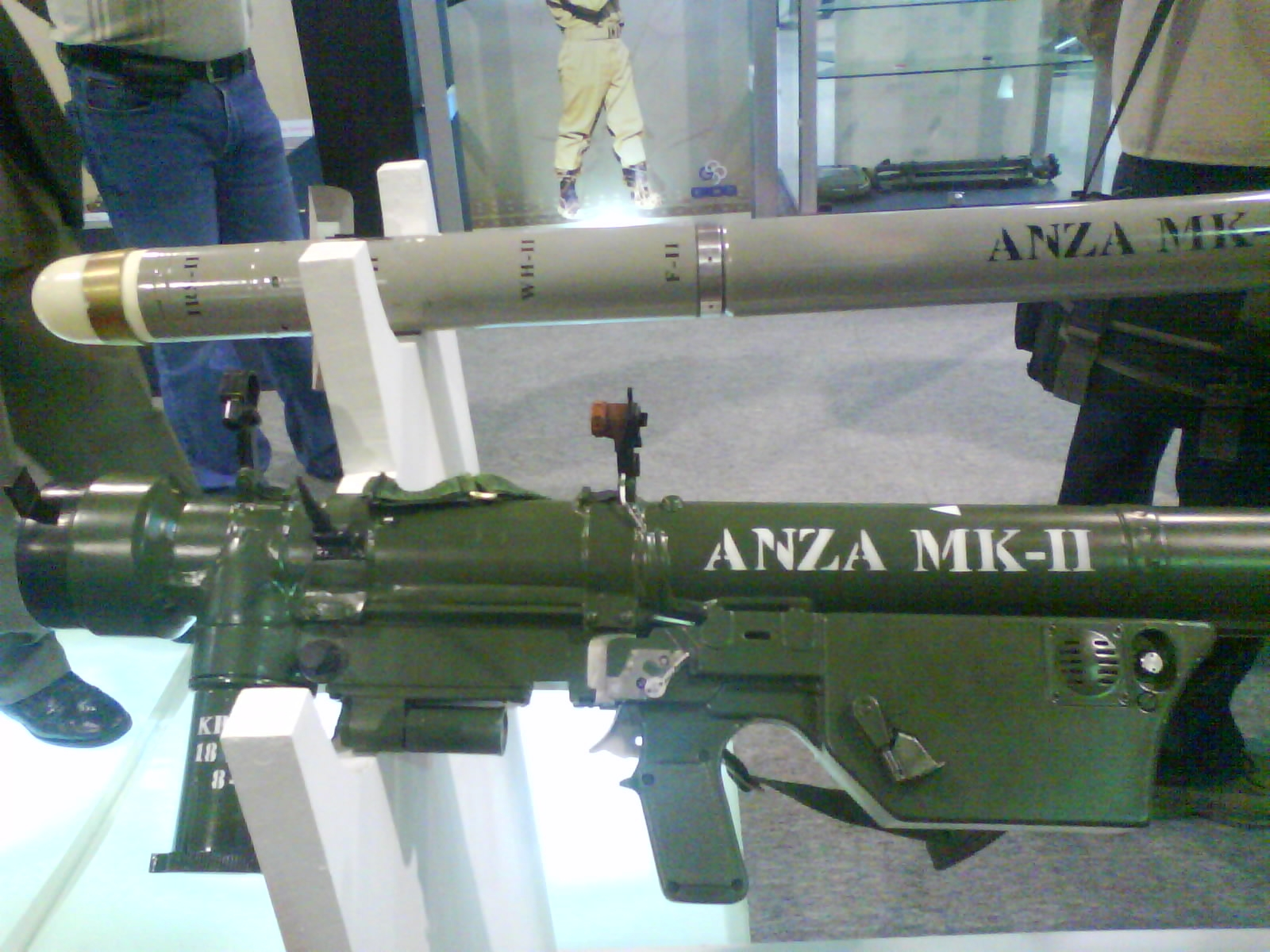
Anza Mk-II on display at the IDEAS 2008 defence exhibition, Pakistan.

- Anza Mk-II - A third generation MANPADS, believed to be based on the Chinese QW-1 MANPADS. Uses a dual-band, cross-scan infrared homing seeker to counter decoy flares. Also believed to use American missile technology. Approximately 2650 Anza Mk-II were produced between 1994 and 2022.
- Anza Mk-III - Believed to be based on the Chinese QW-2 MANPADS, modifications made to meet Pakistan Army requirements include increased range up to 5 km, improved sensors and a new firing unit similar to the Russian 9K38 Igla MANPADS. All-aspect attack capability and improved ECCM capability. It also has a vehicle-mounted launcher variant.

== Operators ==
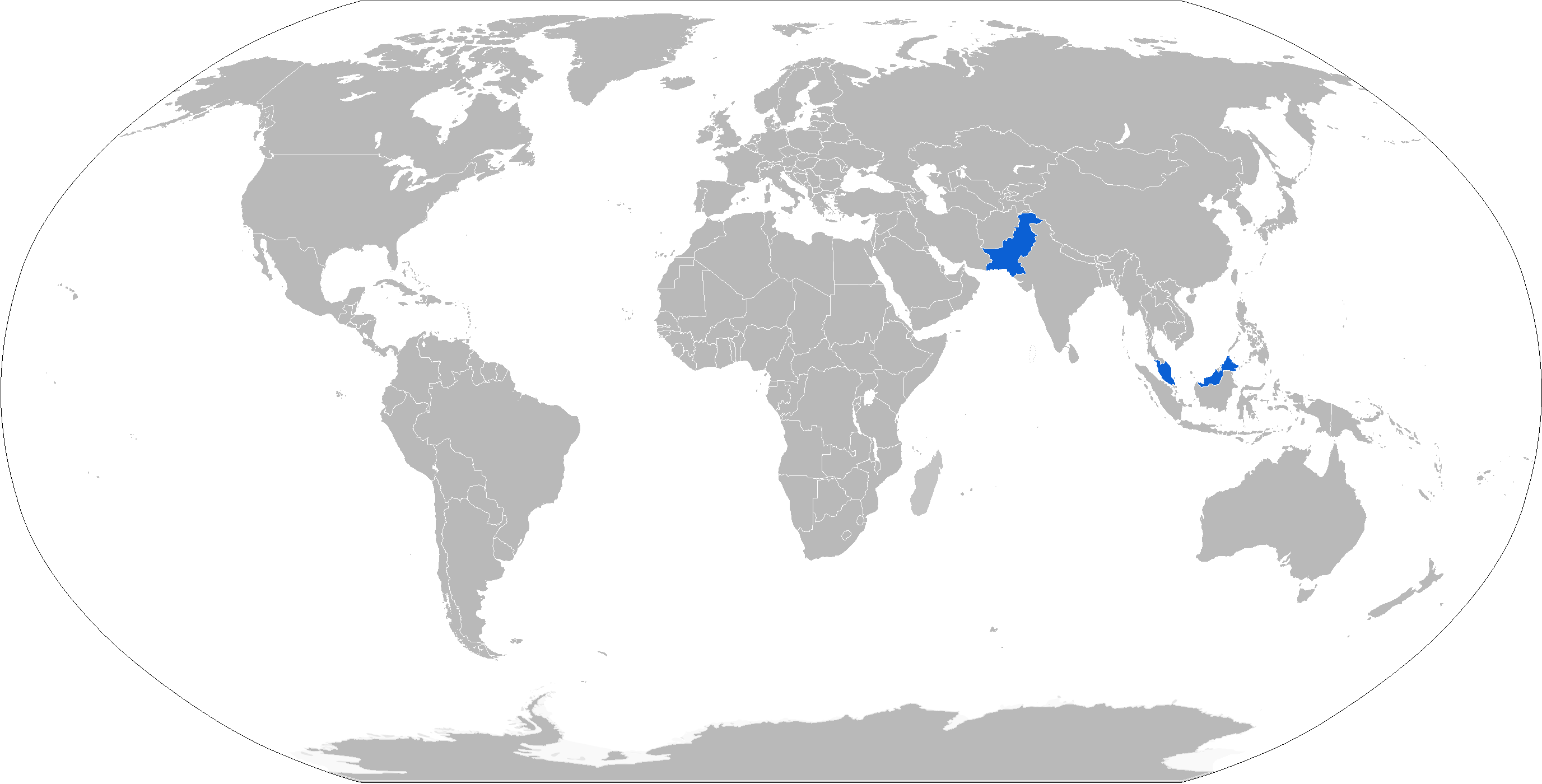
Map with Anza operators in blue

- Libya: Reported to be used in Libya from 2011.
- Pakistan: Large numbers of Mk.I, Mk.II and Mk.III are in service with the Pakistani Army.
- Malaysia: 100 Anza Mk-I systems, received in 2002. 500 Anza MK.II systems delivered as part of a RM446 million arms deal with Pakistan, used to arm the 10th Paratrooper Brigade.
- Syria: Anza Mk.-IIs captured from rebels.
- Ukraine: Anza Mk-IIs reported to be acquired by the Ukrainian military.

== Specifications ==
	Anza Mk-I	Anza Mk-II	Anza Mk-III
Length (missile and booster)	1.44 m	1.447 m	1.59 m
Weight (launcher and missile)	15 kg	16.5 kg	18 kg
Missile weight	9.8 kg	10.68 kg	11.32 kg
Propulsion	Solid fuel rocket motor (solid fuel booster rocket on launch)		
Guidance	Uncooled PbS passive infrared homing seeker	Cooled InSb passive infrared homing seeker	Dual-band infrared homing seeker
Warhead	HE fragmentation (containing 0.37 kg HE) with contact and graze fusing	HE fragmentation (containing 0.55 kg HE) with contact and graze fusing	HE fragmentation (containing 1.42 kg HE) with contact and graze fusing
Average cruise speed	500 m/s	600 m/s	>600 m/s
Max maneuvering	6 g	16 g	
Self destruction time	14 to 17 s	14 to 18 s	
Slant range	1,200 m to 4,200 m	500 m to 5,000 m	6,000 m
Altitude	50 m to 2300 m	30 m to 4,000 m	10 m to 3,500 m
Weapon reaction time	5 s	3.5 s	3.5 s
Ready from the march	10 s	10 s	10 s
Battery life	40 s	50 s	50 s
