= Missile guidance =

Variety of methods of guiding a missile

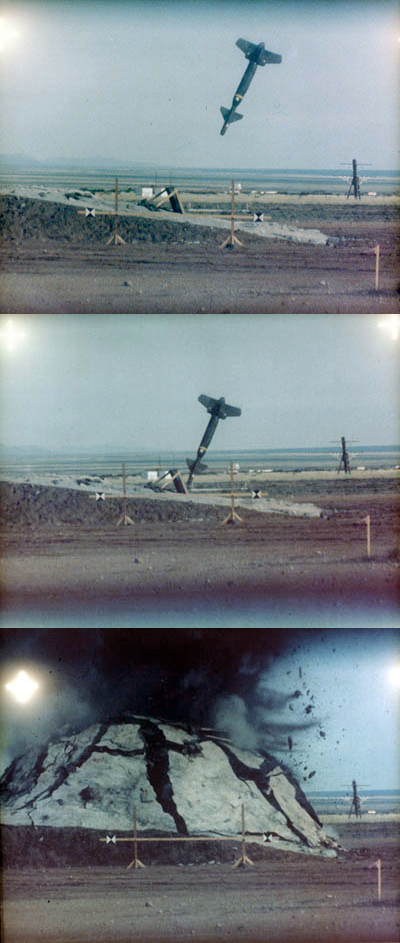
A guided bomb strikes a practice target

Missile guidance is a field of engineering, specifically guidance, navigation and control, dealing with the control of missiles and guided bombs. Missile guidance systems are designed to maximize the reliability and accuracy of these weapons, by improving the likelihood they reach their target.

Guidance systems can be broadly divided into two categories: Go-onto-target (GOT) systems can be used against moving targets, and go-onto-location-in-space (GOLIS) systems attack fixed geographical positions.

Missiles and guided bombs generally use similar types of guidance system, the difference between the two being that missiles are powered by an onboard engine, whereas guided bombs rely on the speed of the launch aircraft and gravity for propulsion.

== History ==
In the late 1880s, Jules Verne featured in his fiction books a rocket-powered missile with a target seeker, proximity fuze, and a warhead.

During World War I, various nations experimented with guided missiles. Systems were developed for the first powered drones by Archibald Low (the father of radio guidance). In France, Pierre Lorin developed a radio-powered missile with the intention of using it to strike Berlin, but the French military was not interested in the project.

During World War II, guided missiles were developed as part of the German V-weapons program. At the time, Germany was limited by the Treaty of Versailles from developing conventional weapons, so they focused their efforts on new weapons outside the provisions of the treaty. Guided missiles were one such avenue of development. The American Army Air Forces had dozens of various programs experimenting with "flying bombs, glide bombs, and vertical bombs".

Following World War II, in the winter of 1946, President Harry S. Truman ordered funding cuts from programs across the American armed forces, particularly targeted at research and development. In response to these cuts, which became known as "the black Christmas of 1946", the Air Staff reduced the guided missile budget by 55%. By the end of March of the following year, 10 guided missile projects had been cancelled and 19 remained.

Upon the opening of the Korean War, American development of guided missiles was rapidly accelerated.

The first U.S. ballistic missile with a highly accurate inertial guidance system was the short-range PGM-11 Redstone.

== Go-onto-target (GOT) systems ==
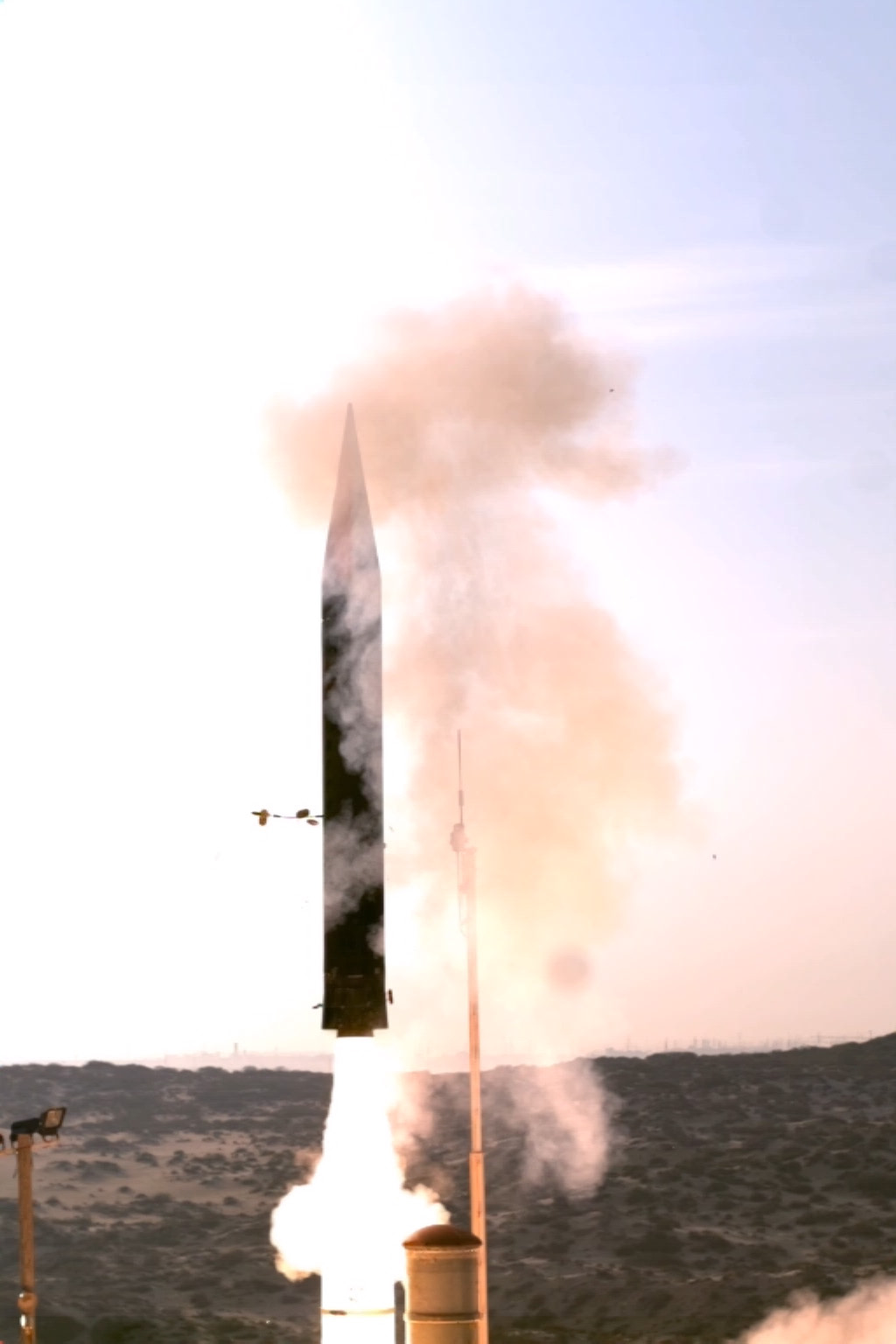
Israeli Arrow 3, which uses proportional navigation to intercept ballistic missiles

=== Homing guidance ===
In homing guidance systems, the missile tracks the target using its own sensors, and uses that information to generate its own control commands. Types of sensors include radar, infrared, and light. Homing missiles usually do not need to communicate with a ground station or launch platform. Homing guidance is useful for fire-and-forget missiles.

Homing guidance can be divided into three categories: active, semi-active, and passive. In active homing, the missile illuminates the target using its own source of radiation, such as a radar. Semi-active homing relies on an external source of radiation separate from the missile. Passive homing tracks only the targets own emissions or contrast against the background. Most modern homing missiles use variants of proportional navigation to steer during the terminal phase of flight.

Some examples of missiles that use homing guidance include the AIM-120 AMRAAM and R-77, which use active homing; the AIM-7 Sparrow and R-27R, which use semi-active homing; and the passive homing FIM-92 Stinger and 9K38 Igla.

=== Remote control guidance ===
These guidance systems usually need the use of radars and a radio or wired link between the control point and the missile; in other words, the trajectory is controlled with the information transmitted via radio, beam, or wire (see Wire-guided missile). Some missiles will use both command guidance and homing guidance at different phases of flight. Commonly missiles will use command guidance during the boost and middle phases of flight, then switch to homing guidance in the terminal phase.

==== Command guidance ====
Command guidance is a system in which the guidance commands originate outside the missile. Command guidance requires two links between the missile and the transmitter: the information link and the command link. The information link allows the controller to determine the position of the missile, and the command link allows commands to be transmitted from the controller to the missile. In some systems, both links are accomplished using the same tracking unit (i.e. radar, optical, laser, or infrared), but others have a distinct tracking unit for each system. A disadvantage of command guidance is it requires the target to be illuminated by an external energy source, from the launcher or elsewhere. This can alert the target, which could then conduct evasive maneuvers or SEAD. Two examples of command-guided missiles are the MIM-104 Patriot and S-300P/PT.

==== Beam riding ====
Beam riding missiles use an electromagnetic beam of some sort, typically radar or laser, which is pointed at the target. Sensors on the rear of the missile receive the beam and the control systems of the missile use this information to calculate steering commands, attempting to keep the missile in the beam. These are sometimes considered distinct from command guidance.

Beam riding systems are often SACLOS, but do not have to be; in other systems the beam is part of an automated radar tracking system. A case in point is the later versions of the RIM-8 Talos missile as used by the United States largely during the Vietnam War – the radar beam was used to take the missile on a high arcing flight and then gradually brought down in the vertical plane of the target aircraft, the more accurate SARH homing being used at the last moment for the actual strike. This gave the enemy pilot the least possible warning that his aircraft was being illuminated by missile guidance radar, as opposed to search radar. This is an important distinction, as the nature of the signal differs, and is used as a cue for evasive action.

An advantage of beam riding is multiple missiles may be launched at once using the same beam, due to the reduced tracking load on the launcher. Beam riding suffers from the inherent weakness of inaccuracy with increasing range as the beam spreads out. Laser beam riders are more accurate in this regard, but they tend to be shorter range, and the laser beam can be degraded by bad weather. SARH becomes more accurate with decreasing distance to the target, so the two systems are complementary.

The Seaslug and 9K121 Vikhr are examples of beam riding missiles.

== Go-onto-location-in-space (GOLIS) systems ==
Whatever the mechanism used in a GOLIS guidance system is, it must contain preset information about the target. These systems' main characteristic is the lack of a target tracker. The guidance computer and the missile tracker are located in the missile. The lack of target tracking in GOLIS necessarily implies navigational guidance.

Navigational guidance is any type of guidance executed by a system without a target tracker. The other two units are on board the missile. These systems are also known as self-contained guidance systems; however, they are not always entirely autonomous due to the missile trackers used.

=== Preset guidance ===
Preset guidance is the simplest type of missile guidance. From the distance and direction of the target, the trajectory of the flight path is determined. Before firing, this information is programmed into the missile's guidance system, which, during flight, maneuvers the missile to follow that path. All of the guidance components (including sensors such as accelerometers or gyroscopes) are contained within the missile, and no outside information (such as radio instructions) is used. An example of a missile using preset guidance is the V-2 rocket.

=== Inertial guidance ===
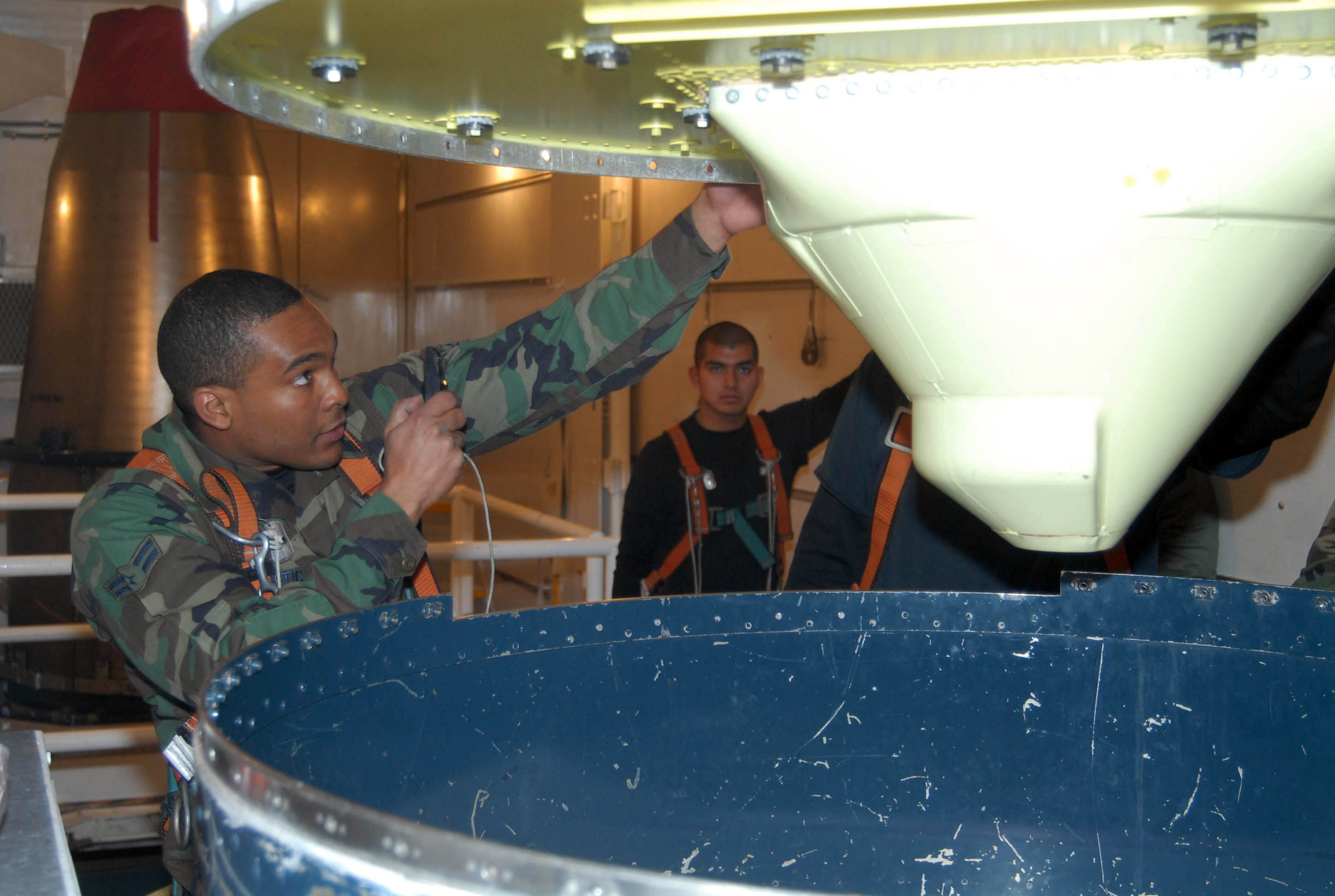
Minuteman III guidance system being inspected

Inertial guidance relies on gyroscopes and accelerometers to estimate a missile's position and velocity after leaving a known starting position, in a process known as dead reckoning. Early mechanical systems were not very accurate, and required some sort of external adjustment to allow them to hit targets even the size of a city. Modern systems use solid state ring laser gyros that are accurate to within metres over ranges of 10,000 km, and no longer require additional inputs. Gyroscope development has culminated in the AIRS found on the MX missile, allowing for an accuracy of less than 100 m at intercontinental ranges. Many civilian aircraft use inertial guidance using a ring laser gyroscope, which is less accurate than the mechanical systems found in ICBMs, but which provide an inexpensive means of attaining a fairly accurate fix on location (when most airliners such as Boeing's 707 and 747 were designed, GPS was not the widely commercially available means of tracking that it is today). Today guided weapons can use a combination of INS, GPS and radar terrain mapping to achieve extremely high levels of accuracy such as that found in modern cruise missiles.

Inertial guidance is most favored for the initial guidance and reentry vehicles of strategic missiles, because it has no external signal and cannot be jammed. Additionally, the relatively low precision of this guidance method is less of an issue for large nuclear warheads.

A variant of inertial guidance for engaging slow-moving targets is predicted line of sight (PLOS), which flies the missile along a pre-calculated curved path to remain on the line of sight between launcher and target. Since PLOS missiles do not rely on onboard seekers or post-launch command links, they are immune to many countermeasures. This method is employed in anti-tank weapons such as the NLAW and FGM-172 SRAW.

=== Astro-inertial guidance ===
Astro-inertial guidance, or stellar-inertial guidance, is a sensor fusion-information fusion of inertial guidance and celestial navigation. It is usually employed on submarine-launched ballistic missiles. Unlike silo-based intercontinental ballistic missiles, whose launch point does not move and thus can serve as a reference, SLBMs are launched from moving submarines, which complicates the necessary navigational calculations and increases circular error probable. Stellar-inertial guidance is used to correct small position and velocity errors that result from launch condition uncertainties due to errors in the submarine navigation system and errors that may have accumulated in the guidance system during the flight due to imperfect instrument calibration.

The USAF sought a precision navigation system for maintaining route accuracy and target tracking at very high speeds. Nortronics, Northrop's electronics development division, had developed an astro-inertial navigation system (ANS), which could correct inertial navigation errors with celestial observations, for the SM-62 Snark missile, and a separate system for the ill-fated AGM-48 Skybolt missile, the latter of which was adapted for the SR-71.

It uses star positioning to fine-tune the accuracy of the inertial guidance system after launch. As the accuracy of a missile is dependent upon the guidance system knowing the exact position of the missile at any given moment during its flight, the fact that stars are a fixed reference point from which to calculate that position makes this a potentially very effective means of improving accuracy.

In the Trident missile system this was achieved by a single camera that was trained to spot just one star in its expected position (it is believed that the missiles from Soviet submarines would track two separate stars to achieve this), if it was not quite aligned to where it should be then this would indicate that the inertial system was not precisely on target and a correction would be made.

=== Terrestrial guidance ===
TERCOM, for "terrain contour matching", uses altitude maps of the strip of land from the launch site to the target, and compares them with information from a radar altimeter on board. More sophisticated TERCOM systems allow the missile to fly a complex route over a full 3D map, instead of flying directly to the target. TERCOM is the typical system for cruise missile guidance, but is being supplanted by GPS systems and by DSMAC, digital scene-matching area correlator, which employs a camera to view an area of land, digitizes the view, and compares it to stored scenes in an onboard computer to guide the missile to its target.

DSMAC is reputed to be so lacking in robustness that destruction of prominent buildings marked in the system's internal map (such as by a preceding cruise missile) upsets its navigation.

== See also ==
- Artillery fuze
- Countermeasure
- Electronic warfare
- List of missiles
- Magnetic proximity fuze
- Precision bombing
- Precision-guided munition
- Proximity fuze
- Proximity sensor
- Terminal guidance
