= FGM-172 SRAW =

American/Israeli anti-tank missile system

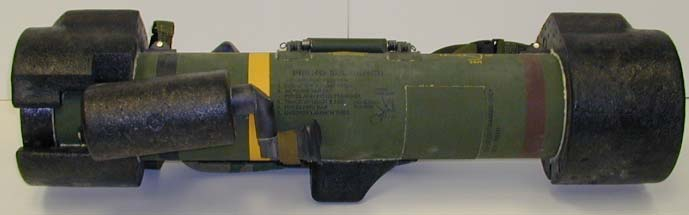
- FGM-172A SRAW
- Type: Anti-Tank Missile Launcher
- Place of origin: United States, Israel

Service history
- In service: 2002–2006
- Used by: United States, Israel

Production history
- Designer: Lockheed Martin
- Designed: 1990–2002
- Manufacturer: Lockheed Martin
- Produced: 2002–2003
- No. built: 960
- Variants: FGM-172A anti-tank FGM-172B assault

Specifications
- Mass: 9.7 kg (21 lb)
- Length: 70.5 cm (2.31 ft)
- Width: 14 cm (5.5 in)
- Diameter: 139 mm (5.5 in)
- Crew: 1
- Caliber: 139 mm (5.5 in)
- Muzzle velocity: 250 m/s (820 ft/s)
- Effective firing range: 17 to 600 m (19 to 660 yd)
- Warhead: FGM-172A: explosively formed penetrator FGM-172B: multipurpose blast warhead
- Detonation mechanism: FGM-172A: proximity fuze FGM-172B: combined contact fuze & time fuze
- Guidance system: PLOS (Predicted Line Of Sight)
- Launch platform: Man-portable launcher

The FGM-172 SRAW (Short-Range Assault Weapon), also known as the Predator SRAW, was a lightweight, close range missile system produced by Lockheed Martin, developed by Lockheed Martin and Israel Military Industries. It is designed to complement the FGM-148 Javelin anti-tank missile. The Predator had a longer range and was more powerful than the AT4 that it was designed to replace, but had a shorter range than the Javelin.

The missile system received the FGM-172 designation from the United States Department of Defense in 2006. Before that it was known as the SRAW MK 40 MOD 0.

== Features ==
The Predator was a fire-and-forget weapon utilizing a system called predicted line of sight (PLOS). In this system, the operator tracks the target for a short time (at least 2 seconds and no more than 12) before launch. This data is then combined with known missile flight performance to predict a flight path that will intercept the target's course, and program the missile's autopilot system. An inertial guidance unit is incorporated into the autopilot to compensate for crosswind and other factors encountered in flight.

The original FGM-172A was an overfly top attack (OTA) type and used a downward-facing dual laser and magnetic sensor to detect a target and trigger detonation of the warhead. The laser sensor would locate the positions of the leading and trailing edges of a vehicle, and the magnetic sensor would confirm the position of the vehicle. Once a target is detected, the FGM-172A would fire an explosively formed penetrator downward, into what was intended to be the thinner armor of a tank turret roof.

The missile does not lock on to a specific target, rather, the FGM-172A would attack the first potential target it encountered during flight. For this reason, TM 10687A OR/C directs operators to avoid firing the weapon over destroyed vehicles.

The FGM-172B altered the flight control systems for a direct intercept rather than an overfly course, and featured a dual-mode impact fuze with an automatic time delay if the missile struck a soft target.

The Kestrel variant featured an added unguided direct-fire mode.

== Variants ==
The missile was produced in two variants, each with a separate weapon payload.

The FGM-172A had a downward-firing top attack warhead activated by a dual sensor fuse, intended for use as an anti-armor weapon.

The FGM-172B had a multi-purpose blast-fragmentation warhead, intended for use as an assault weapon. Also known as the FGM-172B SRAW-MPV.

== History ==
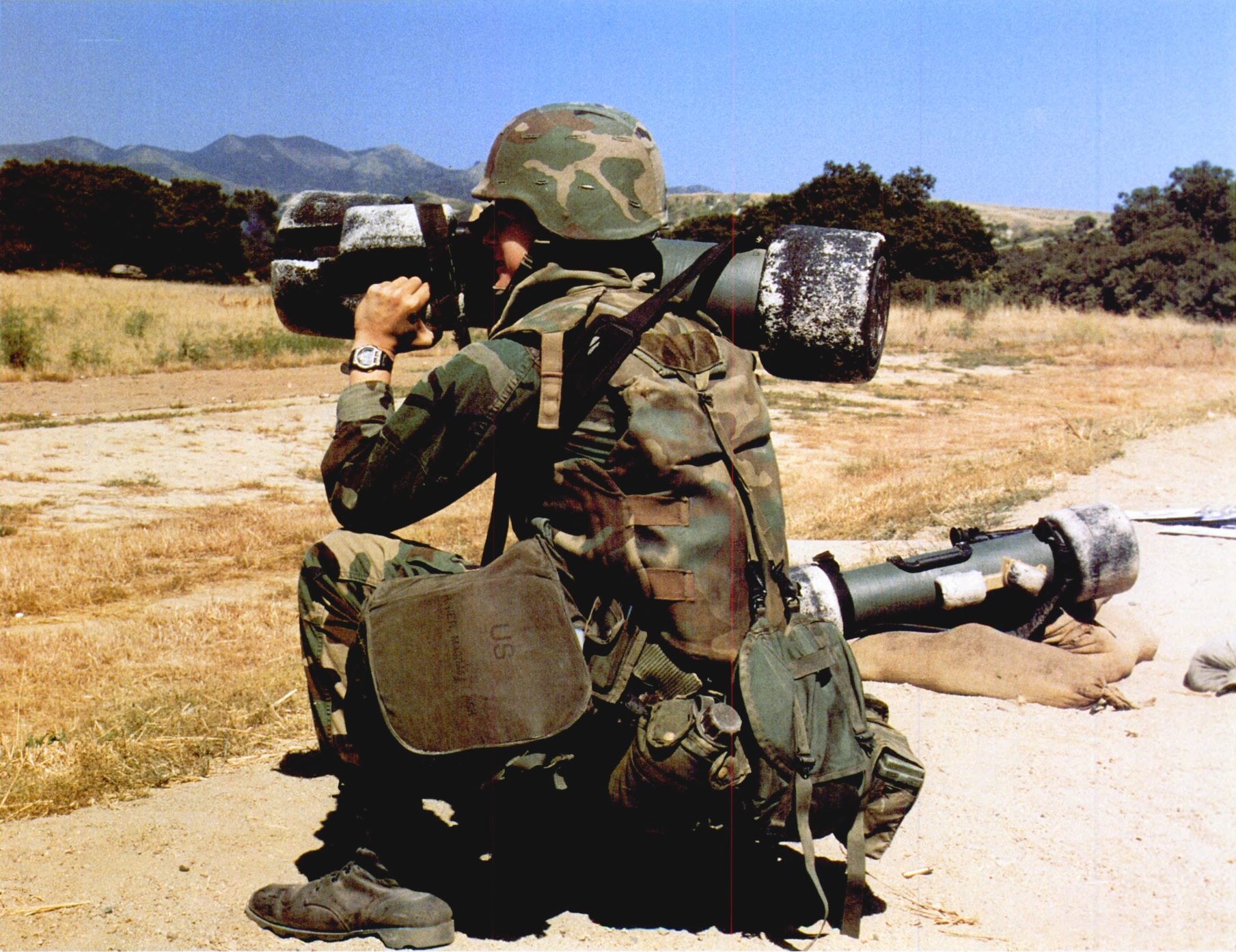
US serviceman aiming an FGM-172 SRAW

The Short-Range Assault Weapon (SRAW) program was begun by the U.S. Marine Corps in 1987 as a replacement for existing unguided M72 LAW and AT4 anti-armor rockets. A demonstration and validation phase was conducted by several companies between February 1990 and mid-1993, with the first test firings occurring in 1991.

In July 1994, the Predator design of Loral (now Lockheed Martin) was selected for the engineering and manufacturing development (EMD) phase. EMD Phase I was completed in March 1998, followed by Phase II; 230 missiles were produced during EMD.

In February 2002, the Marine Corps signed a contract with Lockheed Martin for the low-rate initial production (LRIP) of 330 Predator systems, with a second LRIP contract for 400 systems signed in January 2003. In October 2003, the Marine Corps announced a decision to cancel further procurement of the system following completion of low-rate production. The system successfully completed first article and lot 1 testing at the Naval Air Warfare Center, China Lake, California in December 2003.

In June 2004, Lockheed Martin received a contract to refit all 700 remaining SRAW rounds to the FGM-172B SRAW-MPV (Multi-Purpose Variant) configuration with a new multi-purpose blast-fragmentation warhead, converting the system from an anti-armor to a direct-fire urban assault weapon effective against buildings and bunkers, which better fulfilled the needs of the Marines in response to requirements identified during Operation Iraqi Freedom; delivery of the first 400 rounds was completed in May 2005. As of 2005, all the FGM-172A missiles supplied formerly to the USMC had been retrofitted with the FGM-172B multi-purpose blast warhead to replace the top attack anti-armor warhead.

The Kestrel was a derivative of the Predator for the British Army's Next-generation Light Anti-tank Weapon (NLAW) programme. In 2000, the UK Ministry of Defence carried out trials of 13 Kestrels. In May 2002, Saab Bofors Dynamics' MBT-LAW was chosen for the UK NLAW requirement. In 2003, the U.S. Army decided not to adopt a version of the Predator as its Multipurpose Individual Munition – Short Range Assault Weapon (MPIM/SRAW) candidate.

== Former operators ==
- United States Marine Corps
