= Javelin (surface-to-air missile) =

British man-portable surface-to-air missile

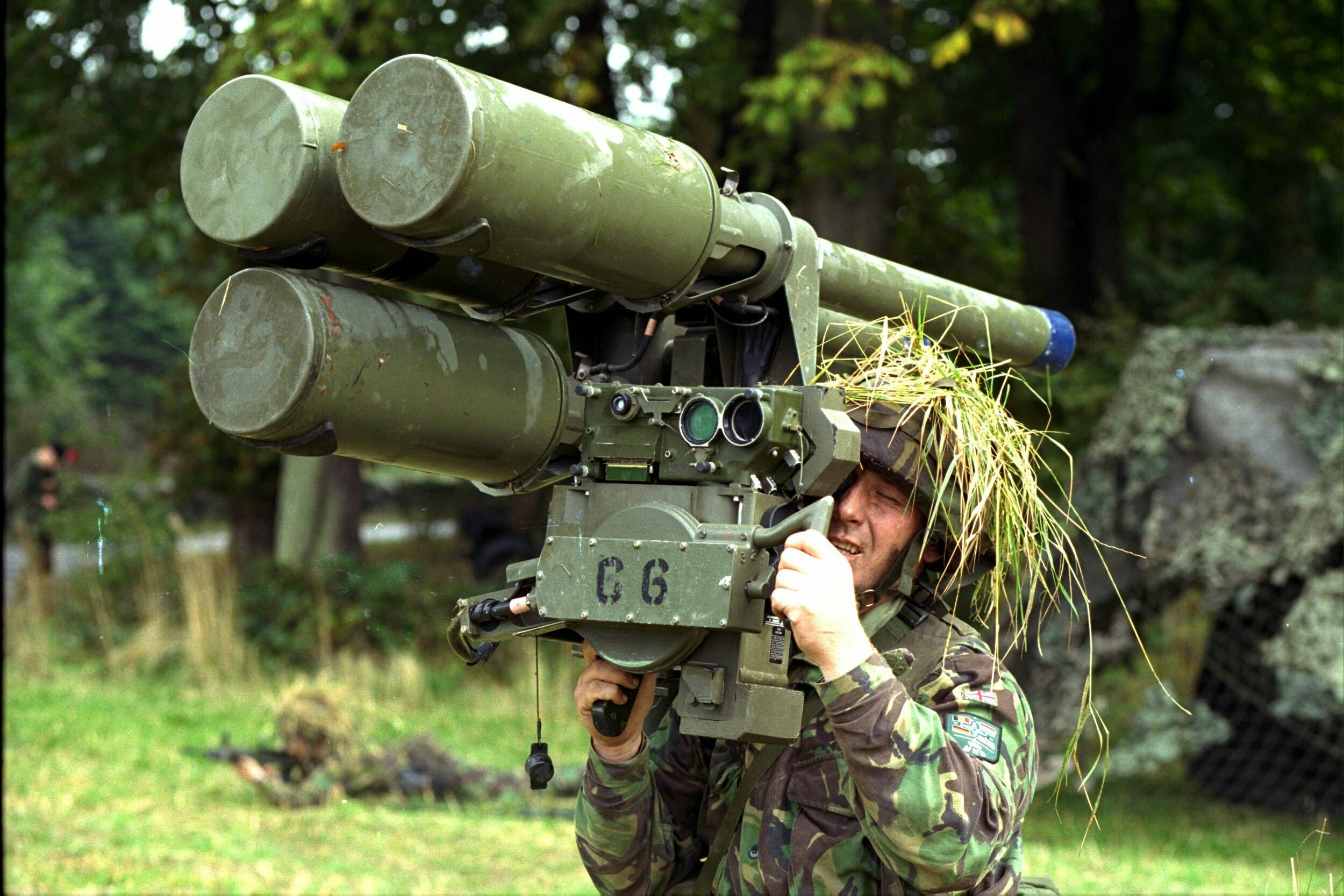
- British soldier posing with Javelin triple launcher, 1995
- Type: Manportable surface-to-air missile
- Place of origin: United Kingdom

Service history
- Used by: See Operators

Production history
- Manufacturer: Thales Air Defence

Specifications
- Mass: 11.1 kilograms (24 lb) (missile); 24.3 kilograms (54 lb) (system)
- Length: 1.39 metres (4 ft 7 in)
- Diameter: 76 millimetres (3 in)
- Crew: 1
- Effective firing range: 300 to 4,500 metres (980 to 14,760 ft) against jets to 5,500 metres (18,000 ft) against helicopters
- Warhead: High-explosive warhead
- Warhead weight: 2.74 kilograms (6.0 lb) (containing 0.6 kilograms (1.3 lb) of HE) with contact and proximity fuzes
- Detonation mechanism: Impact force or proximity fuze
- Engine: Solid fuel rocket
- Maximum speed: Mach 1.7+ approx.
- Guidance system: SACLOS system

Javelin also known as Thales Javelin, is a British man-portable surface-to-air missile, formerly used by the British Army and Canadian Army. It can be fired from the shoulder, or from a dedicated launcher named the Lightweight Multiple Launcher (LML), that carries three rounds, and can be vehicle mounted.

The missile is an updated version of the earlier Blowpipe of the 1970s. Blowpipe used a manual guidance system which proved hard to use effectively in combat during the Falklands War where only two destroyed aircraft could be definitively attributed to the system. Javelin replaced the manual guidance system with a semi-automatic command to line of sight (SACLOS) system that only required the operator to keep their gunsight pointed at the target. A tracking system in the launcher's optics compared the location of the missile to the line-of-sight and sent it commands over a radio link to guide it. This version entered service in 1984, and was later known as Javelin GL.

Further upgrades to the missile added a fully automatic guidance system to produce the Javelin S-15. This was sold commercially, and is better known, as the Starburst surface-to-air missile. These began to replace the GL in British Army service in 1993, although the GL remained in use as a training system. Both were replaced by Starstreak starting around 1997.

Javelin GL was hastily purchased by the Canadian Forces to replace the Blowpipes that failed last-minute tests during preparations for the deployment to the Persian Gulf for the First Gulf War (1990–1991). It was later replaced by the Javelin S15 until retired without replacement in 2005.

== History ==
The missile was developed as a replacement for the Blowpipe shoulder-launched antiaircraft missile, which was used in the Falklands War by both sides, and proved largely ineffective. Only two hits were recorded by the Blowpipe out of more than 100 launches: a British Harrier GR3 (XZ972) attacked by Argentine Army special forces (Commandos Company), and an Argentine Aermacchi MB-339 (0766 (4-A-114)) during the Battle of Goose Green.

== Operational use ==
Similar in overall appearance to the manual command to line of sight (MCLOS), radio frequency guided Blowpipe, Javelin is slightly smaller, uses semi-automatic command to line of sight (SACLOS) radio frequency guidance and is fitted with an improved warhead. The operator is equipped with a 6× magnification sight and a long range television (TV) camera to locate targets. Although the Javelin's accuracy is somewhat susceptible to smoke, fog, or clouds, it cannot be decoyed away from a target with flares because it does not use an infrared or ultraviolet (UV) spectrum seeker. It is potentially susceptible to infrared jammers such as the AN/ALQ-144.

== Operators ==
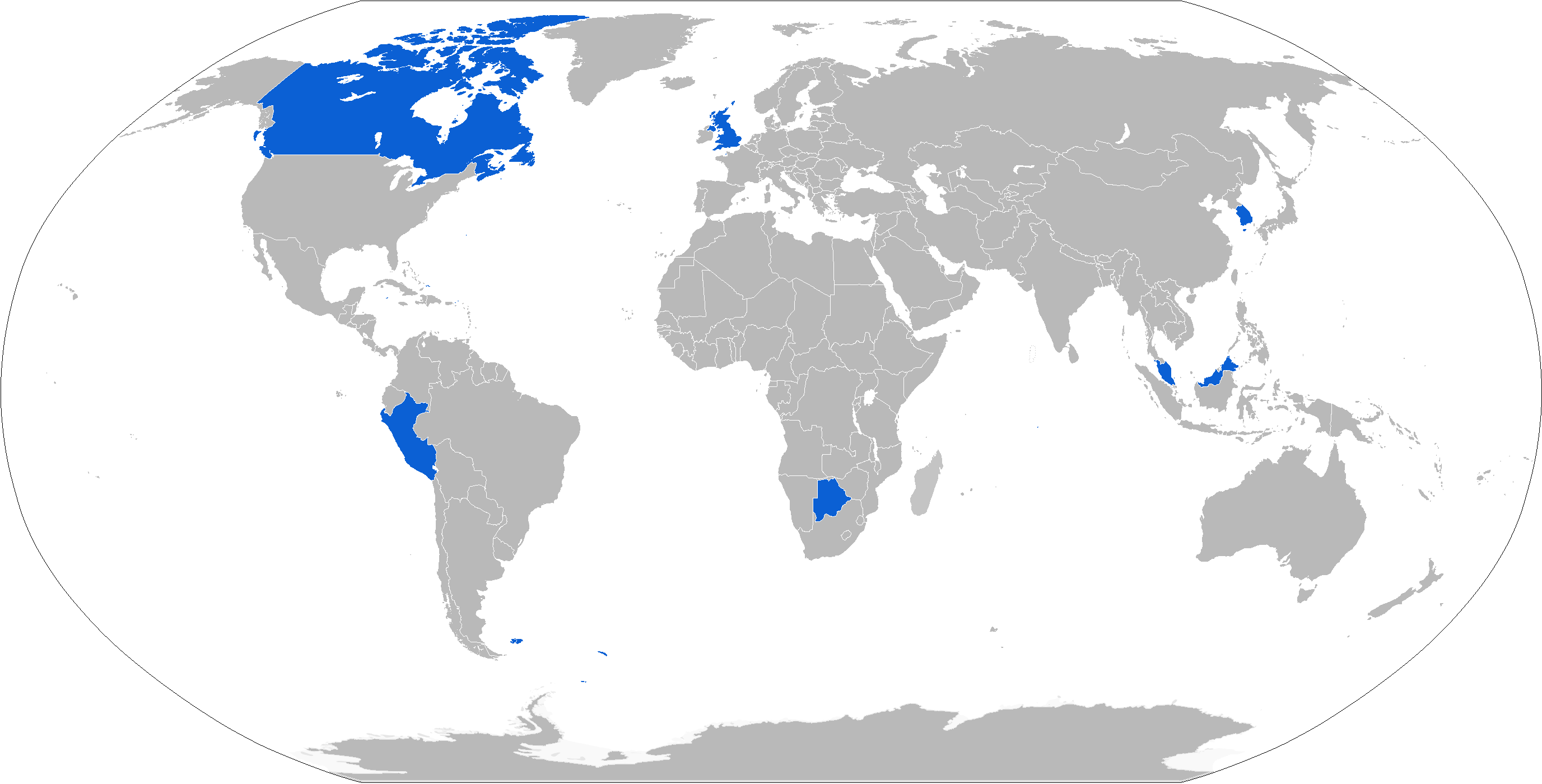
Map with Javelin operators in blue

=== Current operators ===
- Botswana: In 1991 the Botswana Defence Force procured 25 missiles with five launchers
- Peru: Peruvian Army
- South Korea: Republic of Korea Army

=== Former operators ===
- Canada:
  - Canadian Army
- Malaysia:
  - Malaysian Army
- United Kingdom
  - British Army
  - Royal Marines

== See also ==
- VSHORAD – (India)
- Anza – (Pakistan)
- Misagh-2 – (Iran)
- Qaem – (Iran)
