= Predicted line of sight =

Missile guidance method

Predicted line of sight (PLOS) is a missile guidance method used in anti-tank weapons such as the NLAW and FGM-172 SRAW.

In PLOS, the operator tracks the target with the missile launcher's sights for a short period (typically 3–5 seconds). The missile calculates the angular velocity of the target before launch, which the onboard software uses to extrapolate a curved flight path. By following this predicted path using inertial navigation, the missile remains on the LOS between the launcher and the target until intercept, engaging the target either by direct impact or via a proximity-fused warhead.

This fire-and-forget technique is conceptually similar to command to line of sight (CLOS), except that in PLOS no commands are issued after launch and neither the launcher nor the missile continues to track the target. Since PLOS does not rely on onboard seekers or post-launch command links, missiles are largely immune to soft-kill countermeasures such as IR smoke, laser dazzlers, jamming, and decoys.

PLOS is intended for engaging moving targets with relatively low maneuverability at short to medium ranges and with short engagement times. This limitation stems from guidance errors that accumulate over longer flights—errors from initial sighting inaccuracies, estimation of LOS angular velocity, the assumption of a constant angular velocity, missile control loop limitations, environmental disturbances such as wind, and inherent inaccuracies in the missile and its sensors.

== See also ==
- Command guidance
- Manual command to line of sight (MCLOS)
- Fire-and-forget
- NLAW
- FGM-172 SRAW
