= Thales Air Defence =

Aerospace defence contractor

Thales Air Defence Limited
- Formerly: Shorts Missile Systems
- Company type: Subsidiary
- Industry: Defence
- Headquarters: Belfast, Northern Ireland, United Kingdom
- Products: Missiles
- Number of employees: 492 (2017)
- Parent: Thales Group

Thales Air Defence Limited (TADL), formerly Shorts Missile Systems (SMS), is a defence contractor based in Belfast, Northern Ireland, producing short range air defence missiles.

Shorts Missile Systems was established as a joint venture between Shorts' owners Bombardier and Thomson-CSF in 1993. In 2000, Thomson-CSF became the sole owner. In the same year, Thomson-CSF was renamed Thales Group and in 2001, Shorts Missile Systems was renamed Thales Air Defence Limited.

TADL products have been deployed by 56 armed forces around the world. The company employs around 492 people in Northern Ireland. The company also operates a remote facility in rural County Down, between Ballynahinch and Downpatrick, where missiles are tested and stored.

== History ==
Short Brothers' missile division was formed in 1952. In 1993, this became Shorts Missile Systems (SMS) a joint venture between Shorts' owners Bombardier and Thomson-CSF. In 2000 Thomson-CSF bought Bombardier's 50% share to become the sole owner. In the same year Thomson-CSF was renamed Thales Group; consequently in 2001 Shorts Missile Systems was renamed Thales Air Defence Limited.

The then Shorts Missile Systems was a partner in Raytheon Company's Future Medium Range Air-Air Missile (FMRAAM) project, which was to replace the AIM-120 AMRAAM missile used by European air forces. In May 2000, the UK selected the MBDA Meteor to fulfil the requirement.

== Products ==
- NLAW

The NLAW is a lightweight anti-tank guided missile system that is assembled by Thales.

- Javelin

Javelin is a man-portable surface-to-air missile and is being replaced by Starstreak.

- Starstreak

A High Velocity Missile (HVM) used in the air defence role. Used in many roles with man-portable, attack helicopter and vehicle mounted variants.

- Hellfire

Built by Thales under licence from the United States for the Ministry of Defence. Hellfire is designed to defeat tanks and other individual targets while minimizing the exposure of the launch vehicle to enemy fire.

- Martlet

Lightweight Multirole Missile used by the Royal Navy's AgustaWestland AW159 Wildcat helicopter.

=== Historical ===
- Blowpipe
- Starburst

== See also ==
- Aerospace industry in the United Kingdom
