= Starburst (missile) =

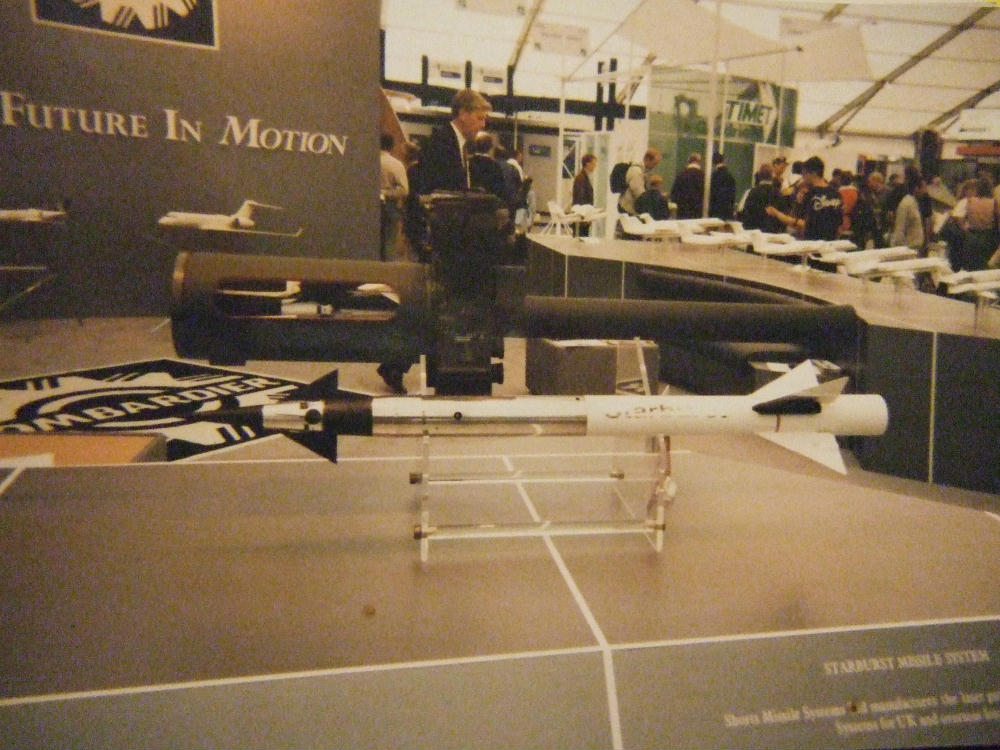
- Sample of Starburst
- Type: Man-portable air-defense system
- Place of origin: United Kingdom

Service history
- In service: 1990 to present
- Used by: See Operators
- Wars: Gulf War

Production history
- Designer: Thales Air Defence and Thomson-CSF
- Manufacturer: Thales Air Defence
- Produced: 1986 to 2001
- No. built: 13,389
- Variants: See Variants

Specifications (Missile)
- Mass: Missile: 15.2 kilograms (34 lb); Launcher: 8.5 kilograms (19 lb)
- Length: 139 centimetres (55 in)
- Diameter: 197 millimetres (7.8 in)
- Muzzle velocity: Mach 2
- Effective firing range: 0.5–7 kilometres (0.19–4.35 mi)
- Sights: Optical sight
- Warhead: High explosive fragmentation
- Warhead weight: 2.74 kg
- Guidance system: Beam-riding

Starburst was a British man-portable surface-to-air missile produced by Shorts Missile Systems of Belfast (since 2002 known as Thales Air Defence). It was used by the British Army (as Javelin S15), Malaysian Armed Forces, and in the Canadian Army as the Javelin until 2005. It can be fired from a single-fire shoulder launcher or from a launcher known as Starburst LML (Lightweight Multiple Launcher). These launchers can also be mounted on vehicles.

== Development and design ==
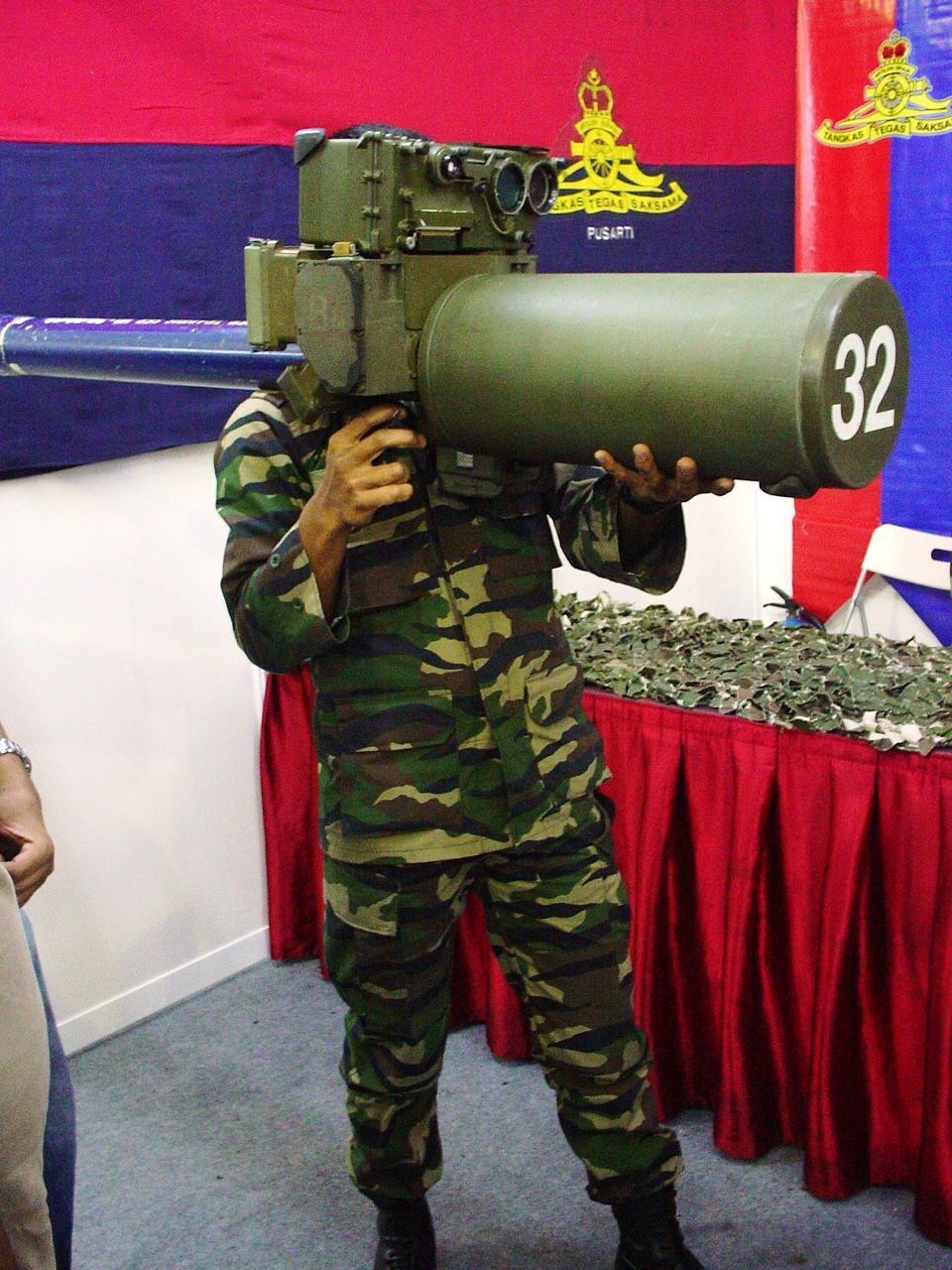
A Malaysian Starburst launcher held by a soldier during an exhibition

Development on the Starburst began in the mid-1980s to meet a requirement by the British Ministry of Defense. The missile was a development of the Javelin missile, retaining the Javelin missile body but replacing the radio command system with a beam-riding guidance similar to that used by the Starstreak missile that was already under development. This is much more difficult to jam than the radio-based system used by Javelin. The targeting system itself was developed by Thomson-CSF (now also a part of Thales Air Defense). The first shoulder-launched test firing took place in 1986 and development was completed in 1989.

The base form of the Starburst consists of two components– the missile in its launching tube and the clip-on targeting system. The missile itself has a two-stage motor that can be configured to detonate by proximity or on contact. The firing tube needs to be discarded after use, but the targeting system (developed by French electronics corporation Thomson-CSF) is reusable. The missile in its sealed container has a ten-year shelf life.

== Combat history ==
In 1989 the Starburst was accepted into British service and the first deliveries were made. It entered active service in 1990 and was deployed to protect British troops during the 1991 Gulf War. Notably, the system was deployed with the 10th (Assaye) Air Defense Battery of the 40th Regiment Royal Artillery.

== Variants ==
=== Starburst LML ===
The Starburst LML (Lightweight multiple launcher) is similar to the standard unit but uses three canistered missiles instead of the single missile on the base system. It retains the same clip-on aiming system.

=== Starburst VML / LML (V) ===
The Starburst VML (Vehicle multiple launcher), also referred to as the LML (V), is the vehicle-mounted version of the Starburst LML. It is almost identical to the similar vehicle mounting system for the Javelin missile, where a turret ring is fitted on to a vehicle's hatch opening and includes its own integrated hatch cover. The turret ring can traverse ±40° relative to its mounting point and includes a handgrip and frictional brake to allow the turret to precisely track a target. The VML has been mounted on the chassis of the Land Rover 4x4.

=== Starburst NML ===
The Starburst NML (Naval multiple launcher) is a version of the VML able to be placed on larger armored vehicles. The system consists of a leightweight tubular turret with a total of eight missiles assisted by optical and thermal imaging systems to allow operations during day and night. The NML has been fit on the M113 and Stormer HVM APCs.

=== Starburst SR2000 ===
With the cooperation of the defense company Radamec Defence Systems, Thomson-CSF and Thales developed the Starburst SR2000. This version is a turreted launcher able to fire six missiles with the Radamec 2400 electronic optical detection system. This system can detect and escort aircraft-type targets at ranges of up to 15 km day and night.

== Operators ==
=== Current operators ===
Canada
Kuwait
Kuwait Air Force: Ordered 48 launchers and 300 missiles. Training began in July 1995 in Belfast.
Qatar
Britain signed a deal on November 17, 1996 to sell Qatar starburst missiles as part of an 820 million dollar equipment package.
Thailand
United Kingdom
British Army: Replaced by Starstreak.

=== Former operators ===
Malaysia
Malaysian Army and Royal Malaysian Air Force: Replaced by the Starstreak.

=== Failed bids ===
Korea
Considered acquiring the Starburst in the 1990s but instead purchased 1,000 units of the French Mistral.

== See also ==
- Javelin – (United Kingdom)
- Anza – (Pakistan)
- Misagh-2 – (Iran)
- Qaem – (Iran)

== Bibliography ==
- Cullen, Tony; Foss, Christopher F., eds. (1992). Jane's Land-Based Air Defence 1992–93 (5th ed.). Coulsdon, UK: Jane's Data Division. ISBN 0-7106-0979-5. Archived from the original on 2012-06-05.
- Díez, Octavio (2000). Artillery and Missiles. Barcelona, Spain: Lema Publications. ISBN 84-95323-29-X.
- Jane's Land-Based Air Defence 2005–2006, ISBN 0-7106-2697-5
- Cordesman, Anthony H. (1997). Kuwait: Recovery and Security after the Gulf War. Boulder, Colorado, US: Westview Press. ISBN 0-8133-3243-5. Archived from the original on 2022-04-23.
- "Javelin Surface to Air Missile UK". Royal Canadian Artillery Museum. January 2017.
