= RBS 56 BILL =

RBS 56 BILL (Robot 56)
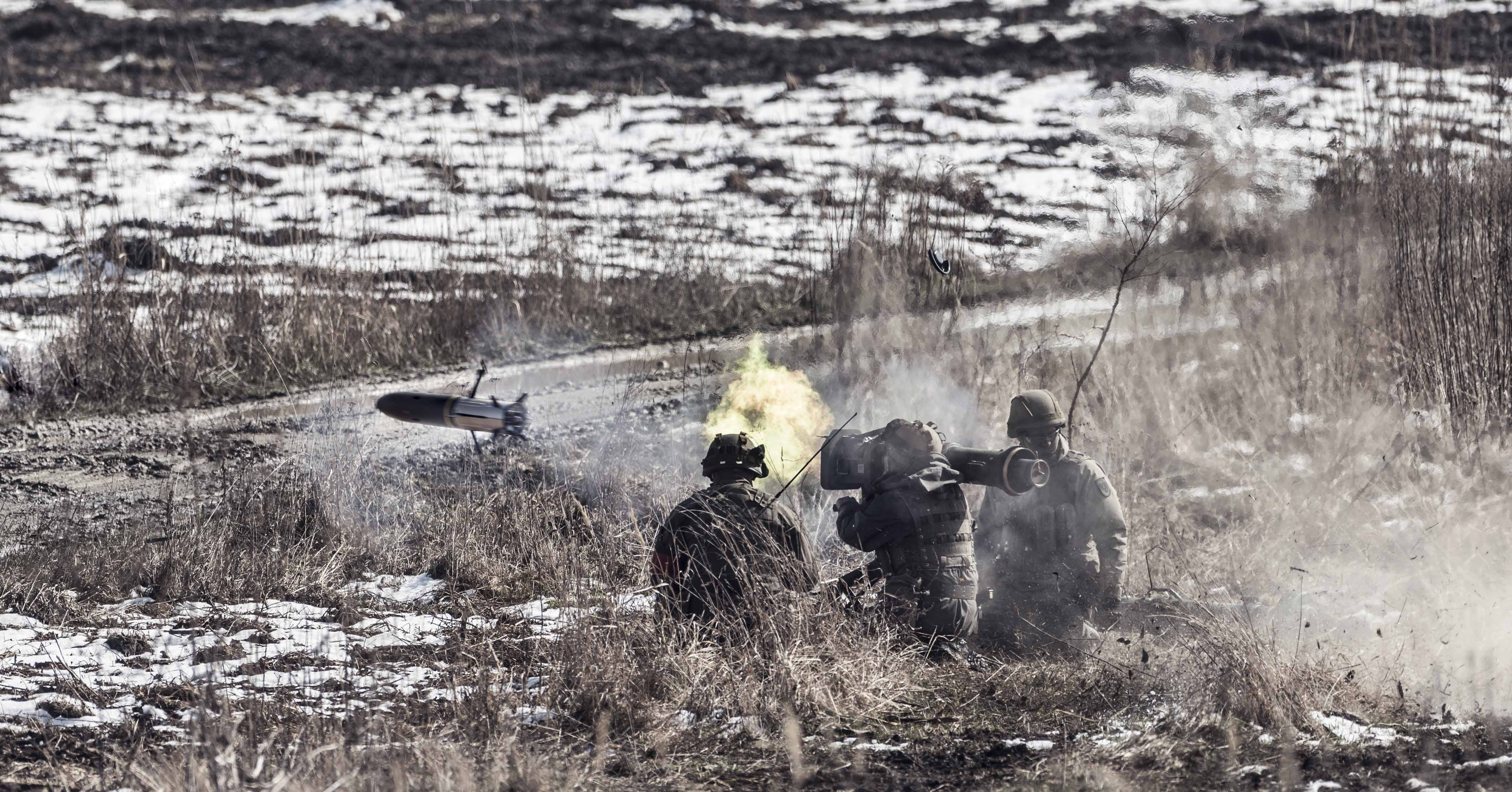
- Type: SACLOS Anti-tank missile
- Place of origin: Sweden

Service history
- In service: 1988 – present
- Used by: See Operators

Production history
- Manufacturer: Bofors
- Unit cost: $80,000 (1989)
- Produced: 1984 – late 1990s
- No. built: 15,000 +

Specifications
- Mass: 36 kg (launcher)
- Length: 900 mm
- Diameter: 150 mm
- Muzzle velocity: 250 m/s
- Effective firing range: 150 to 2,200 m
- Guidance system: SACLOS

The RBS 56 BILL is a Swedish man-portable SACLOS wire-guided anti-tank missile developed by AB Bofors.

== History ==
Development began in 1979 and BILL entered production in 1985. The Swedish Army began receiving the missile in March 1988. BILL stands for Bofors, Infantry, Light and Lethal.

By 1996, 15,000 missiles had been produced and supplied to the Swedish and Austrian armies. Between 1996 and 1997, Brazil received a number of BILL missiles.

In the late 1990s, production shifted to the RBS 56B BILL 2. The Swedish army received the first deliveries of the BILL 2 in 1999.

== Design ==
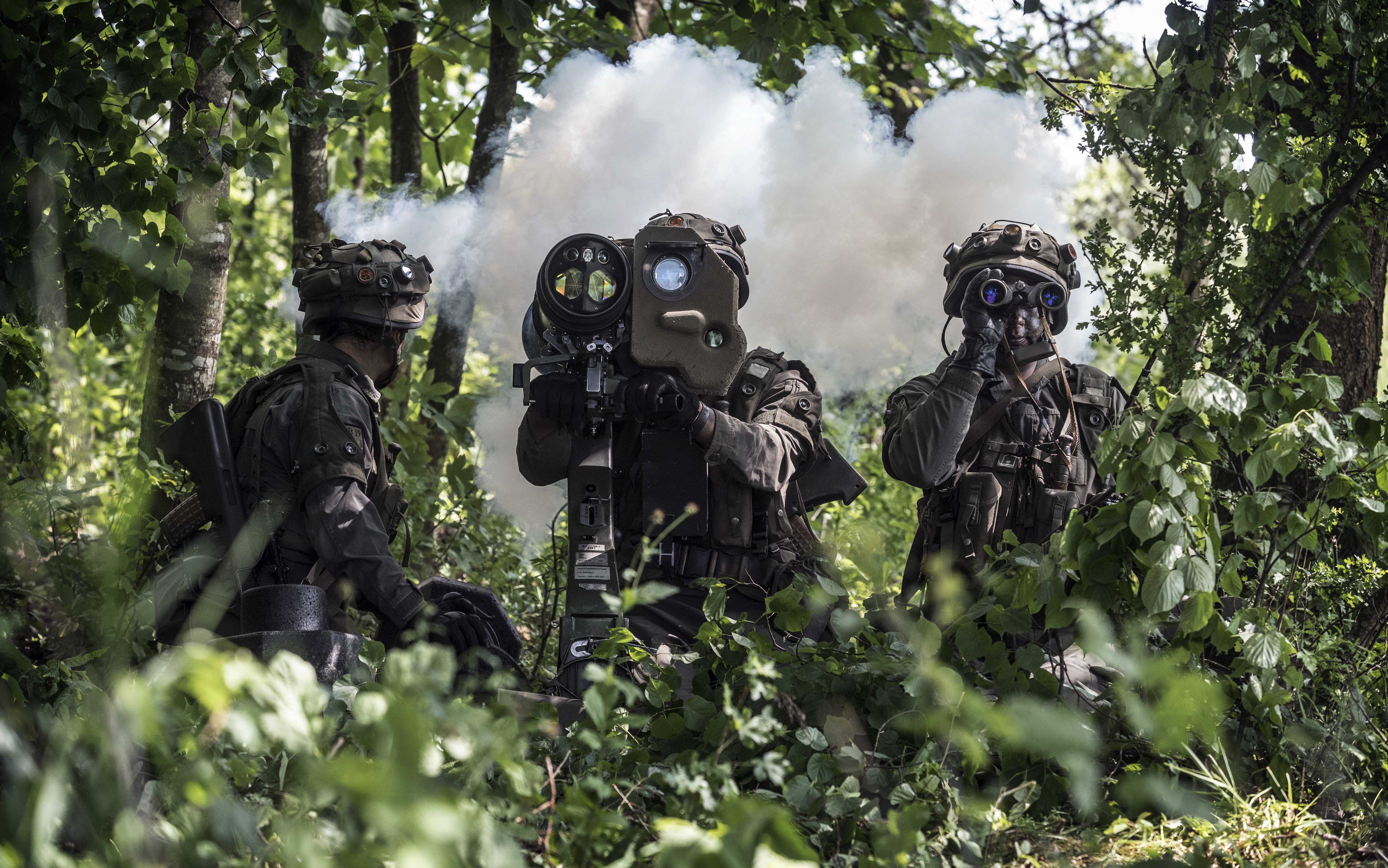
Austrian exercise

A man portable BILL system consists of a missile in a sealed launch tube, tripod, day sight and thermal night-vision sight. The missile's shaped charge warhead is aimed downwards at an angle of 30 degrees and is triggered by a proximity fuze as the missile passes over the intended target.

The overfly top-attack (OTA) warhead allows the missile to strike the thinner top armour of tanks. To enable this to work effectively the missile flies 0.75 meters above the line of sight between the launcher and the target. A secondary effect of this is to enable the missile to be used to engage targets largely behind cover, for example a hull down tank.

When launched the missile is propelled from the launch tube at around 72 meters per second by a gas generator at the rear of the launch tube. Once the missile is clear of the launch tube the sustainer motor engages and accelerates the missile to a speed of 250 meters per second. Once the missile is about 400 meters from the launcher, the sustainer motor cuts out and the missile continues in free flight.

== RBS 56B BILL 2 ==
=== Design ===
The RBS 56B BILL 2 is a man-portable or vehicle-mounted anti-tank missile designed upon the original BILL 1 Anti-tank guided weapon. The BILL 2 is currently produced by Saab Bofors Dynamics, who are located in Karlskoga, Sweden. The BILL 2 comes with one 10.5 kg missile, a launching tube, tripod with x7 magnification day sight, and one thermal imaging sight.

=== Firing modes ===
The BILL 2 has three firing modes that the launcher's operator can select, before launching the missile.

- Basic – In this mode the missile will use both of its sensors to hit the armoured vehicle from the top.
- Non-Armored – In this mode the missile uses no sensors and flies on a LOS or line-of-sight, while using the impact fuse.
- Soft Target – In this mode the optical sensor is used, but the magnetic sensor is not. The missile then uses OTA to attack its target.

=== Missile ===
The BILL 2 Missile uses a SACLOS or semi-automatic command to line-of-sight guidance system, and is controlled via a communications wire that trails behind the missile from the launch tube. The BILL 2 warhead has an optical and magnetic sensor. The optical sensor serves to find the target's range, while the magnetic sensor detects metallic targets to determine the best point for the missile to detonate.

The BILL 2 contains both a proximity fuse and an inertial impact fuse. The BILL 2 is armed with a pair of vertically striking explosively formed penetrator warheads, which each direct a self-forging slug of metal downwards at extreme velocities using a high explosive blast. The 40 mm frontal "precursor" warhead destroys any reactive armour protecting the target and leaves the 110 mm rear warhead to penetrate the armour.

== Operators ==
=== Current operators ===
- Ukraine: Ukrainian army
- Sweden: Swedish army, 1985–2013, 2021–
  - Re-acquired RBS 56 in 2021 in anticipation of the Swedish Armed Forces introducing a new, modern, medium-range anti-tank missile, with planned delivery from 2025.

=== Former operators ===
- Austria: through 2010, 3,000 purchased Known as Panzerabwehrlenkwaffe PAL 2000 BILL
  - 1,000 RBS-56 BILL ordered in 1989, delivered in 1989-1993
  - 2,000 RBS-56B BILL2 ordered 1996, delivered in 1998-2001
- Brazil: Marines
  - 100 RBS-56 BILL ordered in 1995, delivered in 1996-1997, phased out by 2025
- Estonia: Purchased in 2006.
- Latvia
- Saudi Arabia

== See also ==
- NLAW (Robot 57)
