= Man-portable anti-tank systems =

Weapon system designed for infantry use against tanks

Man-portable anti-tank systems (MANPATS / MPATS)
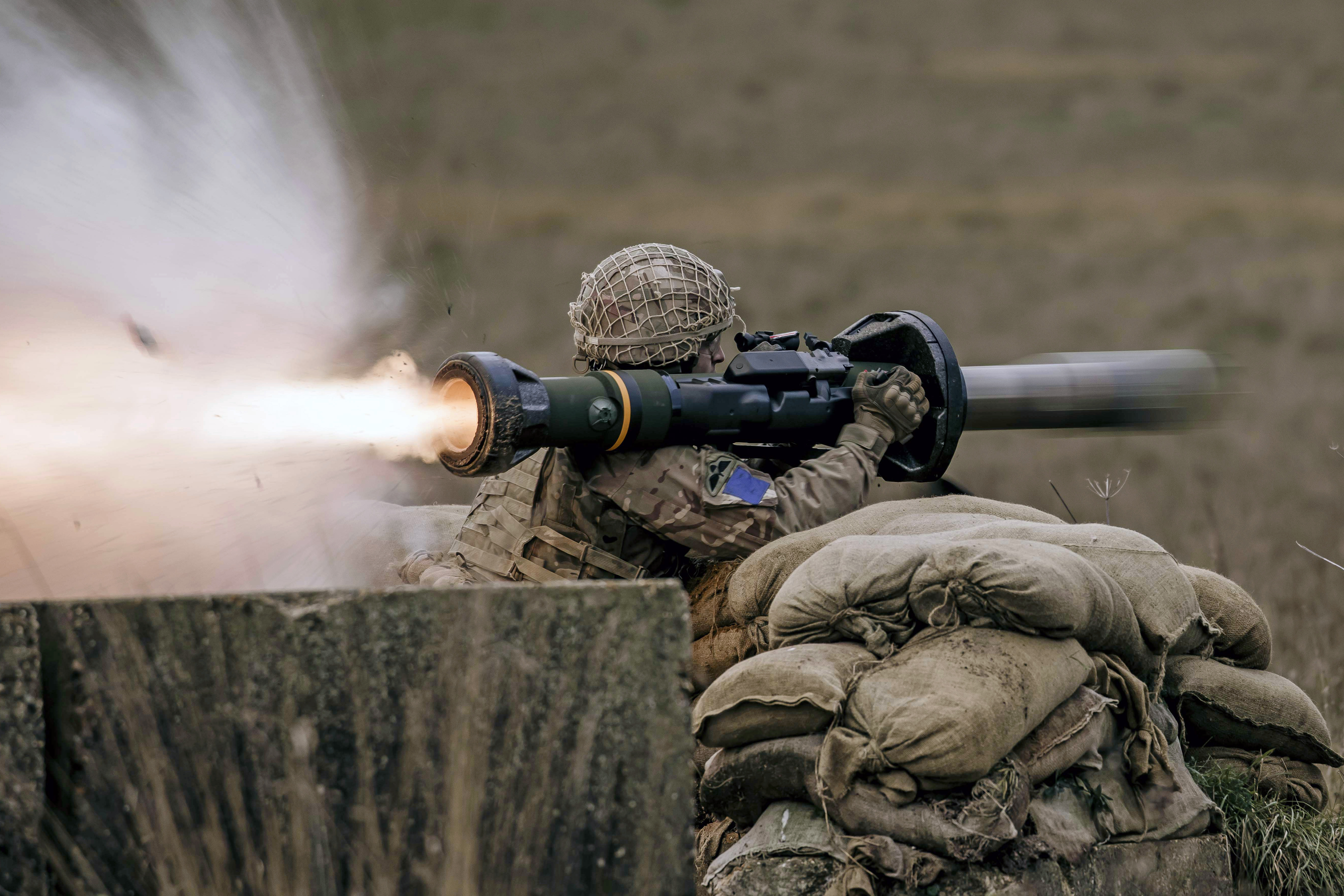
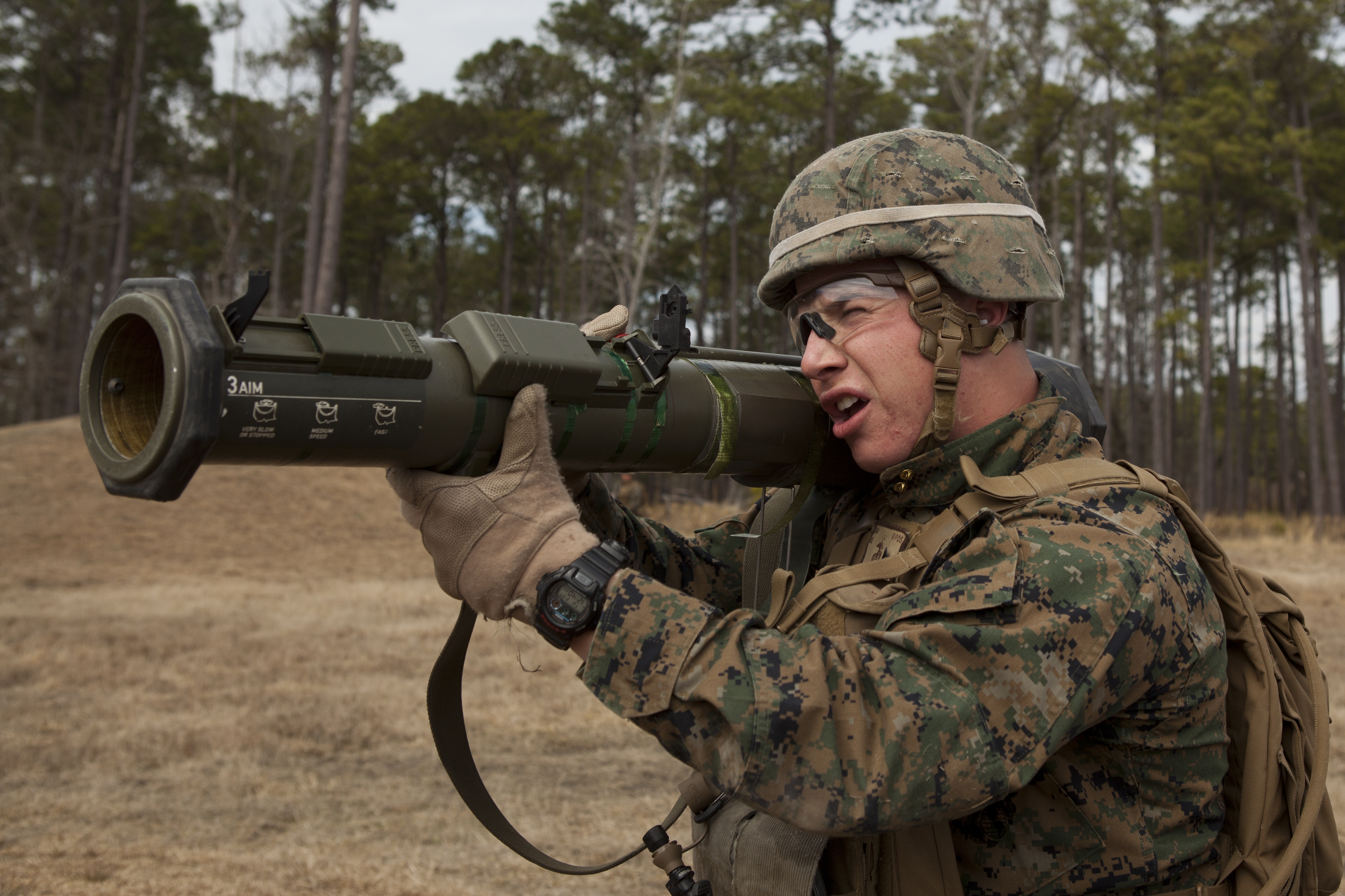
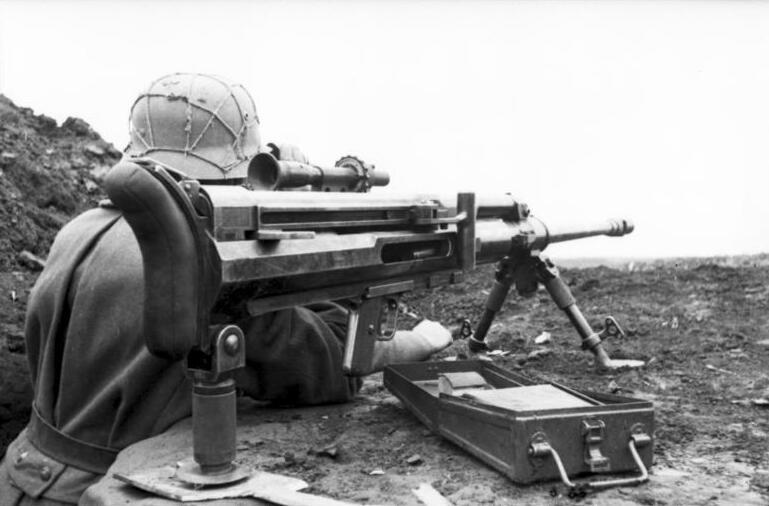
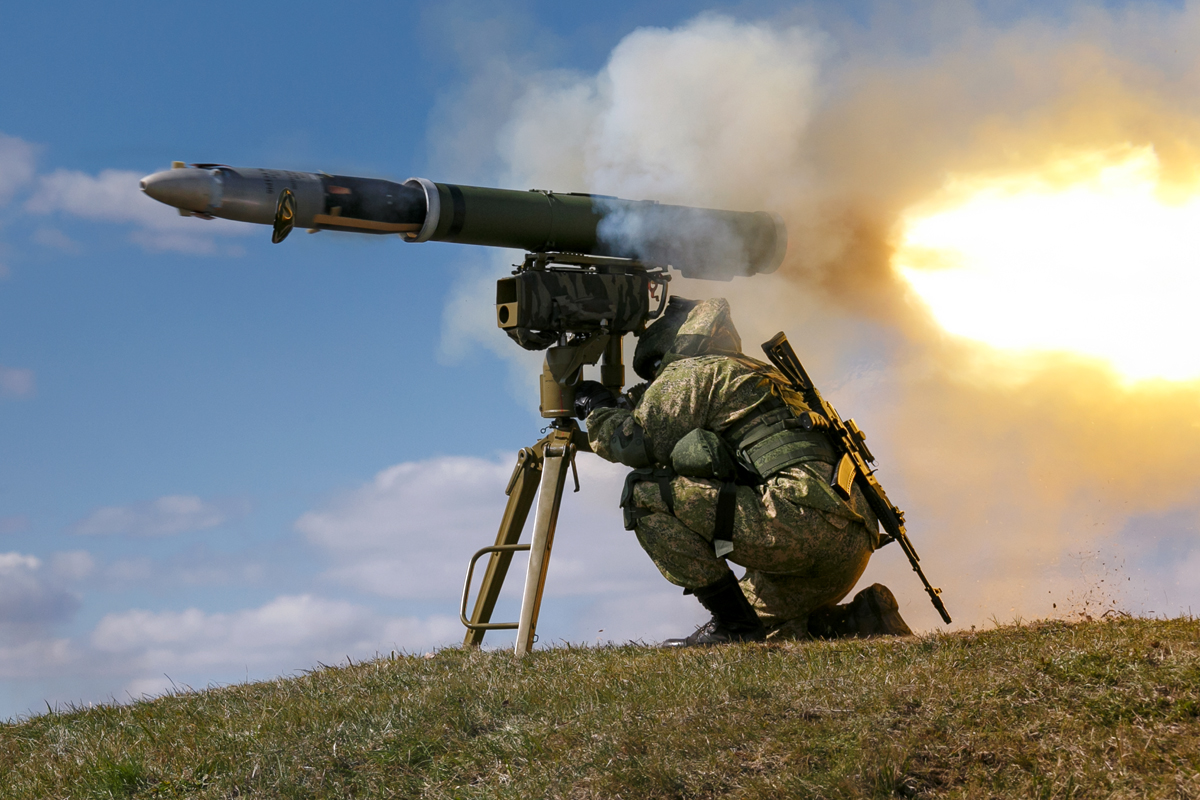
Upper left: NLAW single-use disposable anti-tank missile system.
Upper right: AT4 single-use disposable anti-tank launcher.
Lower left: Solothurn S-18/100 semi-automatic anti-tank rifle.
Lower right: 9M133 Kornet semi-disposable anti-tank missile system.

Man-portable anti-tank systems (MANPATS or MPATS) are traditionally portable shoulder-launched projectile systems firing heavy shell-type projectiles (although throwing and lunge weapons have existed), typically designed to combat protected targets, such as armoured vehicles, field fortifications and at times even low-flying aircraft (especially helicopters).

MPATS-launchers can be either unguided or guided weapons and generally fall into three distinct categories:

- Disposable systems, consisting of a small pre-loaded, single-shot launch tube meant to be disposed after firing, operated by one soldier. Examples include: Panzerfaust 1, M72 LAW, Miniman, AT4, NLAW, etc.
- Reusable systems, consisting of a reloadable firing system onto/into which a rocket or cartridge is loaded, operated by one or two soldiers. Examples include: bazooka, Panzerschreck, Carl Gustaf 8.4 cm recoilless rifle, RPG-7, Panzerfaust 2, etc.
- Semi-disposable systems, where the launcher is manufactured pre-loaded and issued as a single unit of ammunition meant to be launched from a reusable firing and sighting device and discarded after one use. Examples include, Bofors Bantam, BGM-71 TOW, 9M113 Konkurs, Panzerfaust 3, 9M133 Kornet, FGM-148 Javelin, etc.

Portable anti-tank systems initially appeared in the form of heavy rifles – so called anti-tank rifles – during the First World War and interwar period. These soon got replaced with recoilless systems with the application of the shaped charge explosive projectiles during the Second World War. The development of practical rocketry and recoilless cartridges occasioned by World War II provided a means of delivering such an explosive from a shoulder-launched weapon, leading to a new type of weapon family which combined portability with effectiveness against armoured vehicles, fortifications, and buildings. Famous early examples includes the American bazooka-family of reloadable rocket launchers, the German Panzerfaust single-shot disposable anti-tank launcher and the post war Swedish Carl Gustaf 8.4 cm recoilless rifle. The war also saw the use of a variety of unconventional MPAT-systems, such as the German Hafthohlladung magnet mine, the Japanese Shitotsubakurai lunge mine, the British sticky bomb hand grenade and PIAT direct fire spigot mortar.

== Anti-tank rifles ==
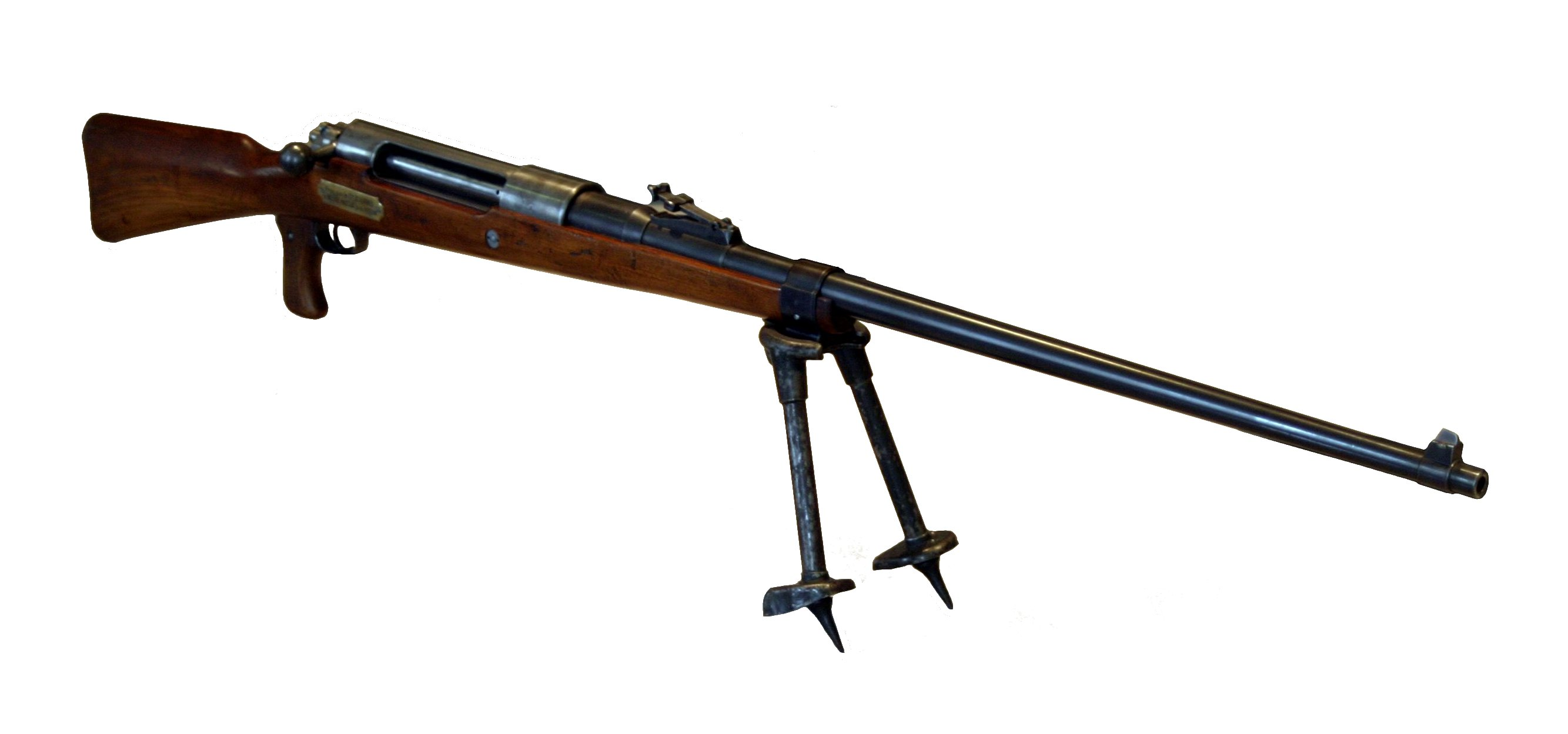
Mauser 1918 T-Gewehr 13.2x92mm anti-tank rifle at the Musée de l'Armée in Paris.

Arguably, the first MANPATS could be anti-tank rifles developed during World War I. An anti-tank rifle is a rifle designed to penetrate the armour of vehicles, particularly tanks. The usefulness of rifles for this purpose ran from the introduction of tanks in World War I and until the Korean War. While medium and heavy tank armour became too thick to be penetrated by rigid projectiles from rifles that one soldier could carry, anti-tank rifles continued to be used against other targets. Anti-materiel rifles of today, such as the Barrett M82, are a development of the Second World War technology. Although no longer able to penetrate even the side armour of the main battle tanks, they can cause serious damage to their external fittings such as periscopes and machine guns, and disable or even destroy less well armoured and support vehicles, helicopters, low-flying UAVs, and personnel.

== Rocket launchers ==
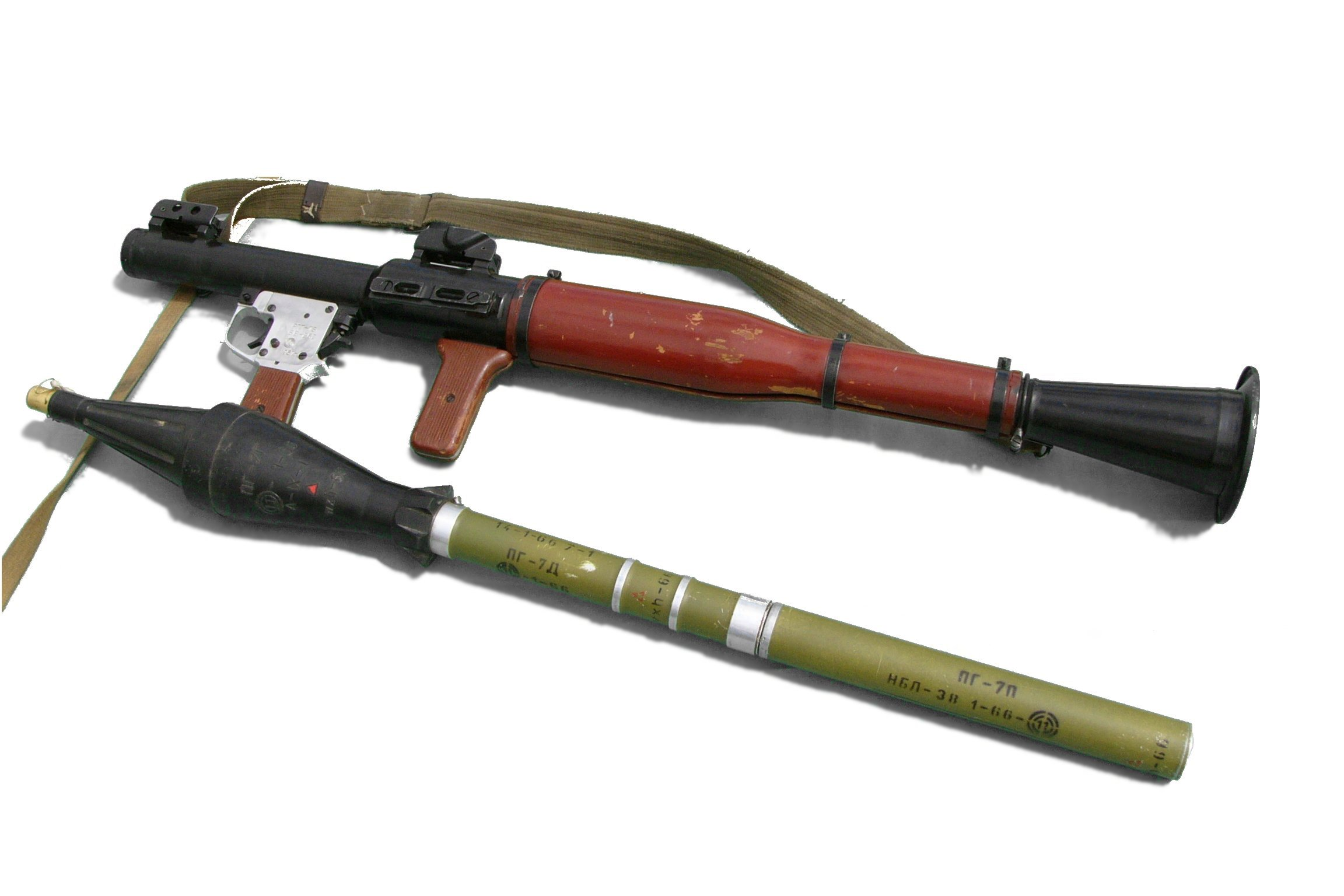
RPG-7 rocket launcher with shaped charge rocket.

One of the more common projectile types in MPAT-systems are rocket projectiles, commonly referred to as rocket-propelled grenades, a backronym originating from the Russian acronym RPG (Russian: РПГ: Ручной Противотанковый Гранатомёт, romanized: Ruchnoy Protivotankovy Granatomyot, lit. 'hand-held antitank grenade-launcher'), a name used for more than just rocket firing weapons. Rocket firing MPATS are conventionally called rocket launchers (alternatively man-portable rocket launchers when distinguishing them from vehicle ordnance) and are typically recoilless shoulder-launched systems firing high-explosive anti-tank rockets. These rockets typically consist of a high-explosive anti-tank warhead affixed to a rocket motor outfitted with areal stabilization-fins, typically folding fins.

The majority of rocket launchers are reloadable, but there is no rule against single-use weapons. Loading of the rockets is either done from the breech or the muzzle depending on the system.

=== History ===
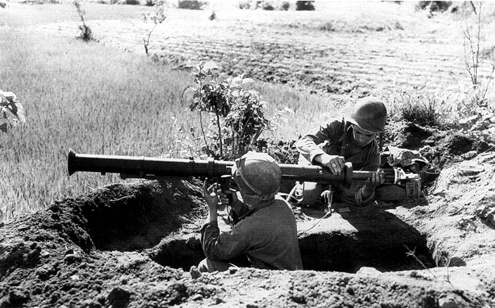
3.5-inch (90mm) M20 Super-Bazooka team in the Korean War.

The first man-portable rocket launcher to be mass-produced was the American 60 mm M1 rocket launcher, more commonly known as the bazooka. It was a man-portable, tube launched, recoilless rocket anti-tank weapon, widely fielded by the United States Army during World War II and into the Cold War. Also referred to as the "Stovepipe", the innovative bazooka was amongst the first generation of man-portable rocket launchers used in infantry combat. Featuring a solid rocket motor for propulsion, it allowed for high-explosive anti-tank (HEAT) warheads to be delivered against armoured vehicles, machine gun nests, and fortified bunkers at ranges beyond that of a standard thrown hand grenade. The bazooka also fired a high explosive squash head (HESH), effective against buildings and tank armour. The universally applied nickname arose from the M1 variant's vague resemblance to the musical instrument called a "bazooka" invented and popularized by 1930s U.S. comedian Bob Burns. The name bazooka was later applied to the 60 mm M9 "foldable" rocket launcher, which was followed by the 90 mm M20 rocket launcher being named "Super Bazooka". The bazooka concept was quickly copied by Nazi Germany and turned into the 88 mm Panzerschreck.

Today the most widely distributed and used rocket launcher in the world is the Soviet RPG-7. Its basic design was developed by the Soviets shortly after World War II in the form of the RPG-2, which used a recoilless cartridge solution instead of rockets.

== Recoilless rifles ==
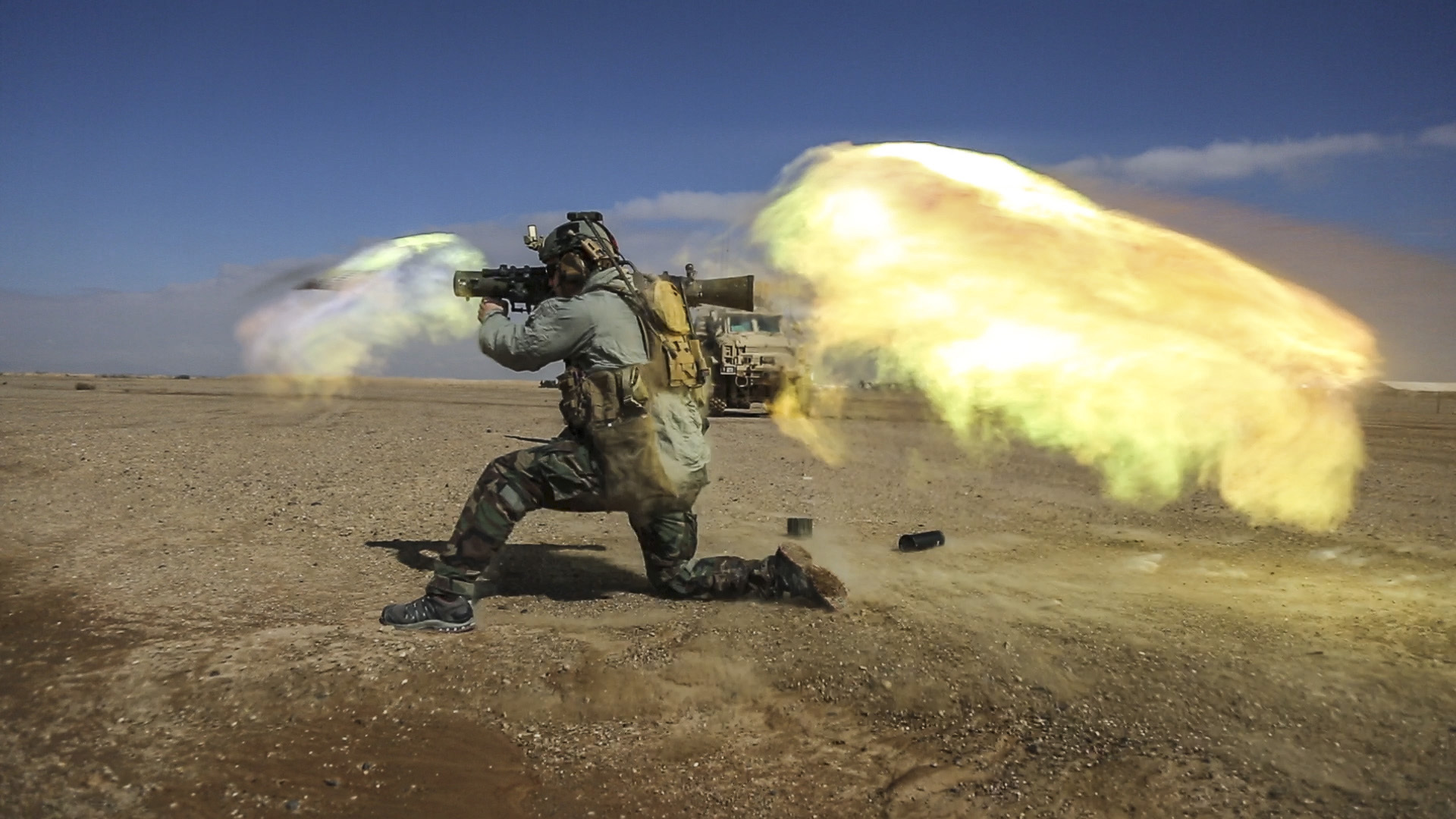
A recoilless rifle, such as this Carl Gustav recoilless rifle, produces a large backblast when fired

A recoilless rifle (RR) or recoilless gun is a type of lightweight artillery system or man-portable launcher that is designed to eject some form of counter mass, such as propellant gas, from the rear of the weapon at the moment of firing, creating forward thrust that counteracts most of the weapon's recoil. Technically, only devices that use a rifled barrel are recoilless rifles. Smoothbore variants are recoilless guns. This distinction is often lost, and both are often called recoilless rifles. Though similar to a rocket launcher, a recoilless weapon fires shells that use conventional gun propellant. The key difference from rocket launchers (whether man-portable or not) is that the projectile of the recoilless rifle is initially launched using conventional explosive propellant rather than a rocket motor. While there are rocket-assisted rounds for recoilless launchers, they are still ejected from the barrel by the detonation of an initial explosive propelling charge.

== Anti-tank missile ==
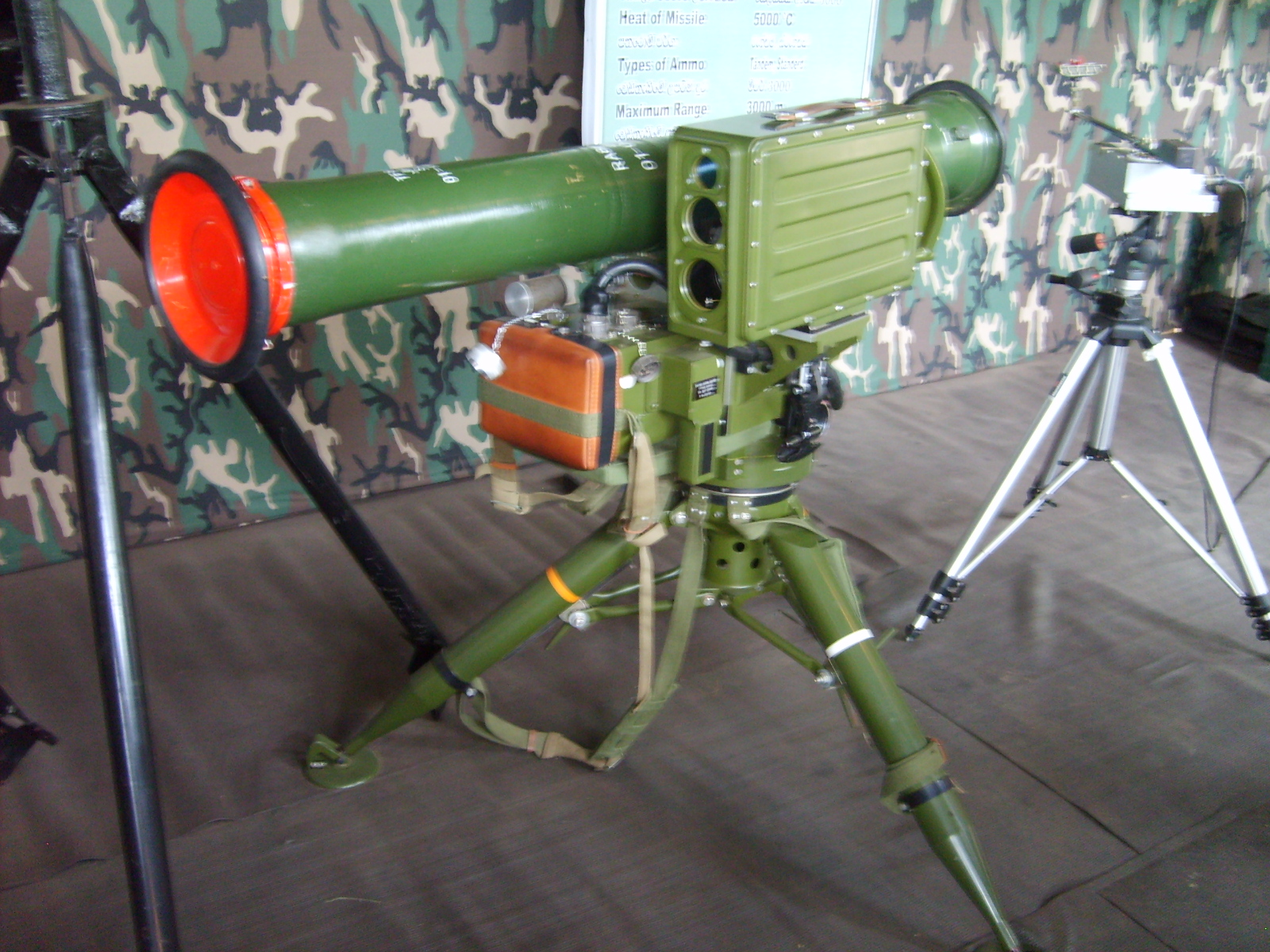
Baktar-Shikan Man portable Anti tank Guided Weapon

An anti-tank missile (ATM), anti-tank guided missile (ATGM), anti-tank guided weapon (ATGW), or anti-armour guided weapon is a guided missile primarily designed to hit and destroy heavily armoured military vehicles. ATGMs range in size from shoulder-launched weapons, which can be transported by a single soldier, to larger tripod-mounted weapons, which require a squad or team to transport and fire, to vehicle and aircraft mounted missile systems. The introduction of smaller, man-portable ATGMs, such as the M47 Dragon and FGM-148 Javelin, with larger warheads to the modern battlefield has given infantry the ability to defeat light and medium tanks at great ranges, though main battle tanks using composite and reactive armours have proven to be resistant to smaller ATGMs. Earlier infantry anti-tank weapons, such as anti-tank rifles, anti-tank missiles, and magnetic anti-tank mines, had limited armour penetration abilities and/or required a soldier to approach the target closely. See: List of anti-tank missiles.

== See also ==
- List of man-portable anti-tank systems
- Anti-tank grenade
- Anti-tank missile
- Lunge mine
- Mine shell
- PIAT
- Anti-tank rifle grenades
- Sticky bomb
- Sturmpistole/Pocket mortar

== Bibliography ==
- "Infantry Anti-Tank Weapons", Bayonet strength, 150m, archived from the original on 2008-07-31.
- "Hand grenade through rocket-propelled grenade", Weaponology (programme), Military Channel, 2008-11-18.
