= Saab Bofors Dynamics =

Swedish defence company

Saab Bofors Dynamics is a subsidiary of the Saab Group that specializes in military materiel such as missile systems and anti-tank systems. It is located in Karlskoga and Linköping, Sweden.

Its corporate heritage goes back to Bofors, a hammer mill, which was founded as a royal state-owned company in 1646. In 1873, this was converted to a modern corporate structure by becoming a "stock company", in Swedish an aktiebolag, that is a "limited company" or a "corporation". In 1999, Saab purchased the Celsius Group, by that time the parent owner of Bofors. In September 2000, SAAB sold their Bofors Weapon Systems, which produced the autocannon and tube artillery weapons, to United Defense Industries, while Saab retained their missile interests. Later BAE Systems acquired United Defense Industries.

The weapon systems include sensors based on radar, infrared, and lasers.

Several public campaigns, including civil disobedience actions, have targeted production sites as a protest against Swedish arms exports.

== Products ==
=== Ground Systems ===
==== Anti-armour systems ====
- AT4/AT4 CS anti-tank recoilless gun
- Carl-Gustaf M3 (M3 MAAWS) 84 mm anti-tank recoilless rifle
- RBS-56 Bill ATGM
- RBS 56 Bill 2 ATGM
- NLAW ATGM

==== Cannons ====
- Bofors 40 mm

==== Firearms ====
- Saab Bofors Dynamics CBJ-MS 9 mm PDW
- Ak 5C 5.56mm carbine rifle, standard issue in the Swedish Armed Forces

==== Surface-to-surface missiles ====
- Ground Launched Small Diameter Bomb (GLSDB)

==== Artillery shells ====
- Bonus
- M982 Excalibur

=== Naval Systems ===
==== Cannons ====
- Bofors 57 mm Naval Automatic Gun L/60
- Bofors 57 mm Naval Automatic Gun L/70

==== Anti-ship missiles ====
- RBS 15
- RBS 17

=== Aerial Systems ===
==== Anti-air systems ====
- Bofors 40 mm
- RBS 70 SAM system
- RBS 23 BAMSE SAM system
- ASRAD-R

==== Air-air missiles ====
- IRIS-T (international collaboration, Aircraft Interface Unit and Signal Processing Unit provided by Saab Bofors Dynamics)
- Meteor (international collaboration, active radar proximity fuze subsystem (PFS) provided by Saab Bofors Dynamics)

==== Cruise missiles ====
- Taurus KEPD 350

=== Saab Bofors Dynamics Switzerland GmbH ===
- STRIX 120 mm guided mortar round
- Thor 120 mm mortar ammunition
- Mortar Anti-Personnel Anti-Material (MAPAM) (60 and 81 mm mortar ammunitions)
- Akeron MP warhead
- SM-EOD (charges for demining)
