= M150 =

M150 or M-150 may refer to:

- M150 Penetration Augmented Munition, an explosive device
- M150 ACOG, a telescopic rifle sight used by the United States Army
- Mercedes-Benz M150 engine, an engine produced by Mercedes-Benz from 1938 to 1944
- M-150 (Michigan highway), a road in the United States
- M-150 (energy drink), an energy drink from Thailand
