= Missile approach warning system =

Avionics feature on military aircraft

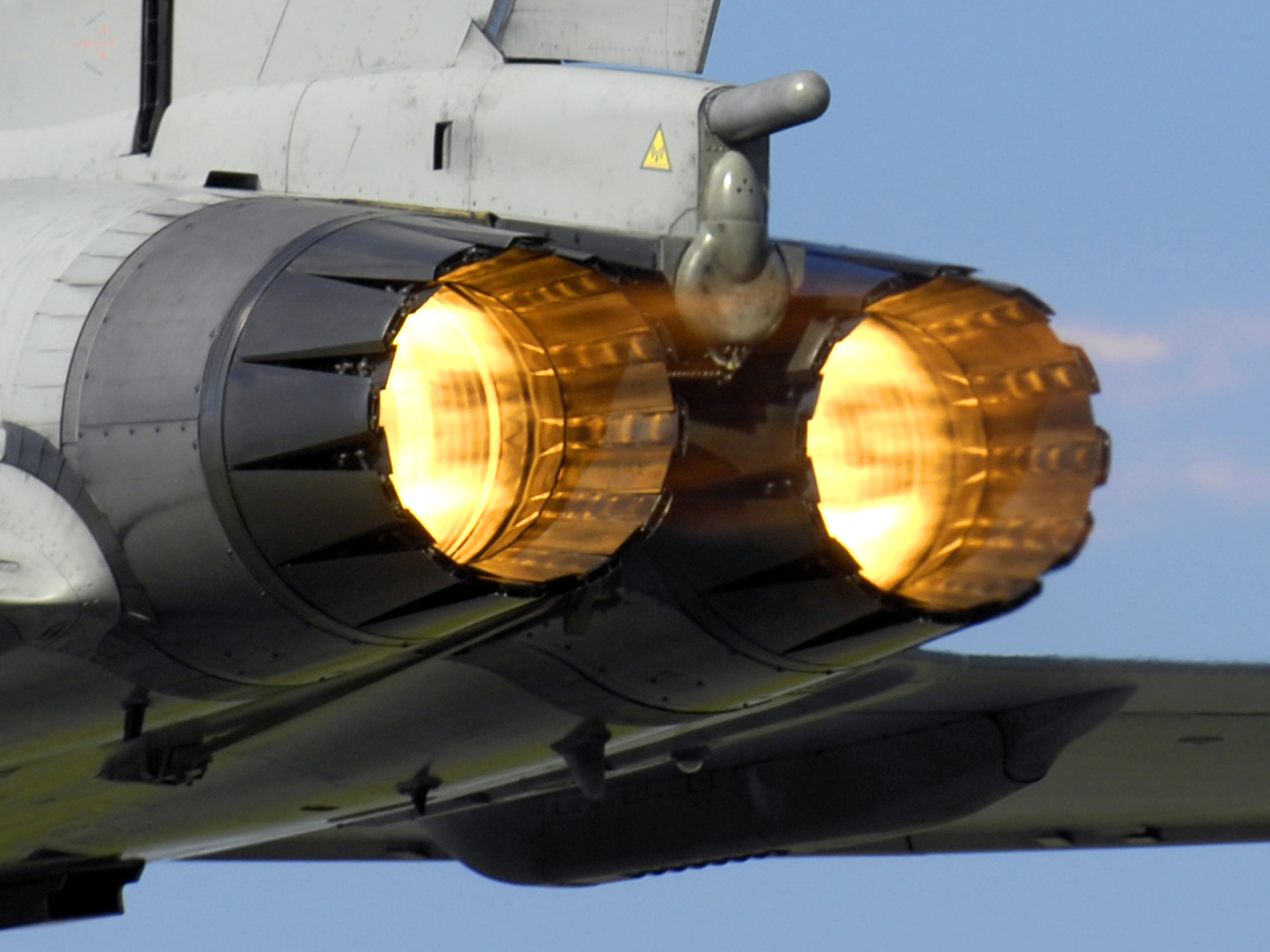
The cylindrical pod pointing backwards, just above the engines, is the missile approach warning receiver (part of Praetorian DASS)

A missile approach warning system (MAWS) is part of the avionics package on some military aircraft. A sensor detects attacking missiles. Its automatic warning cues the pilot to make a defensive maneuver and deploy the available countermeasures to disrupt missile tracking.

Guided surface-to-air missile (SAM) systems were developed during World War II and began to make their presence felt in the 1950s. In response, electronic countermeasures (ECM) and flying tactics were developed to overcome them. ECM proved to be quite successful provided that a reliable and timely threat warning was given.

== The infrared-seeking missile threat ==
The first air-to-air IR missiles appeared in the 1950s. Subsequent miniaturization enabled IR man-portable air-defense systems (MANPADS)—i.e., shoulder-launched missiles, to become operational in the 1960s.

Since the 1960s, 70% of aircraft lost to enemy action were downed by passive heat-seeking—i.e., infrared (IR)—guided missiles—not radar-guided SAMs that generally have longer engagement ranges, are faster, can maneuver more sharply, carry larger warheads, and have proximity fuzes. The early-1970s development of radar warning receivers helped pilots evade radar-guided missiles, while defenses against passive-IR-guided missiles appeared later.

IR MANPADS are relatively cheap, quite robust, easy to operate and difficult to detect. They also do not require the infrastructure, such as radar dishes, associated with radar-guided SAM deployments that often reveals their presence.

Vast quantities of MANPADS have been manufactured (as many as 700,000 produced since 1970). They proliferated during the Cold War and immediate post Cold War era. Substantial quantities are available and affordable on the black market and have found their way into the hands of "non state" organizations or the so-called "asymmetric" threat. (An estimate by Jane's Intelligence Review of February 2003 puts this number as high as 150,000). An article "Proliferation of MANPADS and the Threat to Civil Aviation" of August 13, 2003 by Jane's Terrorism and Insurgency Centre estimates that the black market price of MANPADS like the SA-7 could be as low as $5,000.

Intelligence regarding the whereabouts of MANPADS, especially in the hands of "non state" organizations, is usually vague and unreliable. This, in turn, makes it difficult to anticipate where and when to expect MANPADS attacks.

The 2nd- and 3rd-generation MANPADS that appeared by the 1980s further increased the performance and effectiveness of MANPADS due to advanced new seeker head technology, improved rocket motors, and aerodynamic refinements. Their performance improved in terms of lethal range, minimum launch angle, maneuvering potential and all aspect engagement angles (1st-generation MANPADS were restricted to only rear sector attacks). They also became more electronic countermeasure (ECM) resistant.

MANPADS therefore became even more lethal specifically against more vulnerable platforms such as helicopters, light aircraft, and commercial and military transport aircraft (during approaches and departures). The slower speed of these platforms forces them to spend more time within the kill zones of MANPADS compared to high performance fighter and strike aircraft.

Over fifty MANPADS attacks on civilian aircraft are on record to 2007. Thirty-three were shot down killing over 800 people in the process.

== Missile approach warning (MAW) system requirements ==
Protecting aircraft against IR guided missiles depends in most cases firstly on reliable detection and warning of missiles and secondly on applying effective ECM.

An exception to this are omni-directional IR jammers which do not make use of missile warning at all, as they simply radiate modulated IR energy for as long as they are switched on. These jammers have been around since the 1970s and when the correct jamming modulation techniques were applied, were reasonably effective against 1st-generation amplitude-modulated MANPADS, which operated in the near-IR band (1 to 2 micrometres (μm)). The arrival of 2nd- and 3rd-generation MANPADS changed that. They operate in the mid-IR band (3 to 5 μm) and use more advanced modulation techniques (for example frequency modulation). Instead of jamming these missiles, the omni-directional IR jammer became a source for the missiles to home in.

=== Functional requirements ===
Providing timely warning against IR MANPADS is a challenge. They give no warning of their presence prior to launch, they do not rely on active IR, radar guidance or a laser designator, which would possibly emit a detectable radiation. They are typically fire-and-forget and can lock on and engage a target, speed to the target and destroy it in seconds. They have a small but visible radar signature and also a propellant which burns – depending on the platform, typically for a very short duration.

MANPADS are relatively short-range weapons, typically up to about five kilometers with the heart of the kill envelope one to three kilometers. They therefore allow very little margin for error to effectively counter them as the time to impact (TTI) on a target at one kilometer, is only about three seconds. The TTI for targets at three and five kilometers is also relatively short – only seven to a little over eleven seconds respectively.

The MAW must provide reliable and timely warning to allow appropriate counter measure responses. Near 100% probability of warning (POW) and very fast reaction times to counter nearby missile launches (in the order of one second) are essential.

Air crew will rely on the system only if they have high confidence in it. The MAW must also have sufficiently low false alarm rates (FAR), even when illuminated by multiple sources (which may include threats) from different directions.

Quick response times and low FAR are inherently conflicting requirements. An acceptable solution requires a balanced approach to provide the most successful end result without compromising the POW. Since a longer time-to-impact (TTI) warning is almost invariably desirable, this leads to the conclusion that there is something like a too-low FAR: all warning systems gather data, and then make decisions when some confidence level is reached. False alarms represent decision errors, which (assuming optimal processing) can be reduced only by gathering more information, which means taking more time, inevitably resulting in a reduced time-to-impact. Most users would tolerate an increased FAR (up to some point where it starts limiting operations) instead of a reduced TTI, because their probability of survival depends fairly directly on the TTI, which represents the time in which countermeasures can be deployed.

Accurate azimuth and elevation angle of attack (AOA) information can be another very important requirement. Directional IR counter measures (DIRCM) systems depend on MAW systems for accurate enough initial pointing (about two degrees) to ensure that the DIRCM acquires and engages incoming missiles timely and successfully.

Accurate AOA is also important in deciding the dispensing direction of the counter measure decoys (flares). It is vital to avoid the situation where the platform and the dispensed decoys both remain within the instantaneous field of view (IFoV) of incoming missiles. In situations like that missiles could very well, once they pass the decoys, still hit the platform. This is of particular importance where separation between the decoys and the platform takes too long as is the case with slow flying aircraft.

Accurate AOA is further important where the platform should preferably maneuver when dispensing decoys to increase the miss distance. This is more applicable to fast jets where their high speed tends to negate the separation caused by the decoy's ejection velocity. A turn towards approaching missiles to establish/increase the angle between the decoy and the platform is especially important in cases where a missile approaches from the rear between the five or seven 'o clock sectors. If the AOA is not accurate enough, the pilot could very well turn in the wrong direction and set himself up for the situation as described above.

The system must also be fully automated as the human reaction time in relevant cases (short range launches) is too long.

=== Physical requirements ===
Light aircraft, helicopters, and fighters usually have limited space and mass capacity for additional equipment. The system may also cause adverse aerodynamic drag which demands minimal physical size and number of boxes. The power consumption must further be kept within the capacity of the platform's electrical system.

=== Human-machine interface (HMI) requirements ===
Integrated display and control functions are desirable to avoid duplication on instrument panels where space is limited. If a platform is equipped with both radar and missile warning systems, the HMI should display both threats clearly and unambiguously.

The integrated HMI must also indicate the system's operating status, serviceability status, mode of operation, remaining decoy quantities etc. Separate control panels are justified only for safety of flight purposes such as ECM on/off and decoy jettison functions.

=== Cost considerations ===
Procuring electronic warfare (EW) self-protection systems has direct and indirect cost implications.

Direct costs involve the initial price of the system, spare parts as well as test equipment to ensure that the performance and availability of the systems is maintained throughout their entire life cycle.

Installing and integrating EW systems on aircraft is another direct cost

Indirect cost on the other hand involves degradation of the aircraft's performance as a result of having the system on-board which in turn impacts negatively on the operating cost of the aircraft.

The lowest initial price of a system does therefore not necessarily offer the best solution as all the factors needs to be considered. The overall cost effectiveness of systems i.e. price versus performance is more important in deciding which system to select.

== Types of MAW systems ==
Three different technologies have been used for MAW systems, i.e. systems based on: Pulse-Doppler radar, Infrared, and Ultraviolet. Each technology has its advantages and disadvantages which can be summarized as follows:

=== Pulse-Doppler–based MAW ===
Advantages

- Can measure distance and speed of approaching missiles. It can therefore determine the time to impact (TTI) and optimize the timing of countermeasure (flare) dispensing.
- Does not depend on the propulsion unit of missiles to be burning.
- Less sensitive to weather conditions.

Disadvantages

- In sophisticated threat environments, active systems could reveal the aircraft's presence with the radar radiation by the MAW and therefore increase its vulnerability.
- Detection range of small missiles with low radar cross section like MANPADS is limited and could result in marginal warning time and consequent late decoy dispensing.
- Cannot measure direction accurately enough to direct DIRCM systems.
- Susceptible to false alarms caused by other RF sources.
- Can cause interference with ground air traffic control radars if operating frequency is not selected carefully.
- More difficult to integrate than passive systems due to spatial limitations.

=== Infrared-based MAW ===
Advantages

- In good weather conditions, the atmospheric transmission of IR radiation tends to be better than that of solar-blind UV radiation.
- Can potentially achieve longer detection ranges at altitude where there is no ground clutter.
- Can potentially detect the kinetic heat of missiles after motor burnout at altitude, but probably not at low level due to high IR background clutter.
- Provides good AOA information for pointing a DIRCM and good decision making regarding decoy dispensing direction and maneuvering.

Disadvantages

- Very low IR transmission through liquid water and ice, which precludes all-weather operation. Even a few tens of micrometers of water on the lens, or in the atmosphere between the threat and the sensor, is sufficient to effectively blind both MWIR and LWIR sensors.
- Must compete with massive amounts of natural (sun) and man-made IR clutter.
- False alarm rate and/or probability of warning is therefore a huge problem against surface-to-air missiles due to high IR background clutter originating from the earth.
- Needs vast computing power to alleviate false alarm problem which in turn drives up cost.
- Two colour detectors are used in some systems to assist in the suppression of background clutter and lower FAR. Even though it solves some problems, it creates others as it complicates the system further due to the optical, sensitivity and extremely high pixel rate requirements which impact negatively on cost and reliability.
- Cannot provide actual range information.
- Traditionally IR detectors have very narrow instantaneous fields of view to achieve good enough signal to target ratio. Large detector arrays are therefore required to provide 360° azimuth coverage which is another cost driver.
- Requires cooled detectors which complicates life cycle logistic support and result in high cost of ownership.
- Detection range could be limited against future new technology low IR/UV emission rocket motors.

=== Ultraviolet-based MWS ===
Advantages

- Operates in solar blind UV spectral wavelength region and therefore has no natural (sun) false alarms. UV based MAW systems therefore have a much reduced false alarm problem to solve compared to IR based systems.
- Very good probability of warning in high clutter background environments.
- All-weather operation, as it is impervious to solar clutter, and hardly affected by liquid water.
- Wide instantaneous field of view.
- Provide very good AOA information for good decoy dispensing decision making, maneuvering and for pointing DIRCMs.
- Has fast response time against nearby missile launches.
- Is a simpler system than pulse Doppler & IR technologies.
- Does not require cooling and needs only moderate computing power.
- Low life cycle cost.

Disadvantages

- To detect approaching missiles, the rocket motor of the missile must be burning – it requires the high effective burning temperatures associated with solid fuel rocket motors.
- IR-based systems are probably better at altitude but UV is better against surface-to-air missiles.
- Cannot provide actual range information but can derive TTI from the rapid increase in amplitude of the approaching missile's signal.
- Detection range could be limited against future new technology low IR/UV emission rocket motors.

== Implementations of MAW systems ==
Current available MAW systems as well as those under development, represent all three types of technologies. Each technology has strong and weak points and none provide a perfect solution.

=== Pulse-Doppler radar-based ===
Israel
- EL/M-2160 (AN/ALQ-199) from Elta
- Airborne Suite from Elbit Systems
Italy / United Kingdom
- Amids from Selex and Elettronica (component of Praetorian DASS, developed from PVS 2000)
Japan
- J/APQ-1 from Mitsubishi Electric Corporation
Russia
- LIP MAW (obsolete system)
- Arbalet-D from Phazatron Niir Corporation
South Korea
- K2 MWR from Agency for Defense Development (ADD)
United Kingdom
- PVS 2000 originally from GEC-Marconi and Plessey Avionics (now Selex and Thales; obsolete system)

United States
- AN/ALQ-127 originally from Westinghouse (now Northrop Grumman; obsolete system)
- AN/ALQ-153 originally from Westinghouse (now Northrop Grumman; obsolete system)
- AN/ALQ-154 from AIL (obsolete system)
- AN/ALQ-156 from BAE Systems EI&S

=== Infrared-based ===
France
- DDM-SAMIR/DDM-NG from Sagem and MBDA
- MWS-20 Damien from Dassault Electronique (now Thales)

France / Germany
- MIRAS from Hensoldt (Hensoldt Holding GmbH), Thales and Airbus DS GmbH

Germany
- PIMAWS from BGT (uncertain of production/development status)
India
- DCMAWS from DARE (lab of DRDO).
Israel
- PAWS/PAWS-2 from Elisra (subsidiary of Elbit)
Italy
- Leonardo MAIR
Russia
- President-S (BKO) from KRET and Scientific-Research Institute Ekran
South Korea
- KUH/MUH MWR from Huneed Technologies
Turkey
- IRIS 200 from Aselsan
United Kingdom
- ELIX-IR from Thales UK (uncertain of production/development status)
United States
- AN/AAQ-37 Distributed Aperture System (DAS) from Northrop Grumman & Raytheon for F-35 Lightning II (operational)
- AN/AAR-44B from L-3 Cincinnati Electronics for AC-130U Spooky II
- AN/AAR-47 by Loral Corporation, et al.
- AN/AAR-56 from Lockheed Martin for F-22 Raptor (operational)
- JATAS (Joint & Allied Threat Awareness System) under development by Alliant Techsystems (ATK) and BAE Systems under a US Navy contract, with initial operational deployment scheduled for late 2015
- MIMS from Northrop Grumman (uncertain of development/production status)

=== Ultraviolet-based ===
Germany
- AN/AAR-60 or MILDS (Missile Launch Detection System) from Hensoldt Holding GmbH.
India
- UVMAWS from DRDO
Israel
- Guitar – 350 from Rafael (Uncertain of production/development status)
Russia
- 101KS-U part of the 101KS Atoll electro-optical (EO) system for the Russian Air Force Su-57 fifth generation aircraft.
South Africa / Sweden
- MAW 300 from Saab Avitronics
Turkey
- IRIS 100 from Aselsan
United States
- AN/AAR-47 with upgraded AN/AAR-47A(V)2 sensors.
- AN/AAR-54 originally from Westinghouse (now Northrop Grumman)
- AN/AAR-57 originally from Sanders (now BAE Systems EI&S)

== See also ==
- Sukhoi Su-30MKM MAW-300
- Radar warning receiver
- Infrared homing (passive missile guidance system)
- Directional infrared counter measures
- Electronic counter-countermeasures
- Active radar homing
- List of military electronics of the United States
