= Laser warning receiver =

Military warning system

A laser warning receiver is a warning system used as a passive military defence. It detects, analyzes, and locates directions of laser emissions from laser guidance systems and laser rangefinders. Then it alerts the crew and can start various countermeasures, like smoke screen, aerosol screen (e.g. Shtora), active laser self-defence weapon with laser dazzler (LSDW, used on the Chinese Type 99 main battle tank), laser jammer, etc.

Detectors used in LWR are usually based on a semiconductor photodetector array, which is typically cryogenically or thermal-electric cooled. Sometimes avalanche photodiodes (APD), photoconductivity, photoelectromagnetic, or photodiffusion devices are used even without cooling. Some devices detect only the main beam of foreign lasers while others detect even scattered rays.

== Produced by ==
France
- Thales Optronics
Germany
- Hensoldt
Israel
- Elbit Systems
Pakistan
- Global Industrial Defence Solutions
South Korea
- Hanwha Systems
Turkey
- ASELSAN
- NERO Industry
United Kingdom
- BAE Systems

== Models ==
Some of the most newer laser warning systems used by the United Kingdom are:

- LASERD MAX
- LASERD MICRO

Some models used by US are listed:

- AN/AVR-2 and AN/AVR2A
- AN/AAR-47
- AN/VVR-1
- AN/VVR-2

Some models used by US are listed:

- AN/AVR-2 and AN/AVR2A
- AN/AAR-47
- AN/VVR-1
- AN/VVR-2

== See also ==
- Radar warning receiver
