= AN/AAR-47 Missile Approach Warning System =

Military aircraft missile approach warning system

AN/AAR-47 MAWS
- Missile approach warning system
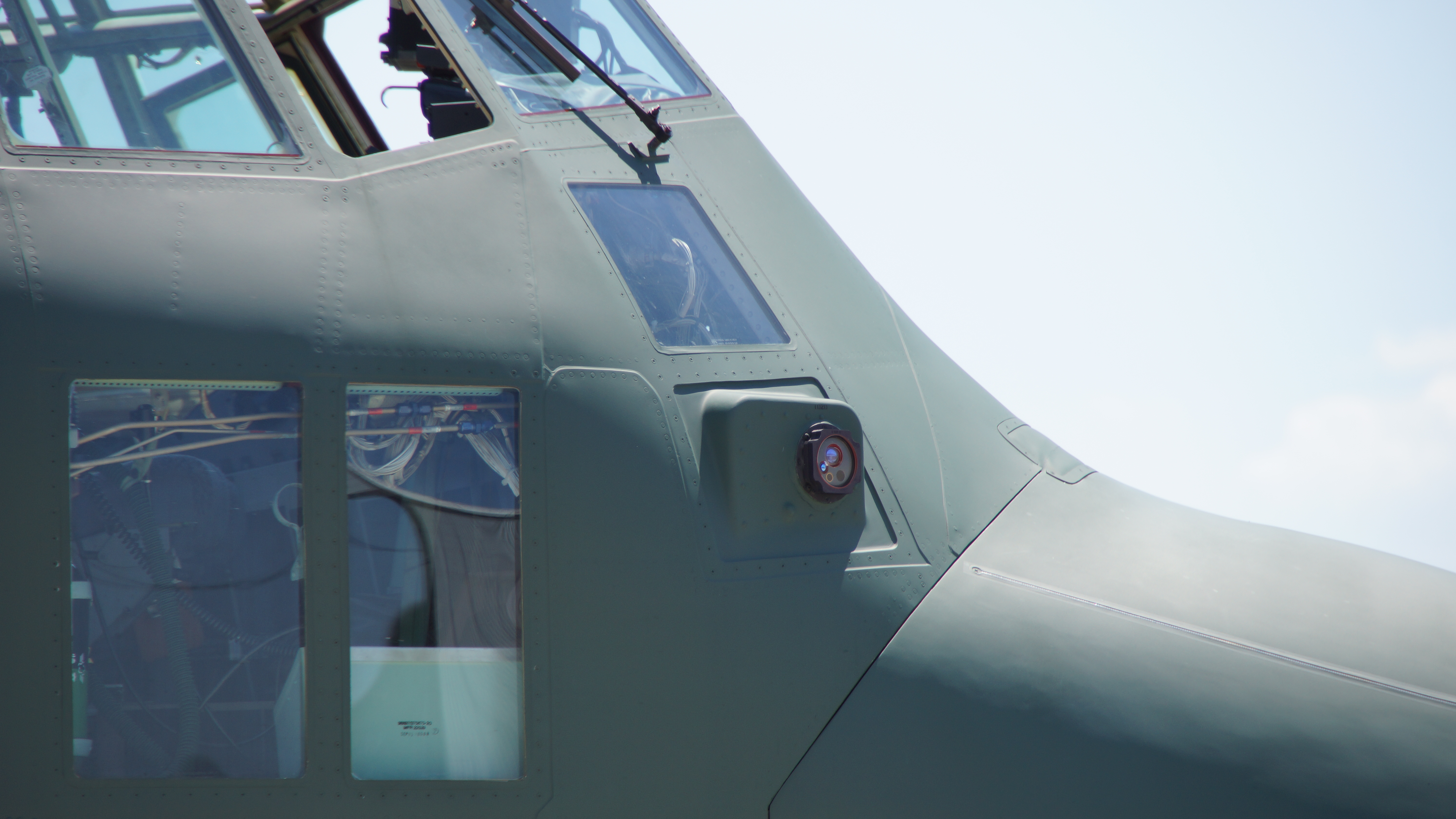
- AN/AAR-47 sensor on C-130H Hercules aircraft
- Status: In use

Manufacturing Info
- Designer(s): Loral Corp
- Manufacturer(s): Loral Corp; Honeywell; Alliant Techsystems; now Northrop Grumman
- Introduced: 1983
- No. produced: >6,600

Specifications
- Length: 2.2 m (7.2 ft)
- Diameter: 40.6 cm (16.0 in)
- Weight: 208 kg (459 lb)

Usage
- Used by country: See Users
- Used by military: See Users
- Variants: AN/AAR-47(V)1; AN/AAR-47(V)2; AN/AAR-47A(V)2; AN/AAR-47B(V)2

The AN/AAR-47 Missile Approach Warning System is a Missile Approach Warning system used on slow moving aircraft such as helicopters and military transport aircraft to notify the pilot of threats and to trigger the aircraft's countermeasures systems. Its primary users are the U.S. Army, U.S. Marine Corps, U.S. Navy and U.S. Air Force, although it is also operated by other countries. The MAWS was originally developed by Loral Corporation (now part of BAE Systems). Later, 100 to 300 sets per annum were dual-source procured from Loral Infrared & Imaging Systems (LIRIS) and Honeywell Electro-Optics Div., both in Lexington, MA. Since 1998, it has also been a product of Alliant Techsystems (now Northrop Grumman).

In accordance with the Joint Electronics Type Designation System (JETDS), the "AN/AAR-47" designation represents the 47th design of an Army-Navy airborne electronic device for infrared detection equipment. The JETDS system also now is used to name all Department of Defense electronic systems.

== Operation ==
The AN/AAR-47 passively detects missiles by their infrared signature, and uses algorithms to differentiate between incoming missiles and false alarms. Newer versions also have laser warning sensors and are capable of detecting a wider range of threats. After processing the nature of the threat, the system gives the pilot an audio and visual warning, and indicates the direction of the incoming threat. It also sends a signal to the aircraft's infrared countermeasures system, which can then for example deploy flares.

The system's algorithms include looking for temporal variations in a signal's strength, such as the brightening of an incoming missile. It also evaluates the spectral bandpass of the threat to reduce false alarms and has software for detecting events, such as the launch of a surface-to-air missile.

== History ==
The AN/AAR-47 is a line of missile warning systems by Loral and ATK Alliant Techsystems. The development of the original AN/AAR-47(V)1 began in 1983 by Loral. ATK became a second production source in the mid 90s and eventually became the prime contractor. In 1998 ATK began production of the improved AN/AAR-47(V)2 version, which added laser warning functionality. As of 2005, over 5000 of these sets have been manufactured. In 2006, production of the AN/AAR-47A(V)2 began, also developed by ATK. It has further improved missile and laser warning capabilities.

A further developed model, AAR-47B(V)2, reached initial operating capability in 2008. It adds Hostile Fire Indication (HFI), which is the ability to detect incoming rocket-propelled grenades and tracer ammunition in addition to an overall improvement in missile detection. The U.S. Navy placed orders for over 1600 in 2009.

== Components ==
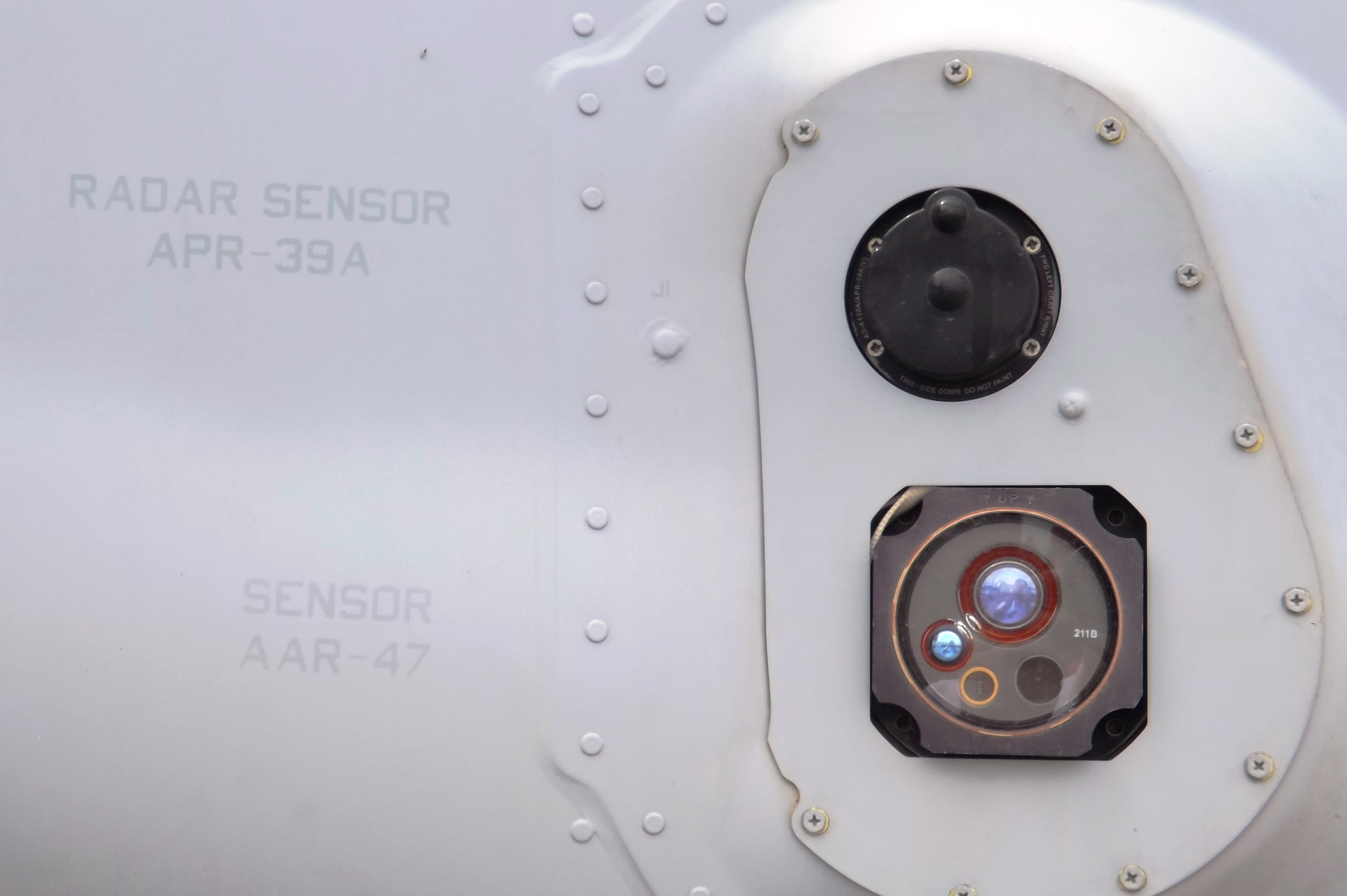
AAR-47 Sensors mounted on a USMC V-22 Osprey aircraft

The AAR-47 missile warning system consists of 4 Optical Sensor Converters (OSC), a Computer Processor and a Control Indicator. The system is relatively light at a total weight of approximately 32 pounds.

There is one optical sensor converter for each side of the aircraft. They have an infrared camera for detecting incoming missiles. The Optical modules since version AAR-47(V)2 include a laser warning sensor, and versions since AAR-47A(V)2 further incorporate an ultraviolet sensor for improved dynamic blanking laser warning detection.

The computer processor evaluates the data from the OSC:s and analyzes whether a detected event is an incoming missile. If a threat is detected, it sends a signal to the control indicator which informs the crew, and the aircraft's infrared countermeasures system.

== Variants ==
- AN/AAR-47(V)1: Original version providing missile warning with IR detectors.
- AN/AAR-47(V)2: Adds laser warning sensors to the optical sensor modules and extends temperature operation range and operational life.
- AN/AAR-47A(V)2: Adds UV detectors, increases detection sensitivity and extends temperature operation range and operational life.
- AN/AAR-47B(V)2: Has improved detection performance, clutter detection, and is capable of detecting RPGs and incoming fire using tracer ammunition. The OSC:s are identical to 47A(V)2.

== Users ==
Sources:

- Austria
- Canada
- Germany
- India
- Israel
- Portugal
- Taiwan
- United Kingdom
- United States
  - United States Air Force
  - United States Army
  - United States Navy
  - United States Marine Corps
  - United States National Guard

== See also ==
- List of military electronics of the United States
