= Alliant Techsystems =

American aerospace and defense firm (1990–2015)

Alliant Techsystems Inc.
- Company type: Public
- Traded as: NYSE: ATK
- Industry: Aerospace, arms
- Founded: 1990, spun off from Honeywell
- Defunct: February 9, 2015
- Fate: Merged with Orbital Sciences Corporation to form Orbital ATK, sporting group spun off as Vista Outdoor
- Headquarters: Arlington, Virginia, United States
- Key people: Mark DeYoung (President & CEO)
- Revenue: ▲US$4.8 billion (2017)
- Net income: ▲US$0.3 billion (2017)
- Total assets: ▲US$5.8 billion (2017)
- Total equity: ▲US$1.9 billion (2017)
- Number of employees: 16,000 (2017)
- Website: atk.com
- Footnotes / references Financials as of March 31, 2014 (final fiscal year end)

Alliant Techsystems Inc. (ATK) was an American aerospace and arms manufacturer headquartered in Arlington County, Virginia. The company operated across 22 states, Puerto Rico, and internationally. ATK revenue in fiscal year 2014 was about US$4.8 billion.

On April 29, 2014, ATK announced that it would spin off its Sporting Group and merge its Aerospace and Defense Groups with Orbital Sciences Corporation.

The spinoff of the Sporting Group to create Vista Outdoor and the merger leading to the creation of Orbital ATK were completed on February 9, 2015. The companies began operations as separate entities on February 20, 2015. Orbital ATK was bought by Northrop Grumman in 2018.

== History ==
ATK was launched as an independent company in 1990 after Honeywell spun off its defense businesses to shareholders. The former Honeywell businesses had supplied defense products and systems to the U.S. and its allies for 50 years, including the first electronic autopilot for the B-17 aircraft's bombing missions during World War II.

In 1995, ATK entered the aerospace market with the acquisition of the Hercules Aerospace Co., a division of Hercules Inc. Since then ATK has become a supplier of aerospace and defense products to the U.S. government and its allies, and to their contractors. It also carries on the manufacture and sale of the Hercules gunpowder lines.

In 2001, ATK acquired Thiokol, renaming it ATK Launch Systems in 2006, though it was still known within the industry by its original name. Thiokol was the sole manufacturer of the reusable Solid Rocket Motor used to launch the NASA Space Shuttle, which is being adapted for NASA's Space Launch System.

Also in 2001, ATK entered the sporting and law enforcement ammunition market with the acquisition of the ammunition businesses of Blount International. This acquisition made ATK the nation's largest manufacturer of ammunition.

In 2009, ATK acquired Eagle Industries and in 2010 ATK acquired Blackhawk Industries Products Group Unlimited, LLC, diversifying into the security and law enforcement market.

On April 29, 2014, ATK announced that its board unanimously approved a plan to create two independent, public companies composed of ATK's current businesses and Orbital Sciences Corporation. ATK spun off its Sporting Group to ATK shareholders on a tax-free basis. The spinoff was immediately followed by an all-stock merger of ATK's Aerospace and Defense Groups with Orbital Sciences; Orbital shareholders received ATK common stock as consideration. The combined company was named Orbital ATK Inc. On October 28, 2014, ATK announced that it would be seeking approval of issuance of shares to Orbital stockholders on December 9.

ATK responded to news of the explosion of a rocket built by Orbital in an earnings call. ATK stated it would conduct a "thorough evaluation of any potential implications resulting from the incident, including current operating plans, long-term strategies, and the proposed transaction". ATK also said that it was taking a careful look at its Castor 30XL motor, which is used in the second stage of Orbital's Antares rocket. ATK further noted that the explosion occurred before ignition of the second stage.

On November 17, 2014, ATK stated that its due-diligence assessment of its merger with Orbital Sciences undertaken in response to the failure of Orbital's Antares rocket found that the transaction remained in the best interest of its shareholders. Both firms rescheduled shareholder votes on the merger from December 9, 2014, to January 27, 2015.

The spinoff of the Sporting Group to create Vista Outdoor and the merger leading to the creation of Orbital ATK were completed on February 9, 2015; both companies began operations as separate entities on February 20, 2015. Orbital ATK was bought by Northrop Grumman in June 2018. In July 2022, Northrop Grumman CEO Kathy Warden denied reports that the Federal Trade Commission (FTC) would break up the merger.

== Groups ==
=== ATK Aerospace ===
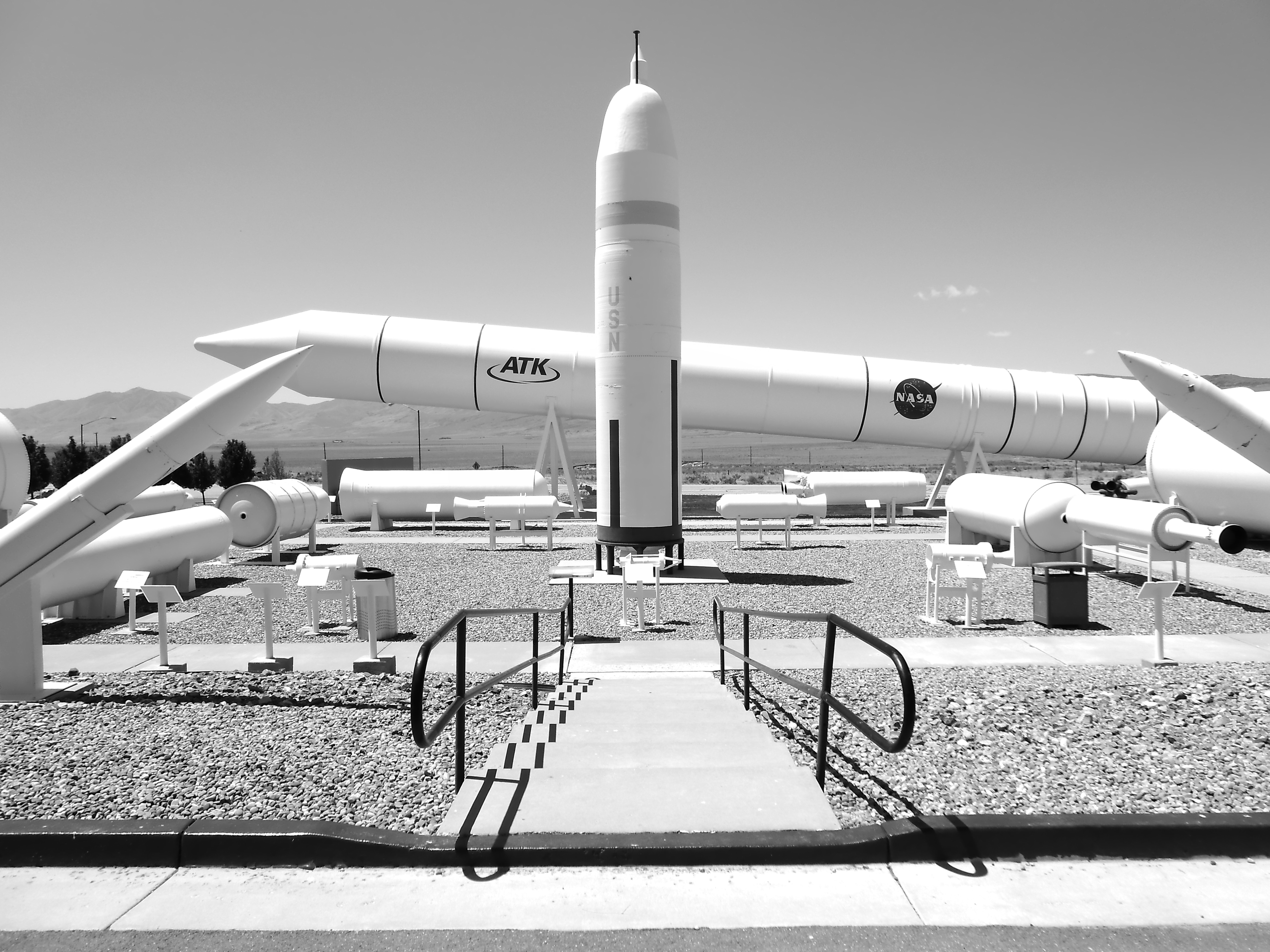
A display of ATK rockets

ATK's Aerospace Group covered space, defense and commercial aerospace products and capabilities. The group offered propulsion for space exploration, commercial launch vehicles and strategic and missile defense. ATK Aerospace was headquartered in Magna, Utah.

It also specialized in:

- Composite structures for military and commercial aircraft
- Rolls-Royce Trent XWB-97 engine
- Lockheed Martin F-35 Lightning II (also known as the Joint Strike Fighter)
- Integrated satellite systems
- Satellite components and subsystems
- Military flares and decoys
- Space engineering services
- Propulsion for space exploration, commercial launch vehicles, strategic and missile defines
  - ALV X-1 sounding rocket

In November 2010, ATK was selected by NASA for potential contracts in heavy lift launch vehicle systems and other propulsion technologies. In 2012, NASA awarded the company a $50 million contract to complete engineering development and risk reduction tests as part of the Advanced Concept Booster Development for the Space Launch System (SLS).

In April 2014, ATK received a contract from the United Launch Alliance, worth $178 million, to produce composite structures for the United States Air Force's Evolved Expendable Launch Vehicle program. ATK will deliver parts for the Atlas V and Delta IV starting in 2014 and continuing into early 2018. There is an option for additional deliveries in 2017 and 2018. ATK will provide fairings, payload adapters and diaphragms, interstages, nose cones, and thermal/aerodynamic protection components. All the structures will be produced at ATK's Large Structures Center of Excellence in Iuka, Mississippi.

ATK produces avionics for NASA's Space Launch System program. The Space Launch System is designed for deep space operations, including missions to Mars. After ATK finishes testing, avionics will be delivered to NASA's Marshall Space Flight Center. The first launch is expected in 2017.

==== Airbus A350 XWB-1000 ====
ATK produces composite stringers and frames for the Airbus A350 XWB-1000 variant at its facility in Clearfield, Utah. As of 2014, ATK has delivered more than 10,000 components to Airbus.

==== Boeing 787 Dreamliner ====
ATK participated in a consortium to develop a new engine nozzle for the Boeing 787 designed to make its operation more environmentally friendly. The nozzle was made from oxide-oxide ceramic matrix composite (CMC) and tested on the 787 ecoDemonstrator. Boeing's tests show that the nozzle is more heat resistant than previous models and lighter, allowing for potential gains in fuel efficiency. This was the largest part ever made from CMC.

==== Orion Multi-Purpose Crew Vehicle ====
The Orion Multi-Purpose Crew Vehicle is a spacecraft intended to carry a crew of up to four astronauts to destinations beyond-low Earth orbit. Currently under development by NASA, for launch on the Space Launch System, Orion will facilitate human exploration of the Moon, asteroids and Mars.

ATK developed the launch abort motor that sits on top of the Orion capsule. This device would pull the capsule and its crew up and away from the rocket in the event of major fault on the launch pad or during ascent. ATK also developed numerous composite parts that provide heat protection for Orion.

==== James Webb Space Telescope ====
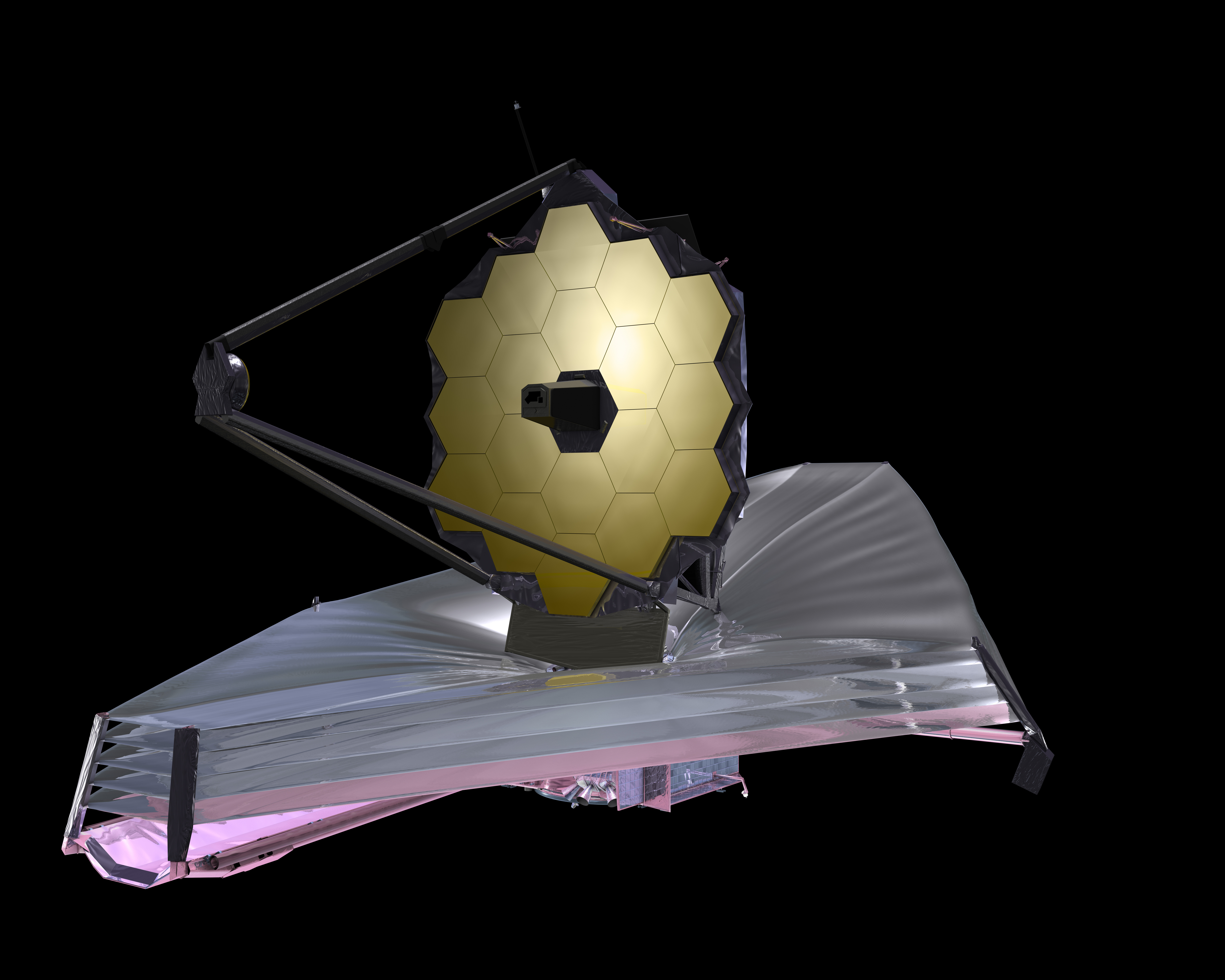
3/4 view of JWST from the "top" (opposite side from the Sun)

ATK worked with Northrop Grumman to produce the backplane support frame (BSF) for the James Webb Space Telescope. The BSF, center section, and wings form what is called the primary mirror backplane support system (PMBSS). The BSF is the primary load-bearing structure during launch and the PMBSS holds the telescope's main instruments, including its mirrors. The BSF was designed and manufactured at ATK's facilities in Magna, Utah. ATK designed and fabricated more than 10,000 parts for the PMBSS. PMBSS is made primarily of lightweight graphite, but numerous other materials including invar, titanium, and other composite materials were used.

==== Delta II ====
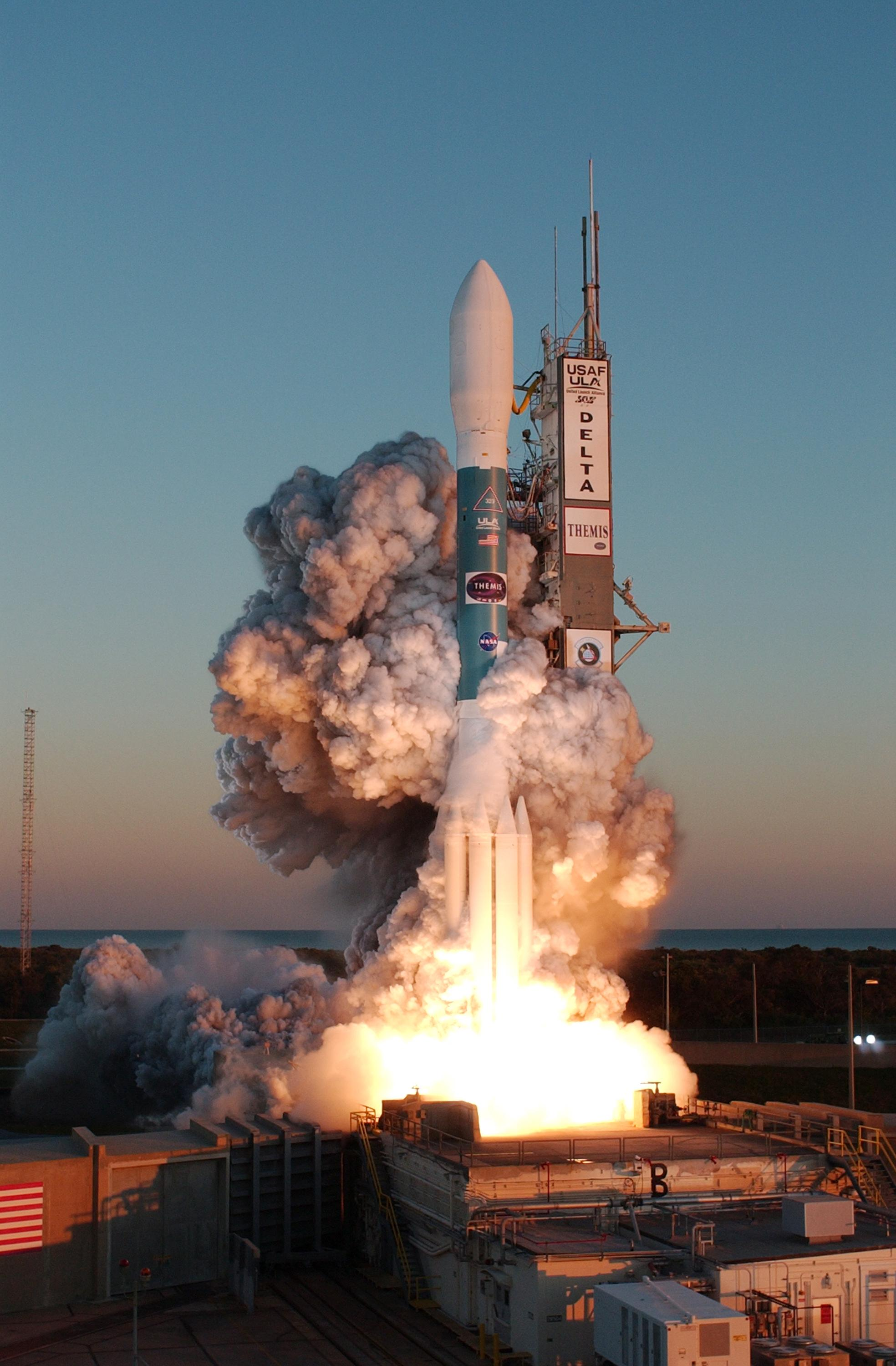
Clouds of smoke around the 323rd Delta rocket on launch pad 17B

ATK produces Graphite Epoxy Motors (GEM) and largest composite fairings for the Delta II rocket as a subcontractor for the United Launch Alliance. As of June 2014, ATK has produced 987 solid rocket boosters for Delta II missions. These strap-on boosters, known as GEM-40s, add 434,000 pounds to the Delta II's maximum thrust. The GEM-40s can be used in groups of three, four, and nine depending on the weight of the payload. The composite structures supplied by ATK increase performance by reducing weight. In addition to composite booster cases for the GEM-40s, ATK produces a 10-foot wide composite payload fairing that covers and protects satellites during launch. ATK also produces the titanium diaphragm propellant tanks and pressurant tank for each Delta II vehicle.

==== Delta IV ====
ATK produces Graphite Epoxy Motors and numerous other components for the Delta IV rocket. For example, for the Delta IV that carried the Wideband Global SATCOM satellite (WGS-6) into orbit for the U.S. Air Force, ATK supplied the interstage connector that linked the Common Booster Core and the cryogenic second stage, a centerbody that connects the liquid oxygen tank to liquid hydrogen tanks, a thermal shield for the RS-68 engine, the composite payload fairing, and numerous pieces of hardware for securing the payload.

==== Orbiting Carbon Observatory 2 ====
The Orbiting Carbon Observatory 2 (OCO-2) is an American environmental science satellite. The spacecraft is used to study carbon dioxide concentrations and distributions in the atmosphere. ATK produced the OCO-2's Variable Conductance Heat Pipes, an important part of its thermal control system, solar arrays, and solar array substrates.

==== InSight ====
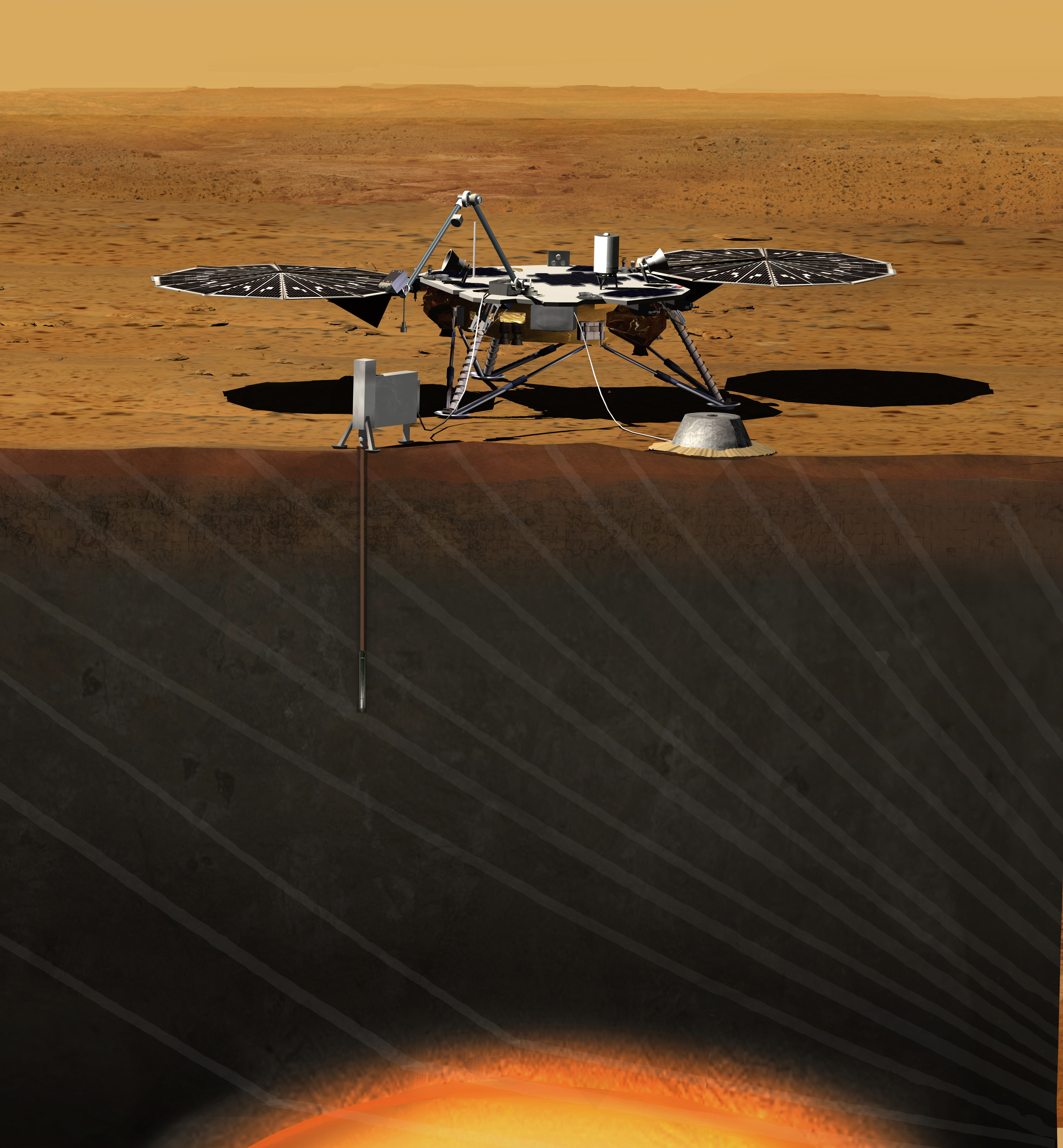
InSight Lander

InSight is a robotic lander mission to Mars originally planned for launch in March 2016. The mission's objective is to place a stationary lander equipped with a seismometer and heat flow probe on the surface of Mars to study its early geological evolution. This would bring new understanding of the solar system's terrestrial planets. ATK was awarded a contract to provide its UltraFlex solar arrays for the mission. ATK claims that UltraFlex will provide better performance than typical solar arrays used on spacecraft while accommodating ambitious requirements for low mass and small size.

==== Atlas V ====
ATK entered the competition to replace the Russian-made rocket engine on the Atlas V rocket in September 2014. The Atlas V is used to launch most U.S. military satellites. ATK entered the competition in response to a request for proposals from the Air Force Space and Missile Defense Center issued in 2013 for the RD-180 rocket engine. ATK already supplies rocket engines used in heavier version of the Atlas V. ATK says that solid rocket motors are more reliable and deliver more thrust. ATK said, "Solid rocket motors are optimal for first-stage performance as they provide high lift-off thrust, allowing for more payload margin. They also require less ground and launch infrastructure, resulting in fewer launch scrubs." The RD-180 engines use kerosene for fuel. The request from the Air Force occurred due to concerns about whether the RD-180 would be available in the future due to increasing tensions with Russia.

==== Graphite Epoxy Motors ====
The Graphite-Epoxy Motor (GEM) is a solid rocket motor produced by ATK using epoxy composite casing. GEMs are used as boosters for the Delta II, Delta III, and Delta IV launch vehicles. The use of composite materials allows for booster casings several times lighter than the steel casings of the Castor 4 solid rocket motors they replaced. The first flight of a GEM occurred in 1990 on a Delta II 7925.

=== ATK Defense ===
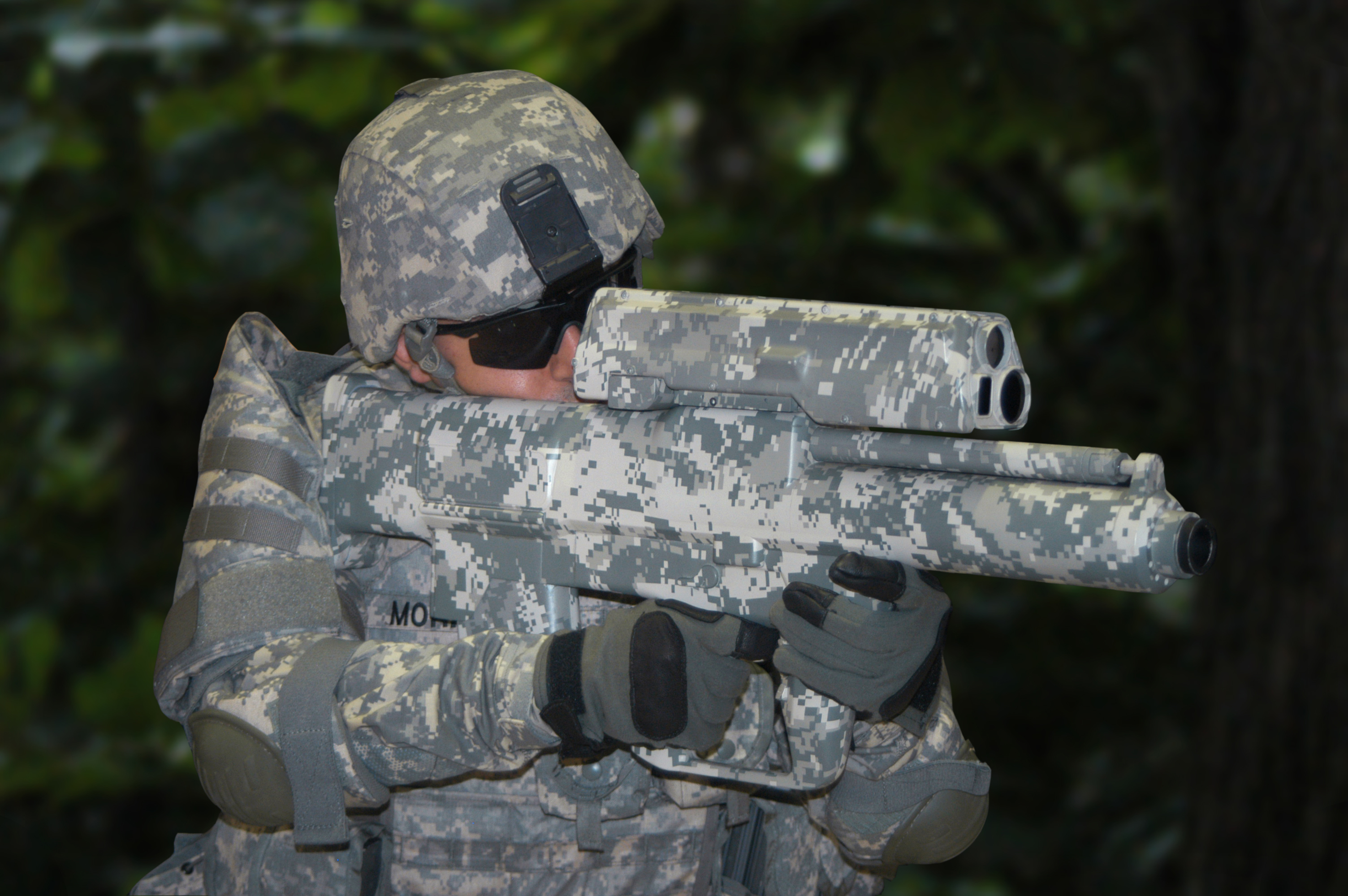
XM-25 Counter Defilade Target Engagement System

ATK's Defense Group produced ammunition, precision and strike weapons, missile-warning solutions and tactical rocket motors across air, sea and land-based systems.

ATK Defense Group develops products and services for:

- Small-, medium- and large-caliber ammunition
- Anti-radiation homing strike vehicles
  - AARGM
- Missile warning and hostile fire detection
- Precision-guided munitions
  - PGK
  - XM25
- Propulsion, advanced fuzing and warheads
- Medium-caliber gun systems
- Missile defense interceptors
- Weaponized ISR special mission aircraft
  - MC-27J

As of April 2014, ATK had a three-year contract with Lockheed to develop a warhead for the Guided Multiple Launch Rocket System. The contract includes engineering, manufacturing, and development. ATK's work will focus on system performance, warhead qualification, and producibility.

==== Lake City Army Ammunition Plant ====
In 2012, ATK was selected by the United States Army to continue operating and maintaining the Lake City Army Ammunition Plant (LCAAP) for an additional seven to ten years. The LCAAP is a federally owned facility in Independence, Missouri. It was built by Remington Arms in 1941 to manufacture and test small-caliber ammunition for the army. As of July 2007, the plant produced about 1.5 billion rounds of ammunition per year. The LCAAP still tests ammunition and is the largest producer of small-arms ammunition for the U.S. military. ATK has operated the LCAAP since April 2001.

The United States Army and ATK opened a renovated ammunition production facility at the LCAAP in December 2014. The renovations improved efficiency and quality control. The Army and ATK invested $11 million to modernize "Building 65" for the production of 20 millimeter ammunition. These large caliber rounds are usually fired from automatic cannons mounted on ground vehicles and aircraft. Building 65 housed 20 millimeter round production until 1997, when it was moved to Building 3. About 50 people are employed on this line.

==== AGM-88E Advanced Anti-Radiation Guided Missile ====
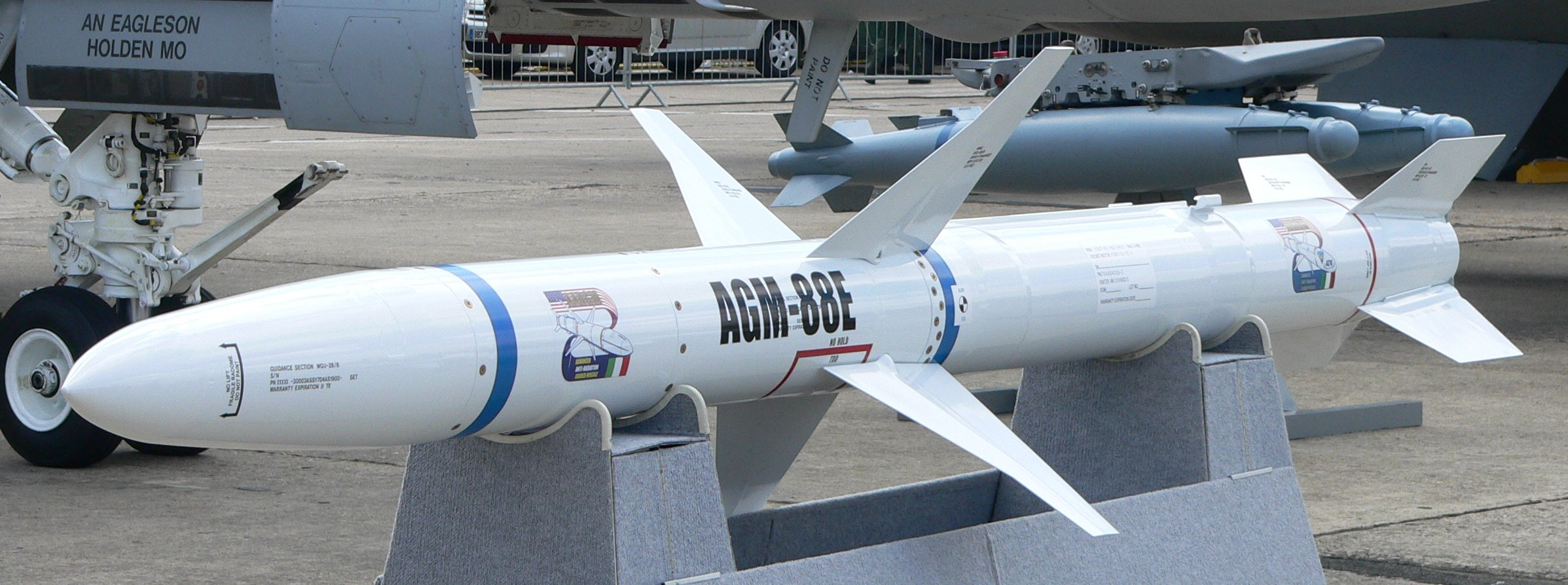
AGM-88E

The AGM-88E Advanced Anti-Radiation Guided Missile (AARGM) is an upgrade to the AGM-88 High-speed Anti-Radiation Missile (HARM). The AARGM is the result of cooperation between the United States and Italy. It is produced by ATK. In September 2013, ATK delivered the 100th AARGM to the U.S. Navy. It will be initially integrated onto the FA-18C/D, FA-18E/F, EA-18G, and Tornado ECR aircraft and later on the F-35. The AGM-88E development program was proceeded on schedule and did not exceed its budget.

In August 2014, the United States Navy awarded a full-rate production contract to ATK to produce to AARGM. Under this contract ATK will also provide captive air training missiles for both the United States and Italy. This is the third contract for the AARGM won by ATK and it is worth $96.2 million.

==== AN/AAR-47 Missile Approach Warning System ====
The AN/AAR-47 Missile Approach Warning System (MWS) is used on slow moving aircraft such as helicopters and military transport aircraft to notify the pilot of threats and to trigger the aircraft's countermeasures systems. Its main users are the U.S. Army, Navy and Air Force, but is also operated by other countries. Originally developed by Loral Space & Communications, it has been solely a product of ATK since 2002. The AN/AAR-47 passively detects missiles by their infrared signature, and uses algorithms to differentiate between incoming missiles and false alarms. Newer versions also have laser warning sensors and are capable of detecting a wider range of threats. After processing the nature of the threat, the system gives the pilot an audio and visual warning, and tells the direction of the incoming threat. It also sends a signal to the aircraft's infrared countermeasures system, which can then for example deploy flares. The development of the original AN/AAR-47(V)1 began in 1983 by Loral. ATK became a second production source in the mid 90s and eventually became the primary contractor. In 1998 ATK began production of the improved AN/AAR-47(V)2, which added laser warning functionality.

==== Precision Guidance Kit ====
The Precision Guidance Kit (PGK) is a United States Army program to develop a precision guidance system for existing 155 mm artillery shells. The prime contractor is Alliant Techsystems and the project team includes Interstate Electronics Corporation. In operation the PGK will screw into the nose of the projectile much like the existing fuze. However, as well as the fuzing function it will provide a GPS guidance package and control surfaces to correct the flight of the shell. This is analogous to the addition of a Joint Direct Attack Munition (JDAM) tail-kit to a dumb iron bomb, creating a precision guided munition. Production started in 2009.

==== Bushmaster autocannons ====
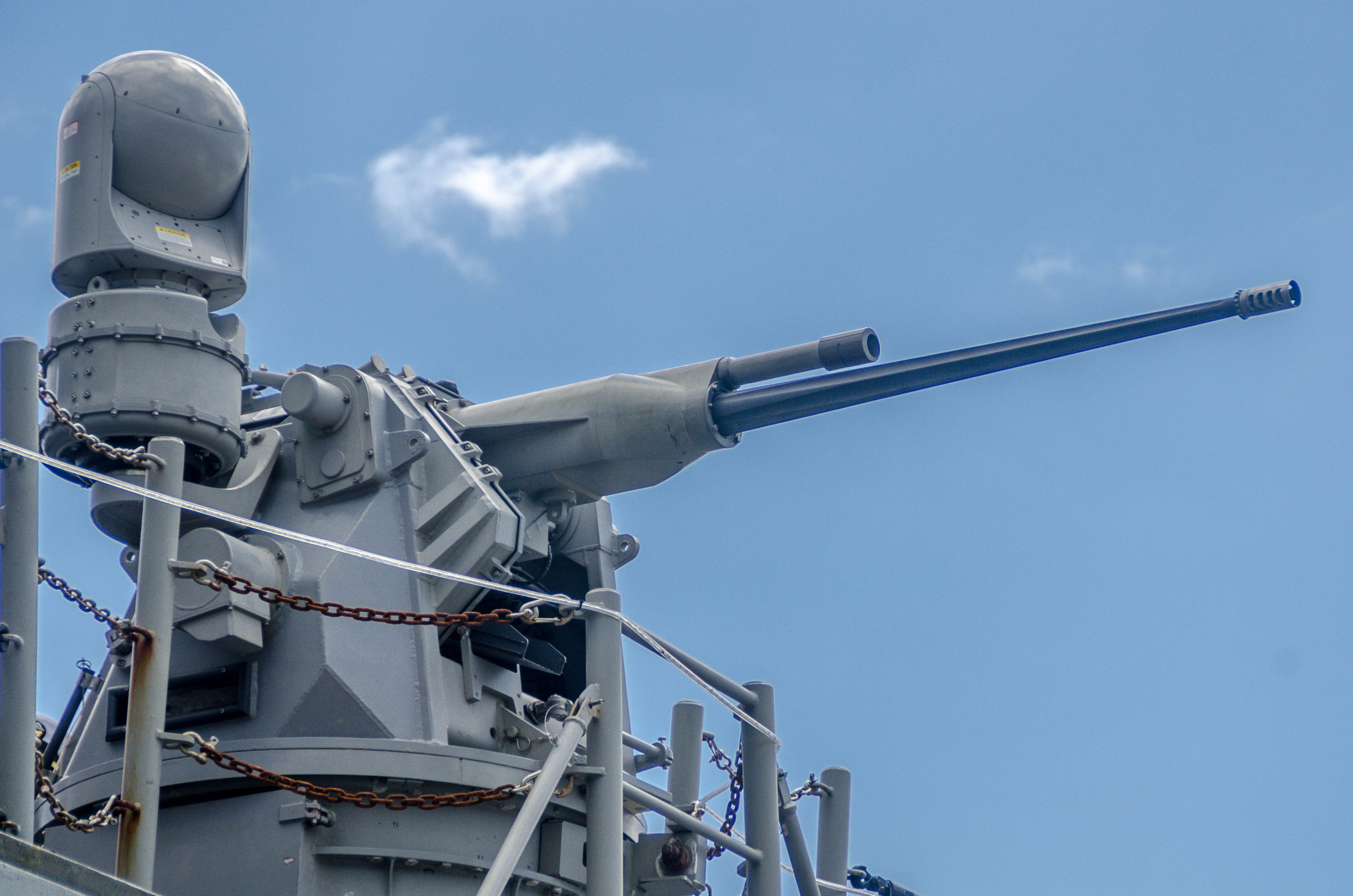
USS Chosin (CG-65) cruiser's 25mm M242 Bushmaster autocannon

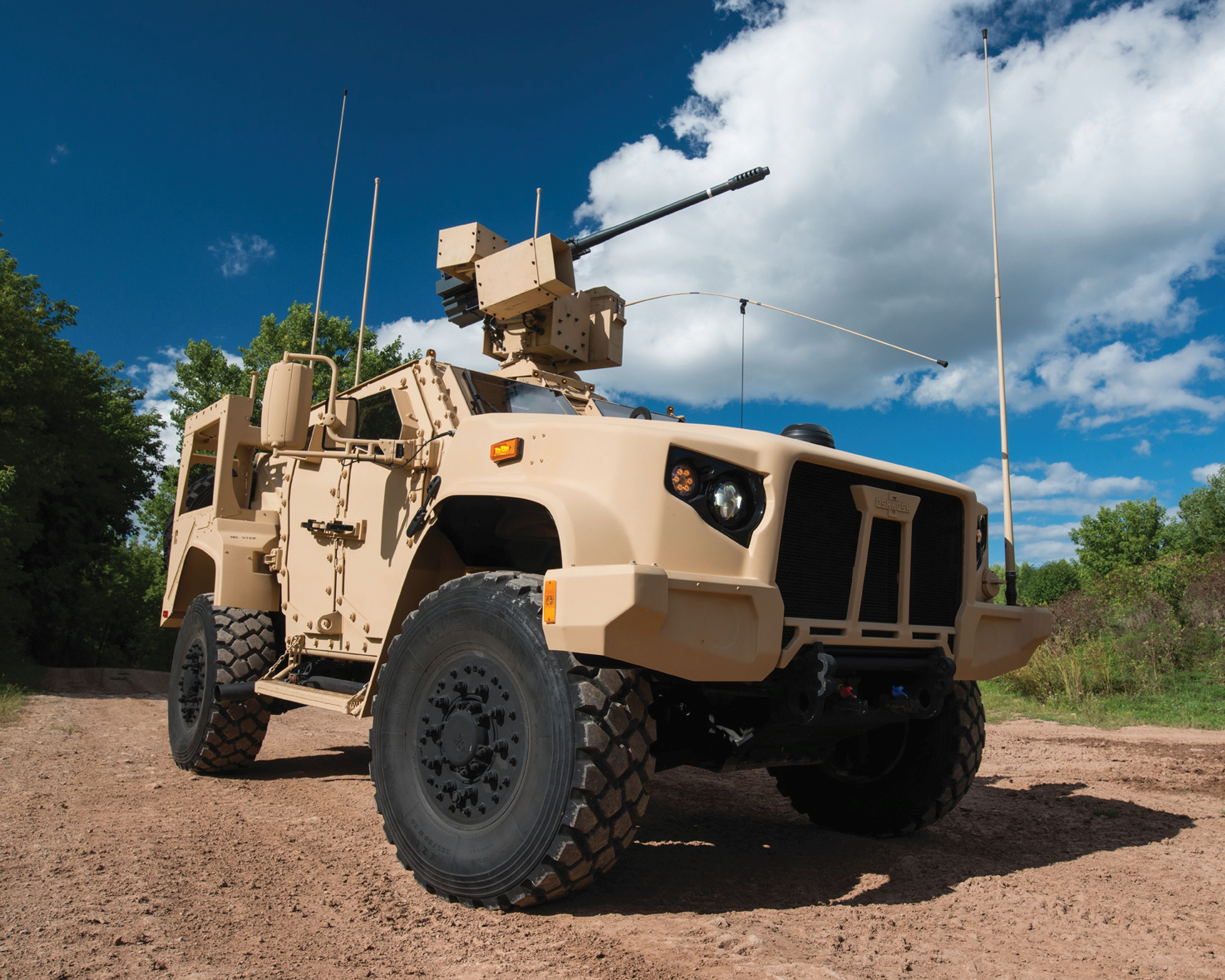
2016: Oshkosh L-ATV (configured as JLTV) with EOS R-400S-MK2 remote weapon system armed with Orbital ATK's M230-LF 30mm lightweight automatic chain gun.

The M242 Bushmaster is a 25 mm (25×137mm) chain-fed autocannon. It is used extensively by the United States and NATO forces in ground combat vehicles and watercraft. Originally, the weapon was designed and manufactured by McDonnell Douglas. It is an externally powered, chain driven, single-barrel weapon which may be fired in semi-automatic, burst, or automatic modes. It is fed by a metallic link belt and has dual-feed capability. The term "chain gun" derives from the use of a roller chain that drives the bolt back and forth. The gun can destroy lightly armored vehicles and aerial targets, such as helicopters and slow-flying aircraft. It can also suppress enemy positions such as exposed troops, dug-in positions, and occupied built-up areas. The standard rate of fire is 200 rounds per minute. The weapon has an effective range of 3,000 metres (9,800 ft), depending on the type of ammunition used.

The Mk44 Bushmaster II is a 30 mm chain gun also manufactured by ATK. It is a derivative of the 25 mm M242 referenced above and uses 70% of the same parts as the M242. The Mk 44 Bushmaster II is the standard primary armament of the Bionix-II AFV currently in service with the Singapore Army, the KTO Rosomak in Polish service as well as that of the CV90 AFVs in Finnish, Norwegian and Swiss service. Some United States Navy vessels, such as the new San Antonio-class amphibious transport dock are armed with the Bushmaster II for surface threat defense.

The XM813 Bushmaster, also produced by ATK Defense, is based on the Mk44 and is offered as an upgrade for M1126 Stryker and M2 Bradley. Improvements include a one-inch longer barrel, integral mount to increase first round hit probability by up to 10 percent, and dual recoil system to enhance accuracy and cope with future hotter propellants. It can have a next-round select, linkless feed system. The 30 mm chain gun can fire Mk310 Programmable Air Burst Munition rounds to attack targets in defilade. The United States Army Research, Development and Engineering Command helped enhance the XM813 mainly for safety and turret integration. By changing five parts, the gun caliber can be increased to 40 mm. As of November 2013, the XM813 was being tested at Aberdeen Proving Ground.

=== ATK Sporting ===
ATK's Sporting Group offered products under several brands for sport-shooting enthusiasts, police, and military customers around the world. In 2015, this group was spun off to form the independent company, Vista Outdoor Inc. Vista Outdoor is publicly traded and headquartered in Utah. The group provided:

- Traditional center fire and rim fire rifles, and shotguns
- Ammunition for sport shooting, law enforcement, military, and security
- Hunting, shooting sports, and outdoor recreation accessories
- Optics, gun cleaning, targets and range systems
- Tactical accessories for military, law enforcement and security markets
- Gunpowder for ammunition and re-loaders

ATK's outdoor products brands included: Federal Premium Ammunition, Bushnell, Savage Arms, BLACKHAWK!, Primos, Final Approach, Uncle Mike's, Hoppe's, RCBS, Alliant Powder, CCI, Speer, Champion Targets, Gold Tip Arrows, Weaver Optics, Outers, Bolle, Cebe, and Serengeti. As of 2013, ATK's sporting business accounted for nearly 45 percent of the company's revenue.

== See also ==
- List of modern armament manufacturers
- Top 100 Contractors of the U.S. federal government
- Armor-piercing shell
- M150 Penetration Augmented Munition
