= M150 Penetration Augmented Munition =

US Army explosive device

The M150 Penetration Augmented Munition (PAM) is an explosive device developed for the Special Operations Forces of the United States Army, such as Delta Force. It is designed to destroy large, reinforced concrete structures, such as bridges, and was developed by Alliant Techsystems in collaboration with the Lawrence Livermore National Laboratory.

== History and function ==
The PAM originated in a project run by the Livermore laboratory for the United States Air Force. In the 1980s, they were tasked with developing a two-stage explosive device: this resulted in a 2,000 lb bomb, and funding from DARPA to develop a three-stage device designed to blow craters in runways. That three-stage device drew the attention of both the Department of Energy and Department of Defense, who signed a Memorandum of Understanding directing the development of a man-portable munition. This resulted in the PAM.

Each PAM consists of four primary components: a Tandem Forward Charge (TFC), a Follow Through Charge (FTC), a propulsion system, and an electronic fusing system. The PAM is placed against the structure and fires an explosive bolt, pinning the PAM in place. It then fires the TFC, which consists of two explosive devices: one, the forward charge, that cuts rebar, and the other, the hole-drilling charge, that drills a hole in the target. The FTC is then accelerated by the propulsion system into the newly drilled hole, where it detonates, removing up to 75% of the target's ability to bear loads.

The PAM weighs 35 lbs, and can be used by a single operator; an equivalent device made from a conventional explosive, such as C-4, would weigh 200 lbs and need seven people to operate it.

== See also ==
- Alliant Techsystems
- High explosive squash head
- Lawrence Livermore National Laboratory
- Shaped charge
