= List of military rockets =

This is a list of unguided rockets and missiles used for military purposes.

== List ==
List of Military Rockets
Name	Type	Country of Origin
AIR-2 Genie	Air-to-air rocket	USA
Gimlet	Air-to-air rocket	USA
Le Prieur	Air-to-air rocket	France
Arash	Tactical rocket	Iran
T-122 Sakarya	Tactical rocket	Turkey
Bora	Tactical rocket	Turkey
Kasirga rocket system	Tactical rocket	Turkey
TOROS artillery rocket system	Tactical rocket	Turkey
Mk 4/Mk 40 folding-fin aerial rocket	Air-to-air rocket	USA
R4M rocket	Air-to-air rocket	Germany
RS-82 rocket	Air-to-air rocket	Soviet Union
Werfer-Granate 21	Air-to-air rocket	Germany
3.5-inch forward firing aircraft rocket	Air-to-surface rocket	USA
5-inch forward firing aircraft rocket	Air-to-surface rocket	USA
8 cm Flz.-Rakete Oerlikon	Air-to-surface rocket	Switzerland
BOAR	Air-to-surface rocket	USA
Naze'at 6-H	Tactical rocket	Iran
Naze'at 10-H	Tactical rocket	Iran
CRV7	Air-to-surface rocket	Canada
High-Velocity Aircraft Rocket (HVAR)	Air-to-surface rocket	USA
Hydra 70	Air-to-surface rocket	USA
Zuni 127	Air-to-surface rocket	USA
Mk 4/Mk 40 folding-fin aerial rocket	Air-to-surface rocket	USA
Ram	Air-to-surface rocket	USA
Red Angel	Air-to-surface rocket	United Kingdom
RP-3	Air-to-surface rocket	United Kingdom
RS-82	Air-to-surface rocket	Soviet Union
RS-132	Air-to-surface rocket	Soviet Union
S-5 (ARS-57)	Air-to-surface rocket	Soviet Union
Shahin	Tactical rocket	Iran
Fajr-4	Air-to-surface rocket	Iran
Badr-1	Tactical rocket	Yemen
S-8	Air-to-surface rocket	Soviet Union
S-13	Air-to-surface rocket	Soviet Union
S-24	Air-to-surface rocket	Soviet Union
S-25	Air-to-surface rocket	Soviet Union
Yarmuk	Tactical rocket	Pakistan
SNEB	Air-to-surface rocket	France
Sakr-18	Tactical rocket	Egypt
Sakr-36	Tactical rocket	Egypt
Sakr-45	Tactical rocket	Egypt
Jobaria Defense Systems Multiple Cradle Launcher	Tactical rocket	United Arab Emirates
Falaq-1	Tactical rocket	Iran
Falaq-2	Tactical rocket	Iran
SNORA	Air-to-surface rocket	Switzerland
SURA	Air-to-surface rocket	Switzerland
Tiny Tim	Air-to-surface rocket	USA
Oghab	Tactical rocket	Iran
Alcotán-100	Anti-tank rocket	Spain
APILAS	Anti-tank rocket	France
AT4	Anti-tank rocket	Sweden
AT-4 Spigot	Anti-tank rocket	Soviet Union
B-300	Anti-tank rocket	Israel
Bazooka	Anti-tank rocket	USA
C90-CR (M3)	Anti-tank rocket	Spain
Folgore	Anti-tank rocket	Italy
FT-5	Anti-tank rocket	South Africa
Heller	Anti-tank rocket	Canada
Hungarian 44M	Anti-tank rocket	Hungary
LRAC F1	Anti-tank rocket	France
M72 LAW	Anti-tank rocket	USA
M79 Osa	Anti-tank rocket	Yugoslavia
M80 Zolja	Anti-tank rocket	SFR Yugoslavia
M90 Strsljen	Anti-tank rocket	Serbia
MARA	Anti-tank rocket	Argentina
PF-89	Anti-tank rocket	China
Panzerschreck (Raketenpanzerbüchse)	Anti-tank rocket	Germany
Panzerfaust 3	Anti-tank rocket	Germany
PG-7VR	Anti-tank rocket	Soviet Union
RL-83 Blindicide	Anti-tank rocket	Belgium
Zelzal-1	Tactical rocket	Iran
Zelzal-2	Tactical rocket	Iran
Zelzal-3	Tactical rocket	Iran
RPG-7	Anti-tank rocket	Soviet Union
RPG-16	Anti-tank rocket	Soviet Union
RPG-18 "Muha"	Anti-tank rocket	Soviet Union
RPG-22 "Netto"	Anti-tank rocket	Soviet Union
RPG-26 "Aglen"	Anti-tank rocket	Soviet Union
RPG-27 "Tavolga"	Anti-tank rocket	Soviet Union
RPG-28	Anti-tank rocket	Russia
RPG-29 "Vampir"	Anti-tank rocket	Soviet Union
RPG-30	Anti-tank rocket	Russia
RPG-32 "Hashim"	Anti-tank rocket	Russia
RPG-76 Komar	Anti-tank rocket	Poland
Sarpac	Anti-tank rocket	France
SMAW	Anti-tank rocket	USA
Type 69 RPG	Anti-tank rocket	China
Viper (FGR-17)	Anti-tank rocket	USA
Yasin	Anti-tank rocket	Palestine
Al-Najm al-Thaqib	Tactical rocket	Yemen
Bo-hiya	Tactical rocket	Japan
Congreve rocket	Tactical rocket	United Kingdom
M8 4.5-inch rocket	Tactical rocket	USA
M16 4.5-inch rocket	Tactical rocket	USA
Fajr-1	Tactical rocket	Iran
Fajr-3	Tactical rocket	Iran
Fajr-5	Tactical rocket	Iran
MGR-1 Honest John	Tactical rocket	USA
Mysorean rockets	Tactical rocket	United Kingdom
Khaibar-1	Tactical rocket	Syria
MGR-3 Little John (MGR-3)	Tactical rocket	USA
Qassam	Tactical rocket	Palestine
Singijeon	Tactical rocket	Korea
RP-3	Tactical rocket	United Kingdom
Saegheh	Tactical rocket	Iran
Ogbunigwe	Tactical rocket	Biafra
CY-1	Anti-submarine rocket	China
Mousetrap	Anti-submarine rocket	USA
RBU-1000 (RGB-10)	Anti-submarine rocket	Soviet Union
RBU-6000 (RGB-60)	Anti-submarine rocket	Soviet Union
ASROC (RUR-5)	Anti-submarine rocket	USA
RUR-4 Weapon Alpha	Anti-submarine rocket	USA
UDAV-1	Anti-submarine rocket	Soviet Union
2.25-inch sub-caliber aircraft rocket	Training rocket	USA
MQR-13 BMTS	Training rocket	USA
MQR-16 Gunrunner	Training rocket	USA
LOCAT	Training rocket	USA
GTR-18 Smokey Sam	Training rocket	USA

== See also ==
- List of missiles
