= RPG =

RPG may refer to:

== Military ==
- Rocket-propelled grenade, a shoulder-launched anti-tank weapon
  - Ruchnoi Protivotankoviy Granatomyot (Russian: Ручной Противотанковый Гранатомёт), hand-held anti-tank grenade launcher:
    - RPG-1
    - RPG-2
    - RPG-7
    - RPG-16
    - RPG-18
    - RPG-22
    - RPG-26
    - RPG-27
    - RPG-28
    - RPG-29
    - RPG-30
    - RPG-32
  - Ruchnaya Protivotankovaya Granata, hand-held anti-tank grenade:
    - RPG-6
    - RPG-40
    - RPG-43
- Regulation prescription glasses, eyeglasses issued by the American military

== Media and entertainment ==
- Role-playing game, a game in which players assume the roles of characters in a fictional setting
  - Role-playing video game, a video game genre
- RPG (film), a 2013 Portuguese science-fiction film
- "RPG", a song by Sekai no Owari
- "RPG", a song by Kehlani from her mixtape While We Wait

== Organizations ==
- RPG Group, an Indian business group
  - R. P. Goenka, an Indian industrialist, founder of the group
- RPG Life Sciences, an Indian pharmaceutical company
- Rally of the Guinean People (Rassemblement du Peuple Guinéen), a Guinean political party
- Ryanair Pilot Group, a Ryanair pilots' trade union
- Recycled Paper Greetings, a greeting card company based in Chicago, United States

== Science and technology ==
- IBM RPG, a computer programming language
- Retrograde pyelogram, a medical imaging procedure to visualize the urinary tract
- Ribosomal Protein Gene Database, see Eukaryotic small ribosomal subunit (40S)

== Other uses ==
- Rebounds per game, of basketball rebounds
