= RPG-29 =

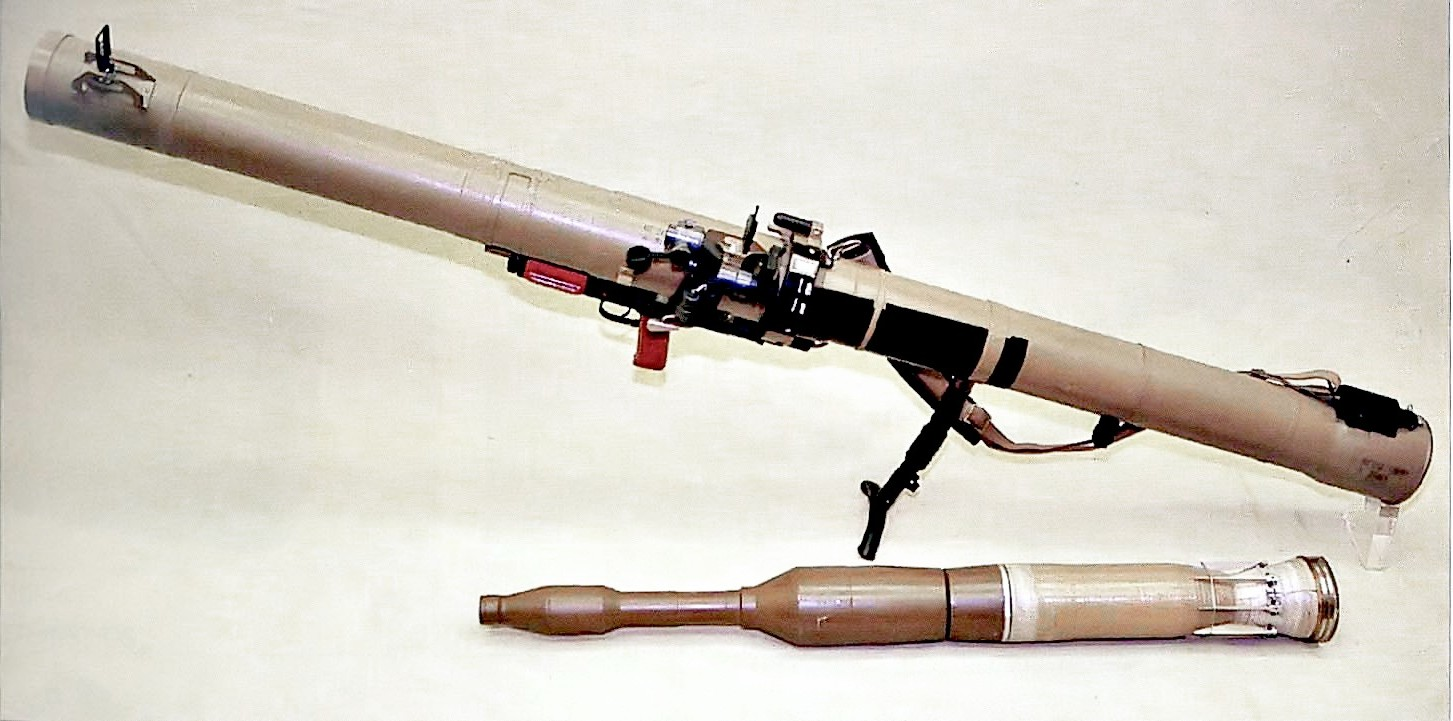
- RPG-29 launcher with PG-29V rocket
- Type: Rocket-propelled grenade
- Place of origin: Soviet Union

Service history
- In service: 1989–present
- Used by: See Operators
- Wars: War in Afghanistan; Iraq War; 2006 Lebanon War; Syrian civil war 2014 Gaza war War in Iraq (2013–2017); Gaza war

Production history
- Designer: Bazalt
- Designed: late 1980s
- Manufacturer: Bazalt
- Produced: 1989
- Variants: RPG-29M

Specifications
- Mass: 12.1 kg (27 lb) unloaded (with optical sight); 18.8 kg (41 lb) loaded (ready to fire) RPG-29M 4.4 kg (9.7 lb) unloaded (with thermal sight); 13.4 kg (30 lb) loaded (ready to fire)
- Length: 1 m (3 ft 3 in) (dismantled for transport); 1.85 m (6 ft 1 in) (ready to fire)
- Cartridge: PG-29V tandem rocket TBG-29V thermobaric rounds
- Caliber: 105 mm (4.1 in) barrel 65 and 105 mm (2.6 and 4.1 in) warheads
- Rate of fire: 2 rounds per minute
- Muzzle velocity: 280 m/s (920 ft/s)
- Effective firing range: 500 m (1,600 ft); 800 m (2,600 ft) (with tripod and fire control unit)
- Sights: Iron, optical, and night sights available with ranges up to 450 m (1,480 ft); automated day and day-night sights with laser rangefinder
- Blast yield: 750 mm (30 in) RHA; 650 mm (26 in) RHA after ERA; 1,500 mm (59 in) Reinforced concrete 3,700 mm (150 in) Log and earth fortification

The RPG-29 "Vampir" (Russian: РПГ-29 «Вампир», lit. 'Vampire'; GRAU index: TKB-0175; ТКБ-0175) is a Soviet rocket-propelled grenade (RPG) launcher. Adopted by the Soviet Army in 1989, it was the last RPG to be adopted by the Soviet Armed Forces before the fall of the Soviet Union in 1991.

The RPG-29 has since been supplemented by other rocket-propelled systems, such as the RPG-30 and RPG-32.

== Description ==
The RPG-29 is a shoulder-fired, unguided, tube-style, breech-loading anti-tank rocket system with an effective range of 500 m (1,600 ft). The light weapon is designed to be carried and used by one soldier. Atop the launch tube is a 2.7× 1P38 optical sight.

When launched, the missile deploys eight fins as the rocket leaves the launcher, stabilizing the rocket during flight, up to an effective range of 500 m (1,600 ft).

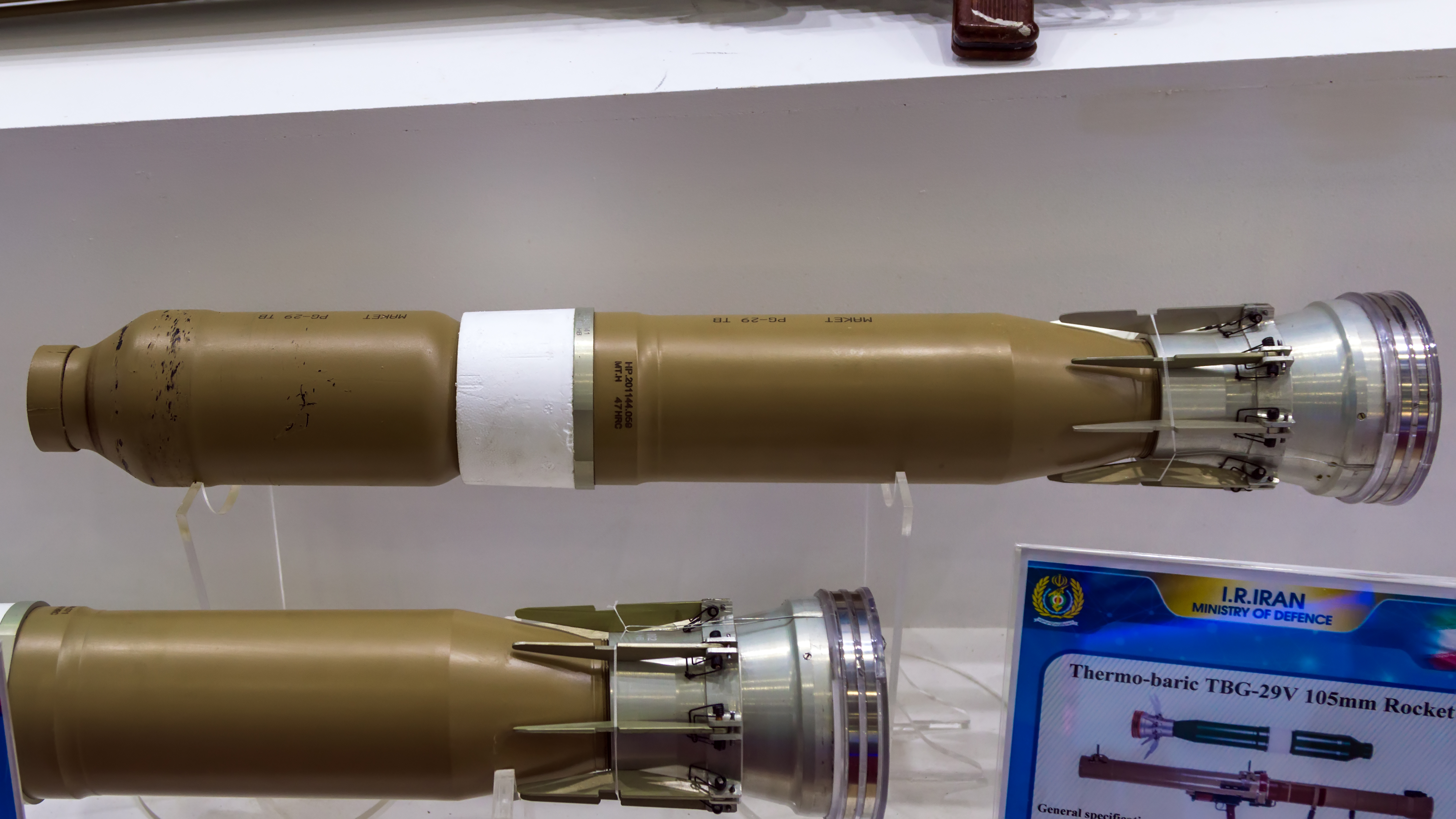
TBG-29V thermobaric round.

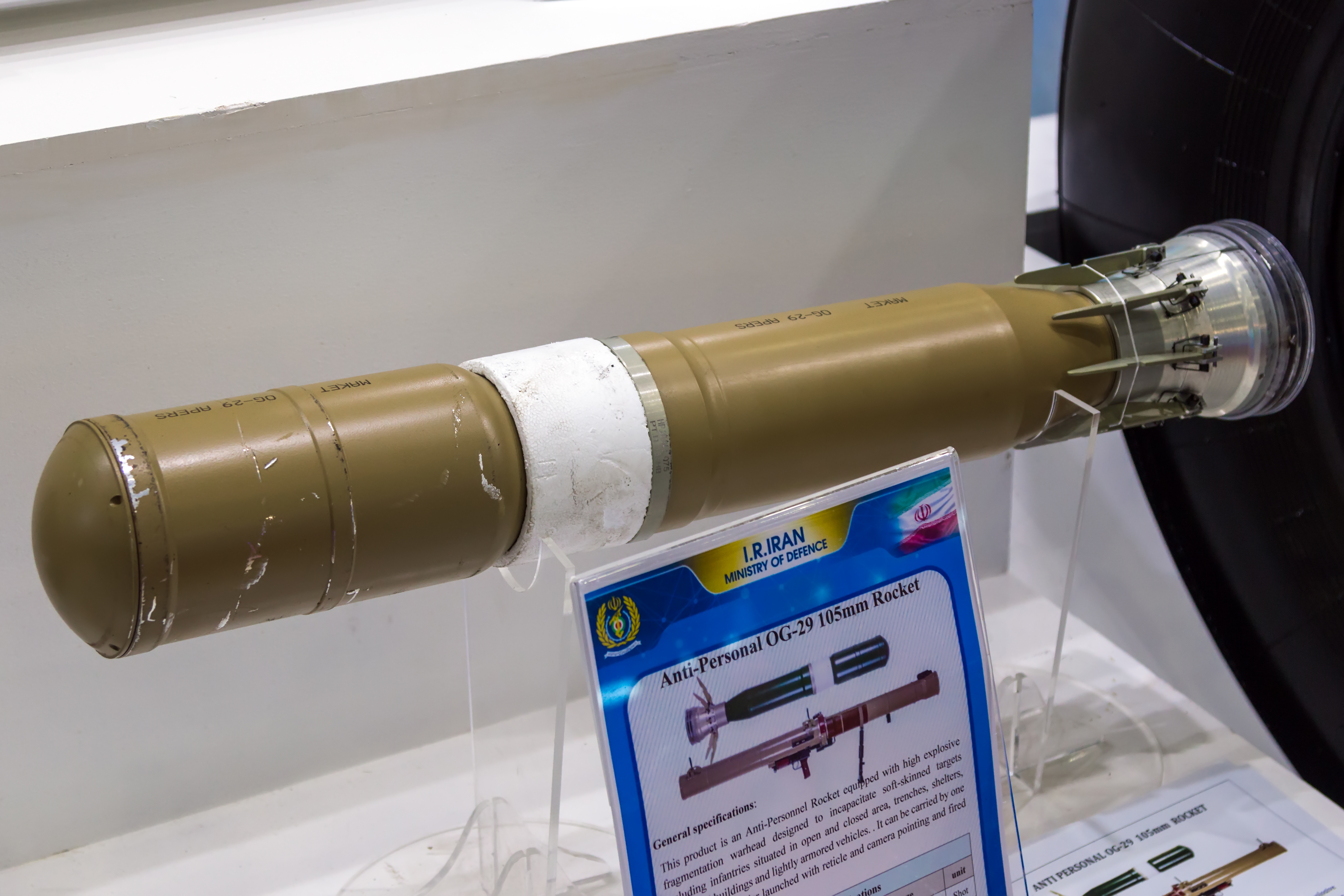
OG-29 HE/FRAG round.

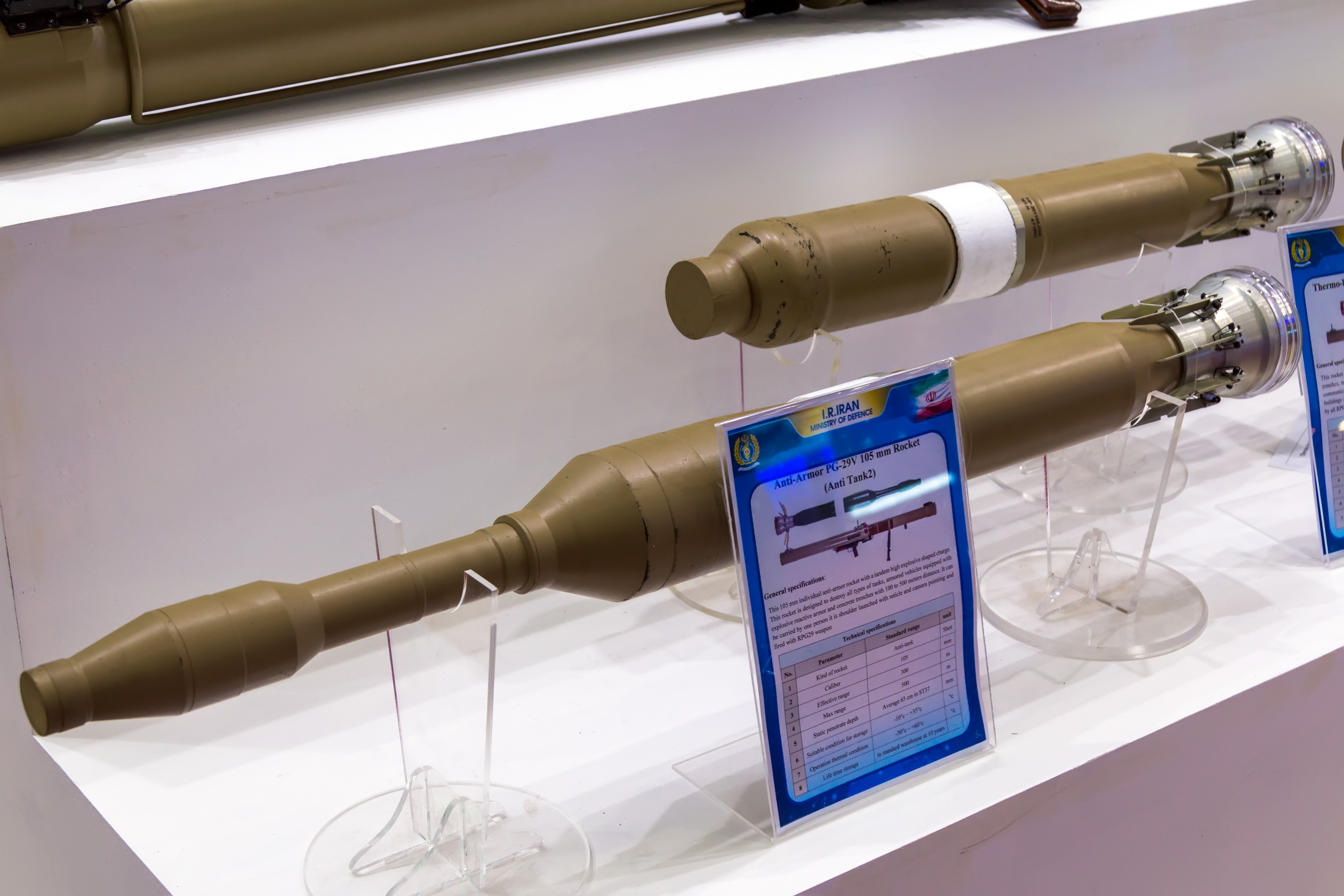
PG-29V HEAT round.

Three warheads are available for the weapon:

- The TBG-29V thermobaric anti-personnel round.
- The OG-29 high-explosive/fragmentation (HE/FRAG) round for anti-personnel purposes. This is an Iranian round produced by Shahed Weaponry with a time fuze and over 2,000 premade fragments.
- The PG-29V anti-tank/bunker round has a tandem-charge high-explosive anti-tank (HEAT) warhead to defeat explosive reactive armor (ERA). This warhead is standardized with that of the PG-7VR round fired by the RPG-7V rocket launcher. With a tandem-charge, an initial small charge detonates any reactive armor. If explosive reactive armor (ERA) or cage armor is absent, this charge strikes the main armor. Behind the primary charge, a much larger secondary shaped charge bursts at the rear of the initial warhead and projects a thin, high-speed-jet of metal into the armour compromised by the first charge. PG-29V can kill hard targets, including tanks with ERA.

The RPG-29 is unusual among Russian anti-tank rocket launchers in that it lacks an initial propellant charge to place the projectile at a safe distance from the operator before the rocket ignites. Instead, the rocket engine starts as soon as a trigger is pulled, and burns out before the projectile leaves the barrel.

On the bottom of the tube is a shoulder brace for proper positioning along with a pistol grip trigger mechanism. A side rail on its left side accepts a 1PN51-2 night sight.

== History ==
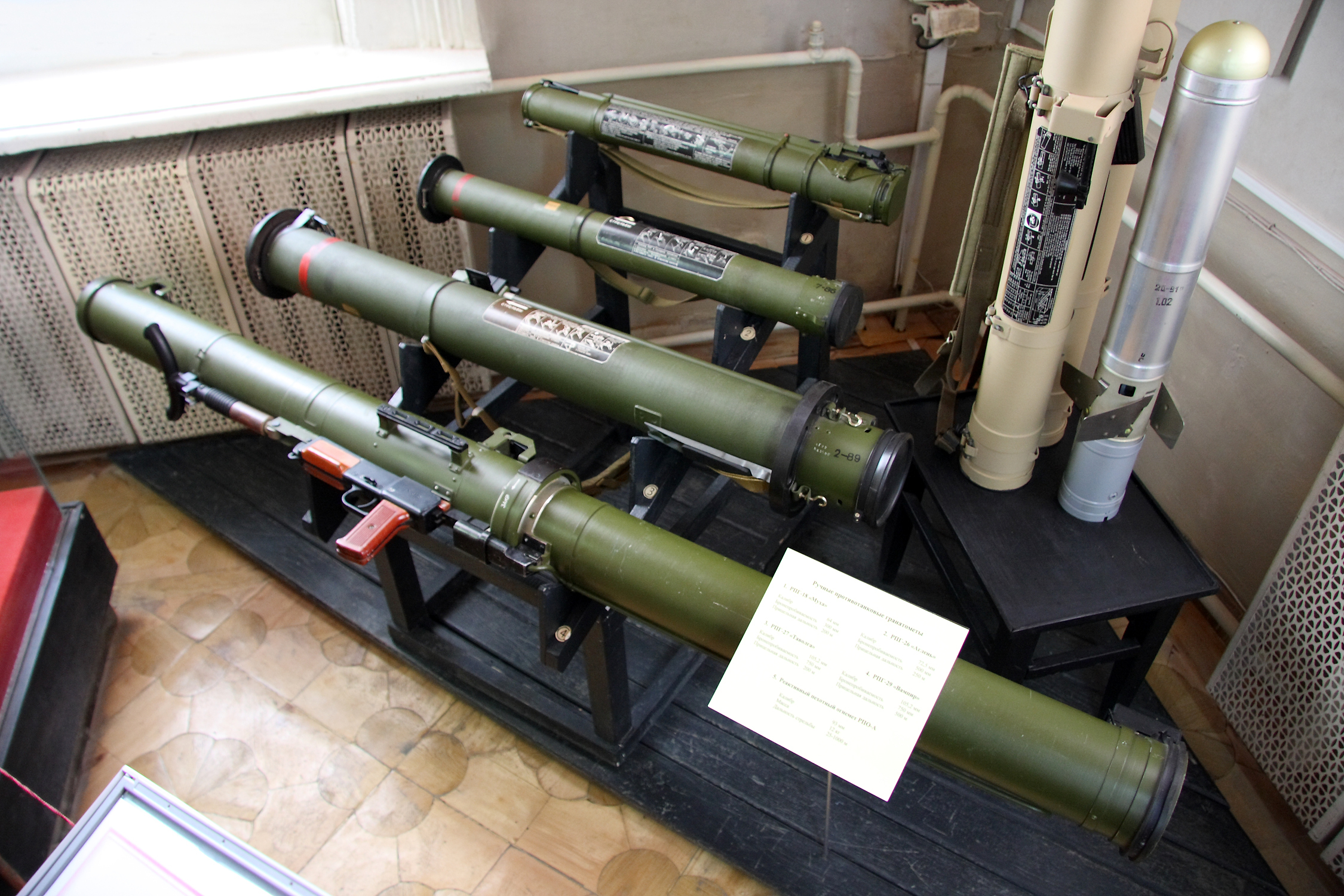
Size comparison. Closest to furthest. RPG-29, RPG-27, RPG-26, RPG-18

The RPG-29 was developed during the late 1980s, following the development of the RPG-26, and entered service with the Soviet Army in 1989. It has recently seen intermittent use by irregular forces in the Middle East theater, including in combat against Allied forces during the Iraq War, and the 2006 Lebanon War, when it was used against Israeli forces.

=== 2003 Iraq War ===
The RPG-29 is believed to have been used in skirmishes against American and British forces during the initial 2003 invasion of Iraq. An RPG-29 round was reported in August 2006 to have penetrated the lower glacis (equipped with ERA) of a Challenger 2 tank during an engagement in al-Amarah, Iraq, maiming one and wounding several other crew members, but only lightly damaging the tank, which drove home under its own power.

In May 2008, The New York Times disclosed that another M1 Abrams tank had also been damaged by an RPG-29 in Iraq, while fighting Shia militias at Sadr City. The US Army ranks the RPG-29 threat to armor so high that they refused to allow the newly formed Iraqi army to buy it, fearing that it would fall into insurgent hands.

=== 2006 Lebanon War ===
During the conflict, the Israeli newspaper Haaretz stated that the RPG-29 was a major source of Israel Defense Forces (IDF) casualties in the 2006 Lebanon War. Shortly before the end of the conflict the Russian Kommersant magazine acknowledged through anonymous sources the possibility of a weapons transfer between Syria and Hezbollah during the Syrian withdrawal from Lebanon.

=== Syrian Civil War ===
During the Syrian Civil War, Syrian Opposition Forces, Syrian Armed Forces and Islamic State (ISIL) used RPG-29s.

=== Mexican Drug War ===
The cartels are known to have smuggled RPG-29s with some seized by Mexican forces.

=== 2014 Gaza War ===
During the 2014 Gaza War, Hamas had RPG-29s in their inventory.

=== Iraqi Civil War ===
During the Iraqi Civil War, ISIL has used RPG-29s in Iraq, probably ones taken in Syria. And anti-ISIL Shia militias in Iraq have also used RPG-29s, the Iranian produced "Ghadir", which was supplied by Iran.

== Operators ==
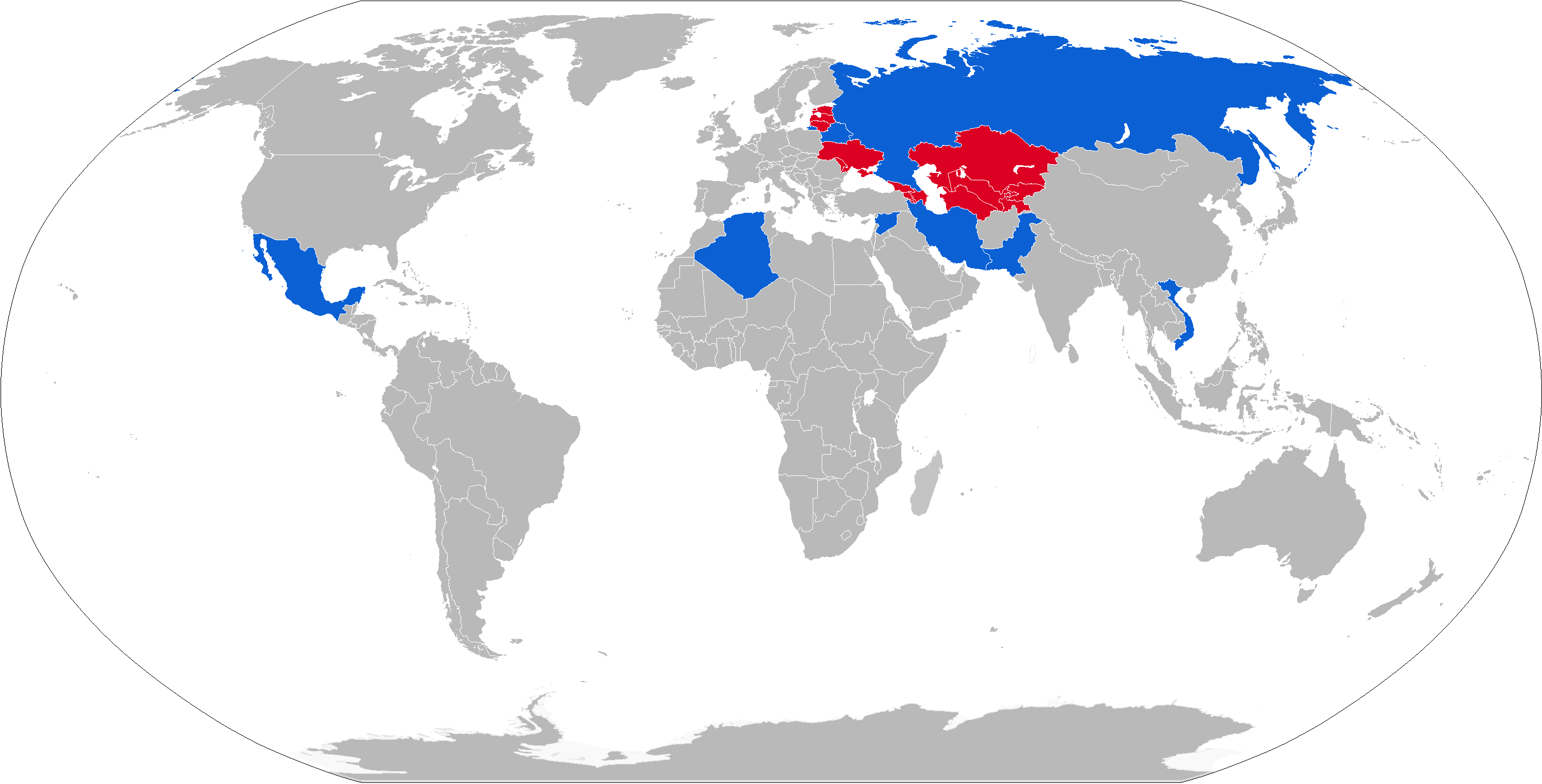
Operators Current Former

=== State operators ===
- Algeria
- Cuba
- Iran - Locally produced as the "Ghadir"
- Mexico - Locally produced
- North Korea
- Russia
- Syria
- Pakistan
- Ukraine
- Vietnam - Locally produced

=== Non-state organizations ===
- Hezbollah
- Hamas
- Iraqi insurgents (2003–11)
- Islamic State of Iraq and the Levant - At least one used during the Siege of Menagh Air Base in the Syrian Civil War
- Taliban (during 2013 through 2015)
- Syrian rebels

=== Former operators ===
- Soviet Union - Passed on to successor states.
- Ba'athist Syria

== See also ==
- M47 Dragon – (United States)
- PF-98 – (China)
- LRAC F1 – (France)
- M79 Osa – (Socialist Federal Republic of Yugoslavia)
- Rocket-propelled grenade (includes a description of tactics and history)

== Bibliography ==
- Galeotti, Mark (2017). The Modern Russian Army 1992–2016. Oxford: Osprey Publishing. ISBN 978-1472819086.
