= Folgore =

Folgore is the Italian word for lightning. It may refer to:

== Military ==
- Macchi C.202 Folgore, an Italian fighter of World War II
- Breda Folgore, an Italian anti-armor weapon
- Traditional name for paratroopers units of the Italian Army
  - 185th Infantry Division "Folgore", a World War II Italian Army unit
  - Paratroopers Brigade "Folgore", the modern Italian Army unit
- Folgore-class destroyer, a group of destroyers built for the Italian Navy in the 1930s
- Italian cruiser Folgore, a torpedo cruiser built in the 1880s

== Other uses ==
- Folgore da San Gimignano (1270–1332), Italian poet
- Parco Folgore, a character in the anime and manga series Zatch Bell!
- S.S. Folgore Falciano Calcio, or simply Falgore, a Sammarinese association football club
