= MRO-A =

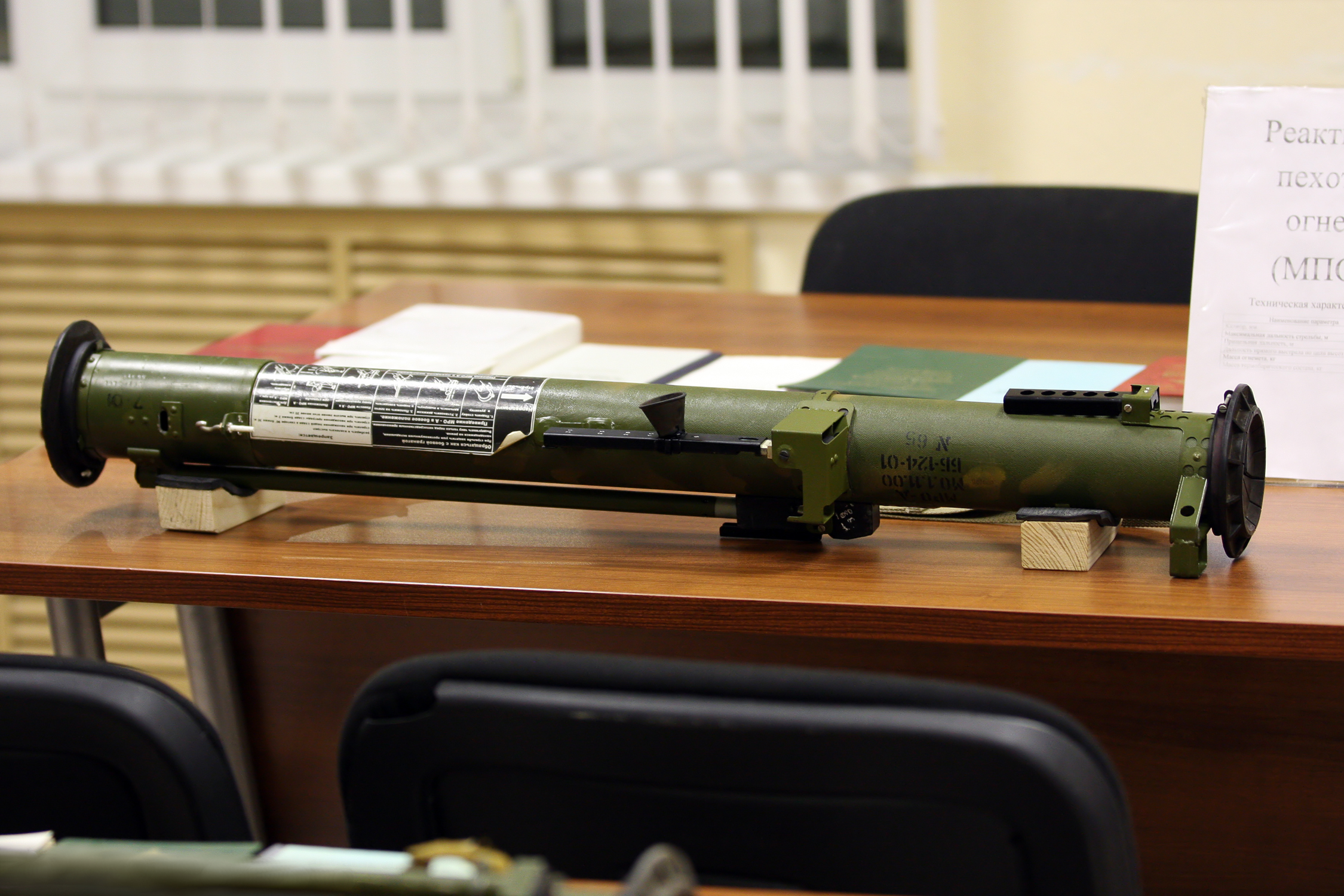
- MRO-D, smoke warhead variant
- Type: Disposable rocket-propelled grenade launcher
- Place of origin: Russia

Service history
- In service: 2003
- Wars: Second Chechen War; Syrian civil war Russo-Ukrainian War; 2024 Israeli invasion of Lebanon

Production history
- Designer: NPO Bazalt
- Designed: Late 1990s
- Manufacturer: NPO Bazalt
- Produced: 2003
- Variants: MRO-A (Thermobaric warhead), MRO-D (WP Smoke warhead), MRO-Z (Incendiary warhead)

Specifications
- Mass: 4.7 kg
- Length: 900 mm
- Shell weight: 2.9 kg (thermobaric warheads)
- Caliber: 72.5 mm
- Effective firing range: 90 m
- Maximum firing range: 450 m
- Sights: iron, MPO-A sighting devices are similar to those for flamethrower RPO-A

The MRO Borodach (Russian: малогабаритный реактивный огнемет, romanized: Malogabaritnyy reaktivnyy ognemet, lit. 'Small-sized jet flamethrower') is a Russian self-contained, disposable single shot 72.5 mm rocket launcher.

== Technical specification ==
- Calibre: 72.5 mm
- Length: 900 mm
- Weight: 4.7 kg
- Effective Range: 90 m
- Maximum Range: 450 m

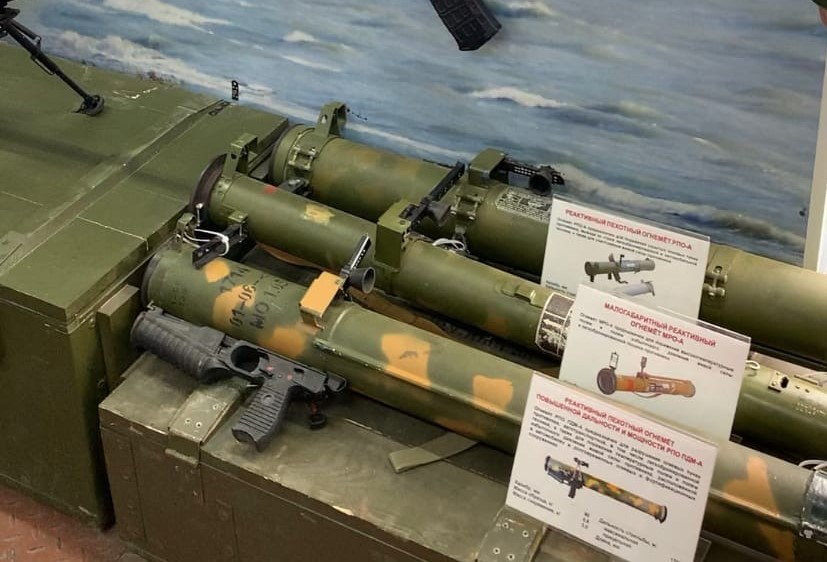
Hand-held rocket-assisted flamethrowers. Flamethrower MRO-A in the center

== Variants ==
=== MRO-A ===
Thermobaric warhead.

=== MRO-D ===
WP Smoke warhead

=== MRO-Z ===
Incendiary warhead

== Users ==
=== Current ===
- Hezbollah
- Russia
- Syria

=== Former ===
- Donetsk People's Republic
