= Rocket-propelled grenade =

Shoulder-launched anti-tank weapon

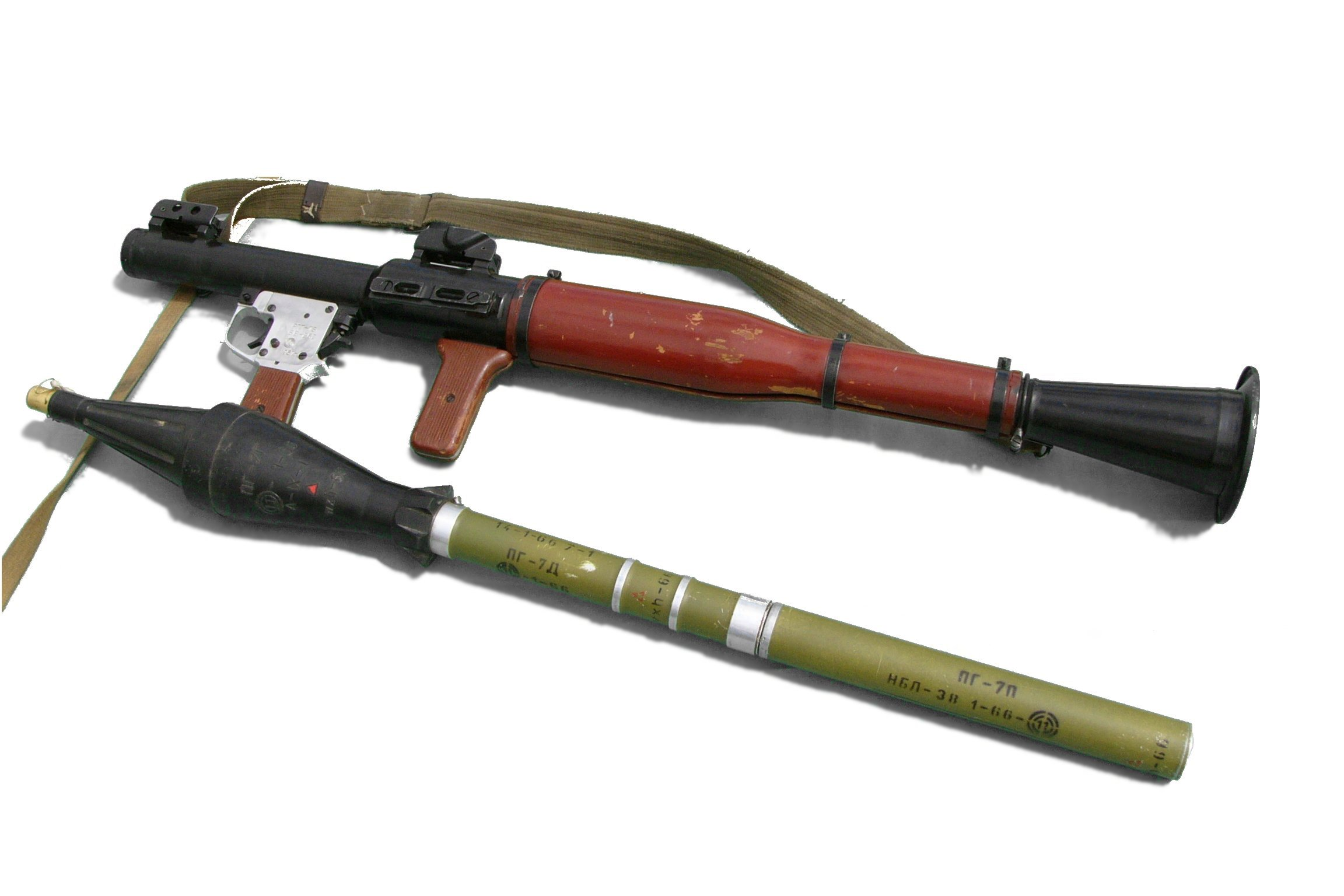
RPG-7 rocket launcher (top) with PG-7 rocket-propelled grenade. For use, the thinner, cylindrical part of the rocket-propelled grenade is inserted into the muzzle of the launcher.

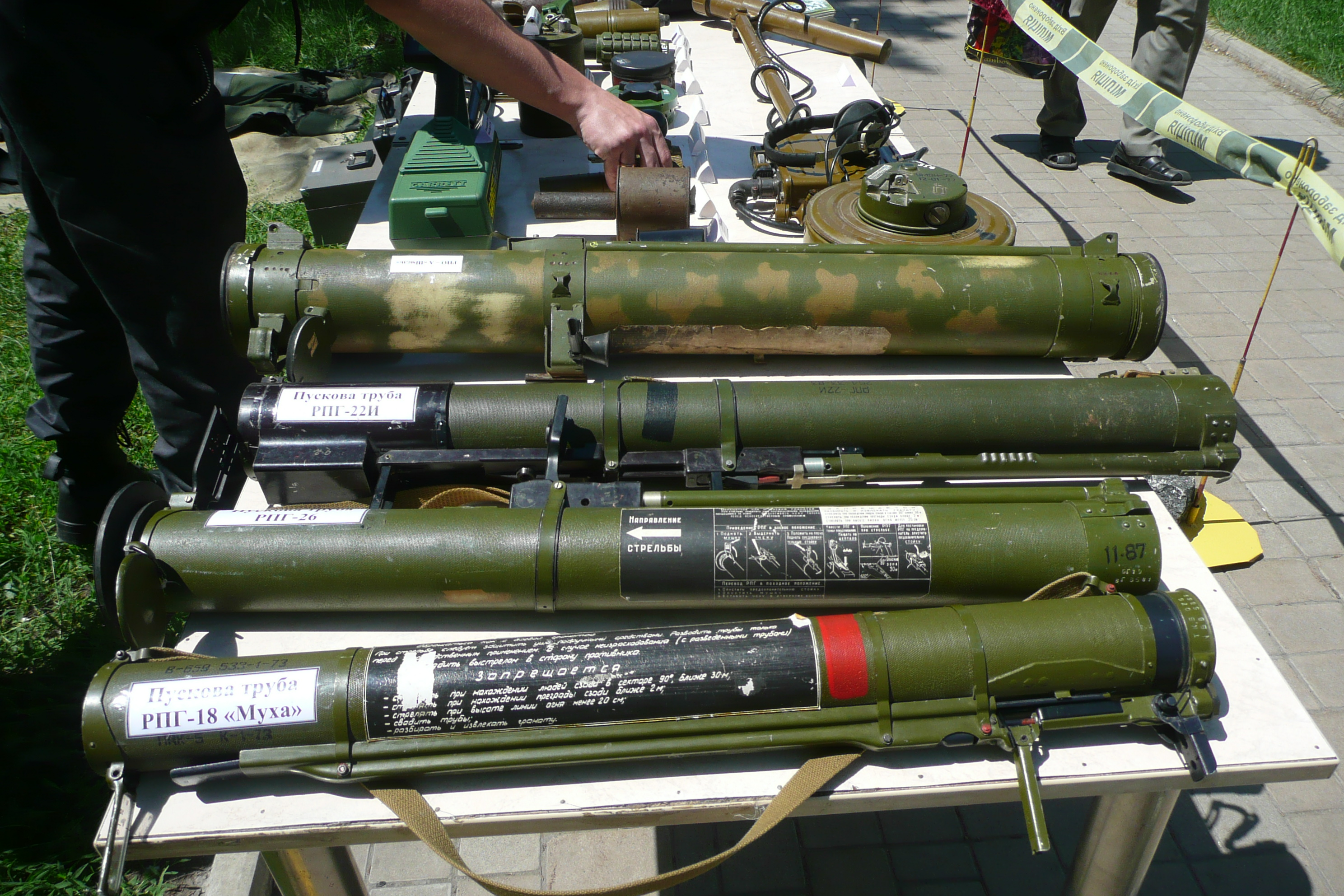
Soviet/Russian rocket launchers. From top to bottom: RPO-A Shmel, RPG-22, RPG-26, RPG-18.

A rocket-propelled grenade (RPG), also known colloquially as a rocket launcher, is a portable, reusable, unguided, shoulder-launched, anti-tank grenade launcher that launches rockets equipped with a shaped-charge explosive warhead. Most RPGs can be carried by an individual soldier, and are frequently used as anti-tank weapons. These warheads are affixed to a rocket motor which propels the RPG towards the target, stabilized in flight with fins. Some types of RPG are reloadable with new anti-tank grenades, while others are single-use. RPGs are generally loaded from the front.

RPGs with high-explosive anti-tank (HEAT) warheads are very effective against lightly armored vehicles such as armored personnel carriers (APCs) and armored cars. However, modern, heavily-armored vehicles, such as upgraded APCs and main battle tanks, are generally too well-protected (with thick composite or reactive armor) to be penetrated by an RPG, unless less armored sections of the vehicle are exploited. Various warheads are also capable of causing secondary damage to vulnerable systems (especially sights, tracks, rear and roof of turrets) and other unarmored targets.

The term "rocket-propelled grenade" is a backronym from the Russian acronym РПГ (ручной противотанковый гранатомёт, tr. ruchnoy protivotankovy granatomyot), meaning 'hand-held anti-tank grenade launcher', the name given to early Soviet designs.

== History ==
=== Predecessor weapons ===
The static nature of trench warfare in World War I encouraged the use of shielded defenses, even including personal armor, that were impenetrable by standard rifle ammunition. This led to some isolated experiments with higher caliber rifles, similar to elephant guns, using armor-piercing ammunition. The first tanks, the British Mark I, could be penetrated by these weapons under the right conditions. Mark IV tanks, however, had slightly thicker armor. In response, the Germans rushed to create an upgraded version of these early anti-armor rifles, the Tankgewehr M1918, the first anti-tank rifle. In the inter-war years, tank armor continued to increase overall, to the point that anti-tank rifles could no longer be effective against anything but light tanks; any rifle made powerful enough for heavier tanks would exceed the ability of a soldier to carry and fire the weapon.

Even with the first tanks, artillery officers often used field guns depressed to fire directly at armored targets. However, this practice expended much valuable ammunition and was of increasingly limited effectiveness as tank armor became thicker. This led to the concept of anti-tank guns, a form of artillery specifically designed to destroy armored fighting vehicles, normally from static defensive positions (that is, immobile during a battle).

The first dedicated anti-tank artillery began appearing in the 1920s, and by World War II was a common appearance in most armies. In order to penetrate armor they fired specialized ammunition from proportionally longer barrels to achieve a higher muzzle velocity than field guns. Most anti-tank guns were developed in the 1930s as improvements in tanks were noted, and nearly every major arms manufacturer produced one type or another.

Anti-tank guns deployed during World War II were manned by specialist infantry rather than artillery crews, and issued to infantry units accordingly. The anti-tank guns of the 1930s were of small caliber; nearly all major armies possessing them used 37 mm (1.5 in) ammunition, except for the British Army, which had developed the 40 mm (1.6 in) Ordnance QF 2-pounder. As World War II progressed, the appearance of heavier tanks rendered these weapons obsolete and anti-tank guns likewise began firing larger calibre and more effective armor-piercing shells. Although a number of large caliber guns were developed during the war that were capable of knocking out the most heavily armored tanks, they proved slow to set up and difficult to conceal. The latter generation of low-recoil anti-tank weapons, which allowed projectiles the size of an artillery shell to be fired from a man's shoulder, was considered a far more viable option for arming infantrymen.

=== First shaped charge, portable weapons ===
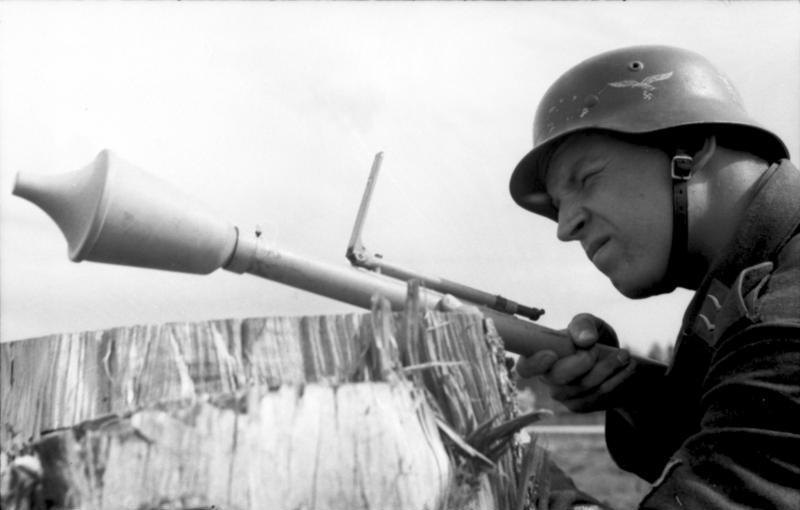
A Luftwaffe soldier using a Panzerfaust, a forerunner of modern-day RPGs

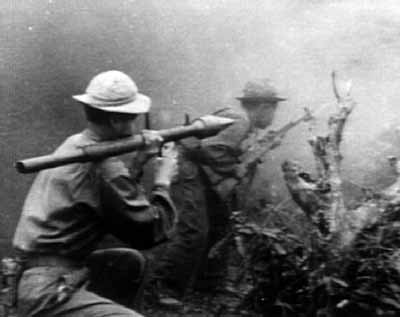
A North Vietnamese soldier using a Soviet made RPG-2

The RPG has its roots in the 20th century with the early development of the explosive shaped charge, in which the explosive is made with a conical hollow, which concentrates its power on the impact point. Before the adoption of the shaped charge, anti-tank guns and tank guns relied primarily on kinetic energy of metal projectiles to defeat armor. Soldier-carried anti-tank rifles such as the Boys anti-tank rifle could be used against lightly-armored tankettes and light armored vehicles. However, as tank armor increased in thickness and effectiveness, the anti-tank guns needed to defeat them became increasingly heavy, cumbersome and expensive. During WW II, as tank armor got thicker, larger calibre anti-tank guns were developed to defeat this thicker armor.

While larger anti-tank guns were more effective, their weight meant that they increasingly were mounted on wheeled, towed platforms. This meant that if the infantry was on foot, they might not have access to these wheeled, vehicle-towed anti-tank guns. This led to situations where infantry could find themselves defenseless against tanks and unable to attack tanks. Armies found that they needed to give infantry a human-portable (i.e., carried by one soldier) weapon to defeat enemy armor when no wheeled anti-tank guns were available, since anti-tank rifles were no longer effective. Initial attempts to put such weapons in the hands of the infantry resulted in weapons like the Soviet RPG-40 "blast effect" hand grenade (where "RPG" stood for ruchnaya protivotankovaya granata, meaning hand-held anti-tank grenade). However, being hand thrown weapons, they still had to be deployed at suicidally close range to be effective. What was needed was a means of delivering the shaped charge warhead from a distance. Different approaches to this goal would lead to the anti-tank spigot mortar, the recoilless rifle, and, from the development of practical rocketry, the RPG.

Research occasioned by World War II produced such weapons as the American bazooka, British/Allied PIAT and German Panzerfaust, which combined portability with effectiveness against armored vehicles, such as tanks. The Soviet-developed RPG-7 is the most widely distributed, recognizable and used RPG in the world. The basic design of this RPG was developed by the Soviets shortly after World War II in the form of the RPG-2, which is similar in function to the bazooka (due to the reloadability) and the Panzerfaust (due to an oversized grenade that protrudes outside of a smaller launch tube and the recoilless launch), though the rounds it fires lack a form of propulsion in addition to the launch charge (unlike the RPG-7 rounds, which also feature a sustainer motor, effectively making the rounds rocket propelled grenades).

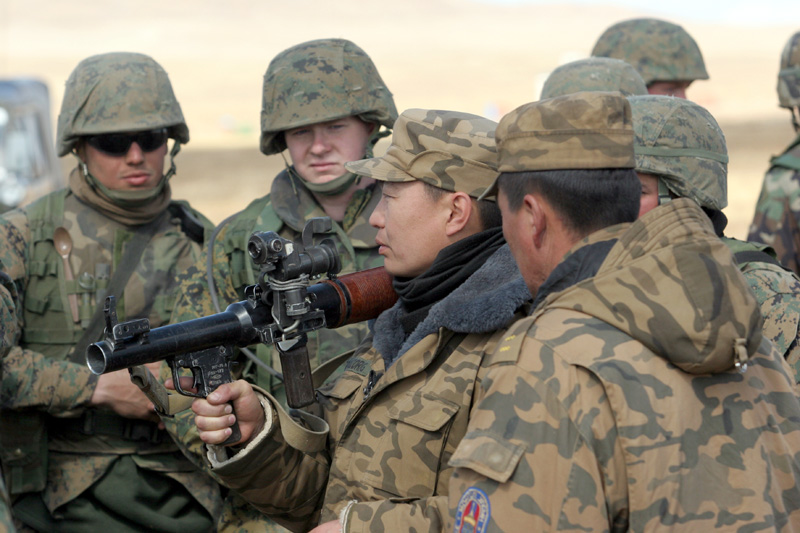
A Mongolian soldier showing an unloaded RPG launcher to a group of US marines

Soviet RPGs were used extensively during the Vietnam War (by the Vietnam People's Army and Vietcong), as well as during the Soviet invasion of Afghanistan by the Mujahideen and against South Africans in Angola and Namibia (formerly South West Africa) by SWAPO guerillas during what the South Africans called the South African Border War. In the 2000s, they were still being used widely in conflict areas such as Chechnya, Iraq, and Sri Lanka. Militants have also used RPGs against helicopters: Taliban fighters shot down U.S. CH-47 Chinook helicopters in June 2005 and August 2011; and Somali militiamen shot down two U.S. UH-60 Black Hawk helicopters during the Battle of Mogadishu in 1993.

RPGs were used by militants to destroy "hundreds" of vehicles (AFVs, armored Humvees etc) in the War in Afghanistan (2001–2021).

== Design ==
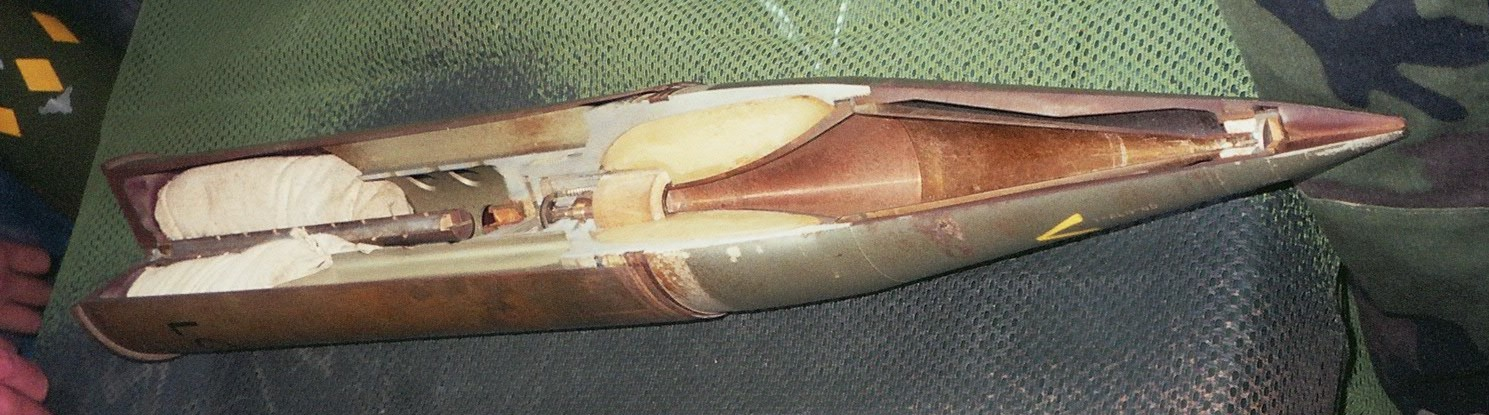
Sectioned high-explosive anti-tank round with the inner shaped charge visible

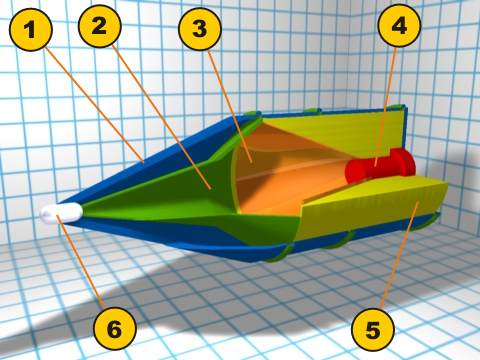
A diagram of a high-explosive anti-tank (HEAT) warhead of an RPG rocket (the propellant section is not shown) 1: Aerodynamic cover; 2: Air-filled cavity; 3: Conical liner; 4: Detonator; 5: Explosive; 6: Piezo-electric trigger

The RPG warhead being used against tanks and other armor often has a shaped charge explosive warhead. A shaped charge is an explosive charge shaped to focus the effect of the explosive's energy. Various types are used to penetrate tank armor; typical modern lined shaped charge can penetrate steel armor to a depth of seven or more times the diameter of the charge (charge diameters, CD), though greater depths of 10 CD and above have been achieved. Despite the popular misconception that shaped charges "melt" tank armor, the shaped charge does not depend in any way on heating or melting for its effectiveness; that is, the superplastic metal jet from a shaped charge impact on armor forms mainly due to a sudden and intense mechanical stress and does not melt its way through armor, as its effect is purely due to kinetic energy in nature.

An RPG comprises two main parts: the launcher and a rocket equipped with a warhead that follows a ballistic trajectory after the rocket motor has completed its burn. The most common types of warheads are high explosive (HE) and high-explosive anti-tank (HEAT) rounds. HE rounds can be used against troops or unarmored structures or vehicles. HEAT rounds can be used against armored vehicles. These warheads are affixed to a rocket motor and stabilized in flight with fins. Some types of RPG are single-use disposable units, such as the RPG-22 and M72 LAW; with these units, once the rocket is fired, the entire launcher is disposed of. Others are reloadable, such as the Soviet RPG-7 and the Israeli B-300. With reloadable RPGs, a new rocket can be inserted into the muzzle of the weapon after firing.

An issue that affected the earliest RPG weapon systems such as the German Panzerschreck was that rocket motor propellant could harm the operator. The weapon therefore featured a metal shield attached to the launch tube to protect the operator's face from the blast. With later designs such as the RPG-7, the rocket exits the launcher with a low-powered gunpowder charge, and the main rocket motor then fires after the rocket has travelled 10 m (33 ft). In some other designs, the propellant charge burns completely within the tube.

An RPG is an inexpensive way for an infantryman to safely deliver an explosive payload or warhead over a short distance with reasonable accuracy. Substantially more expensive guided anti-tank missiles are used at larger distances when accuracy or an overfly top attack are paramount. Anti-tank missiles such as the Malyutka can be guided by the operator after firing, in the case of the Malyutka, a joystick, while others can be guided using heat sensors or IR signatures; an RPG, however, is not guided towards the target, Nor can RPG rockets be controlled in flight after being aimed and launched. While the lack of active targeting technologies or after-firing guidance input can be viewed as a weakness, it also makes RPGs cheap and hard to defend against with electronic countermeasures or decoying. For example, if a soldier or other fighter launches an RPG at a hovering helicopter, even if the helicopter releases flares to confuse optical seekers, chaff to confuse radar, or engages in signal jamming, these will have no effect on an in-flight RPG warhead, even though these measures might protect against more sophisticated surface-to-air missiles.

=== Warheads ===
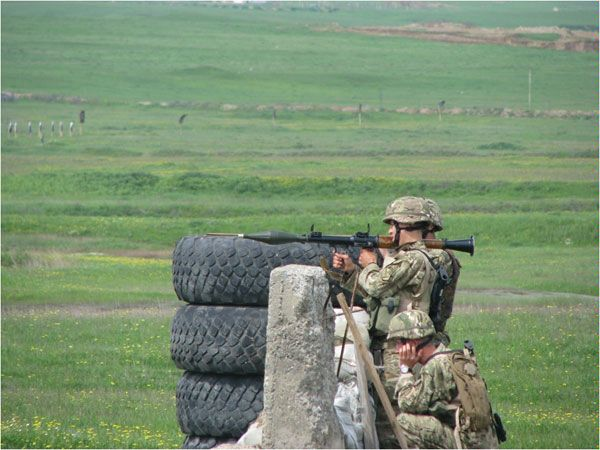
Georgian soldiers prepare to fire a RPG

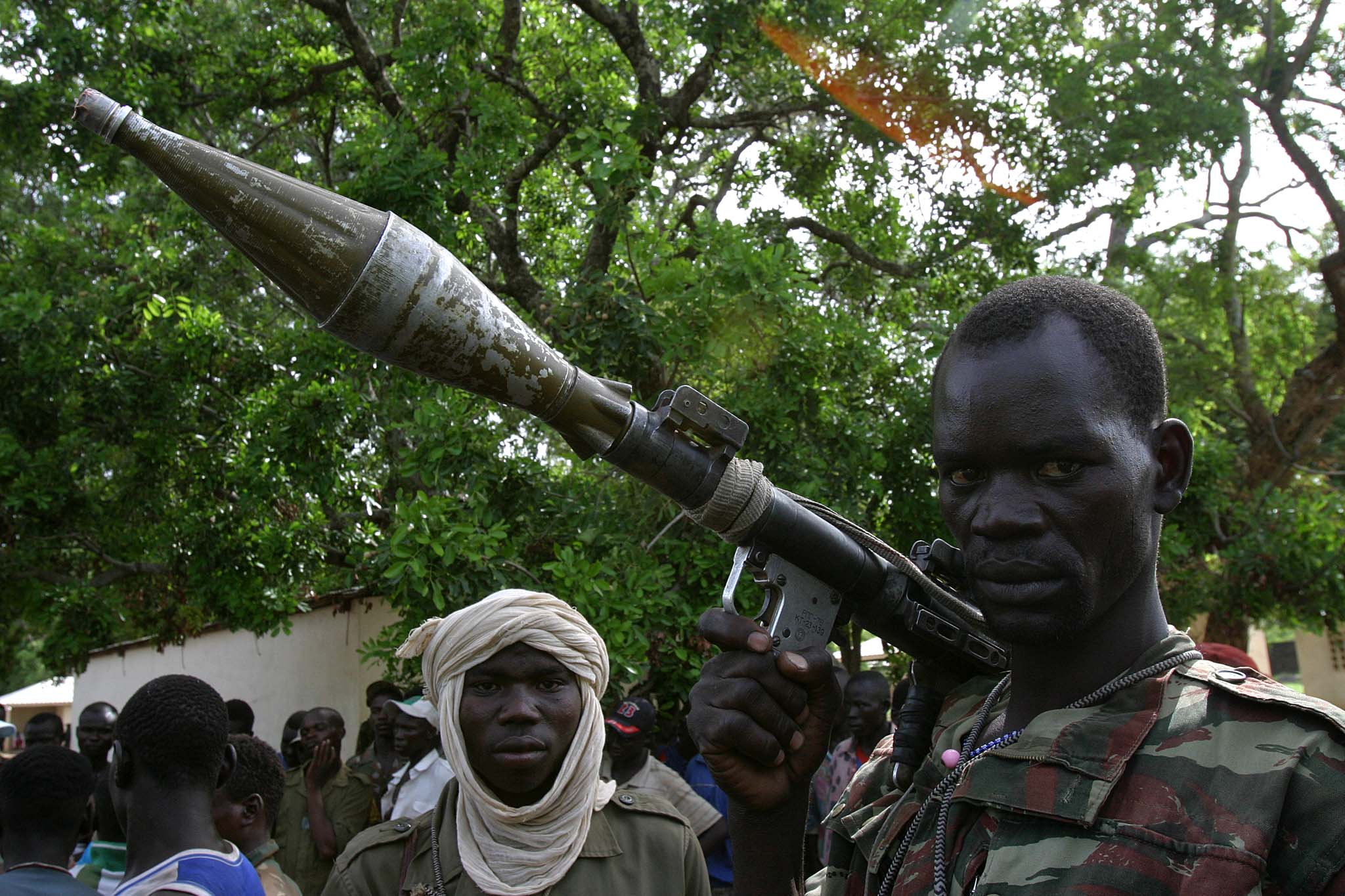
A rebel in the northern Central African Republic holding a loaded RPG

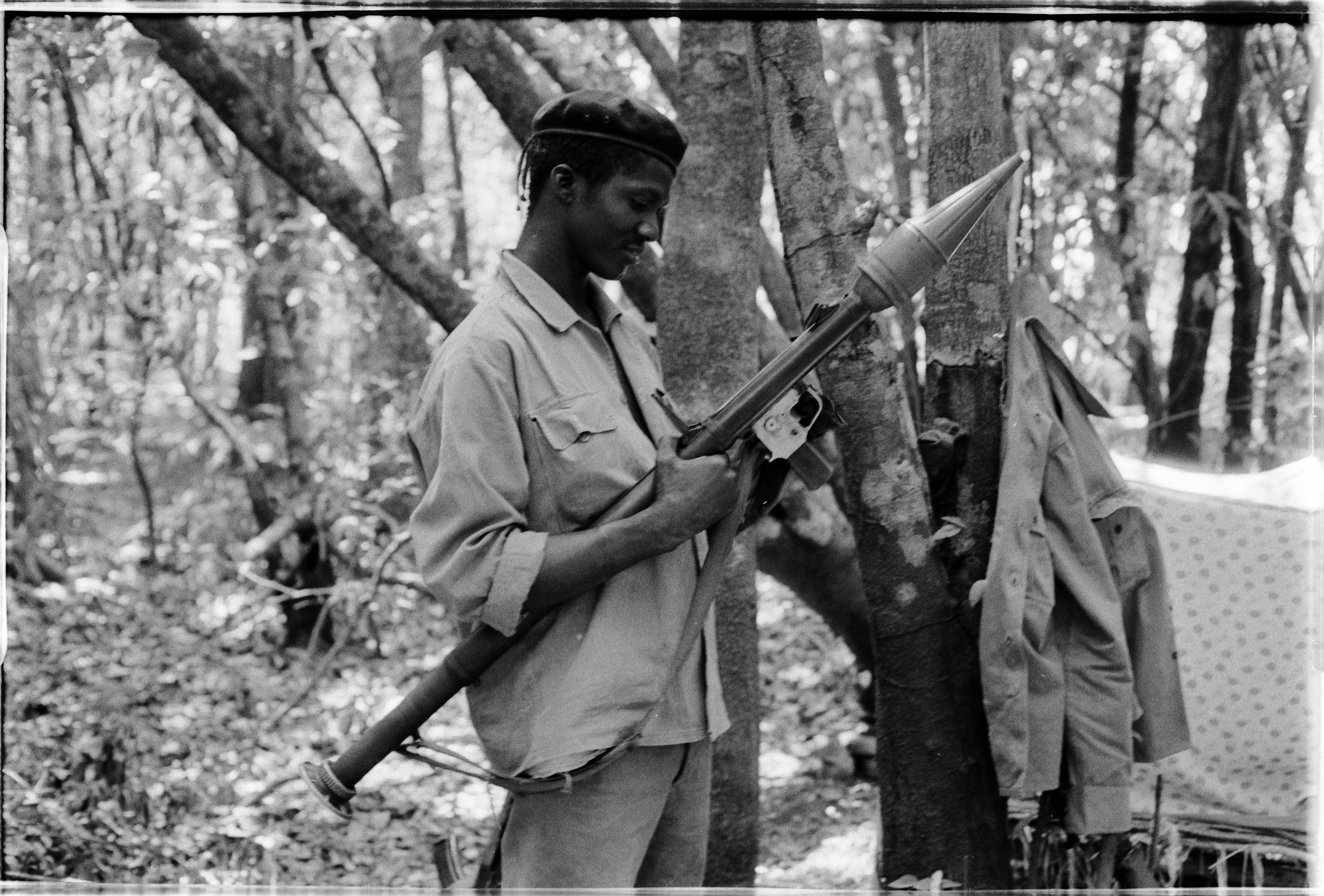
Guerilla of the PAIGC resistance movement against Portugal holding an RPG in Guinea-Bissau, 1974

The HEAT (high-explosive anti-tank) round is a standard shaped charge warhead, similar in concept to those used in many tank cannon rounds. In this type of warhead, the shape of the explosive material within the warhead focuses the explosive energy on a copper (or similar metal) lining. This heats the metal lining and propels some of it forward at a very high velocity in a highly plastic state. The resulting narrow jet of metal can defeat armor equivalent to several hundred millimeters of RHA, such as that used in light and medium armored vehicles. However, heavily armored vehicles, such as main battle tanks, are generally too well armored to be penetrated by an RPG, unless weaker sections of the armor are exploited. Various warheads are also capable of causing secondary damage to vulnerable systems (especially sights, tracks, rear and roof of turrets) and other soft targets. The warhead detonates on impact or when the fuse runs out; usually the fuse is set to the maximum burn of the rocket motor, but it can be shortened for improvised anti aircraft purposes.

Specialized warheads are available for illumination, smoke, tear gas, and white phosphorus. Russia, China, and many former Warsaw Pact nations have also developed a fuel-air explosive (thermobaric) warhead. Another recent development is a tandem HEAT warhead capable of penetrating reactive armor.

So-called PRIGs (propelled recoilless improvised grenade) were improvised warheads used by the Provisional IRA.

=== Effectiveness ===
The RPG-29 uses a tandem-charge high-explosive anti-tank warhead to penetrate explosive reactive armor (ERA) as well as composite armor behind it.

In August 2006, in al-Amarah, in Iraq, a Soviet RPG-29 damaged the front underside of a Challenger 2 tank, detonating ERA in the area of the driver's cabin. The driver lost part of a foot and two more of the crew were injured, but the driver was able to reverse 2.4 km (1.5 mi) to an aid post. The incident was not made public until May 2007; in response to accusations, the MoD said "We have never claimed that the Challenger 2 is impenetrable." Since then, the ERA has been replaced with a Dorchester block and the steel underbelly lined with armor, as part of the 'Streetfighter' upgrade, which was a direct response to this incident. In May 2008, The New York Times disclosed that an American M1 tank had also been damaged by an RPG-29 in Iraq. The American army is ranking the RPG-29 threat to American armor as high; they have refused to allow the newly formed Iraqi army to buy it, fearing that it would fall into the hands of insurgents.

Various armies and manufacturers have developed add-on tank armor and other systems for urban combat, such as the Tank Urban Survival Kit (TUSK) for M1 Abrams, slat armor for the Stryker, ERA kit for the FV432, AZUR for Leclerc, and others. Similar solutions are active protection systems (APS), engaging and destroying closing projectiles, such as the Russian Drozd and Arena, as well as the recent Israeli Trophy Active Protection System.

The RPG-30 was designed to address the threat of active protection systems on tanks by using a false target to trick the APS. The RPG-30 shares a close resemblance with the RPG-27 in that it is a man-portable, disposable anti-tank rocket launcher with a single-shot capacity. However, unlike the RPG-27, there is a smaller diameter precursor round in a smaller side barrel tube in addition to the main round in the main tube. This precursor round acts as a false target, tricking the target's active protection system into engaging it, allowing the main round a clear path into the target, while the APS is stuck in the 0.2–0.4 second delay it needs to start its next engagement. Recent German systems were able to reduce reaction delay to mere milliseconds, cancelling this advantage.

The PG-30 is the main round of the RPG-30. The round is a 105 mm (4.1 in) tandem shaped charge with a weight of 10.3 kg (23 lb) and has a range of 200 m (660 ft) and a stated penetration capability in excess of 600 mm (24 in) rolled homogeneous armor (RHA) (after ERA), 1,500 mm (59 in) reinforced concrete, 2,000 mm (79 in), and 3,700 mm (150 in) of soil. Reactive armor, including explosive reactive armor (ERA), can be defeated with multiple hits into the same place, such as by tandem-charge weapons, which fire two or more shaped charges in rapid succession.

=== Protection ===
An early method of disabling shaped charges developed during World War II was to apply thin skirt armor or meshwire at a distance around the hull and turret of the tank. The skirt or mesh armor (cage armor) triggers the RPG on contact and much of the energy that a shaped charge produces dissipates before coming into contact with the main armor of the vehicle. Well-sloped armor also gives some protection because the shaped charge is forced to penetrate a greater amount of armor due to the oblique angle. The benefits of cage armor are still considered great in modern battlefields in the Middle East, and although similar effects can be obtained using spaced armor, either as a part of the original design or as appliqué armor fitted later, cage armor is preferable due to its low weight and ease of repair.

Today, technologically advanced armies have implemented composite armors such as Chobham armour, which provide superior protection to steel. For added protection, vehicles may be retrofitted with reactive armor; on impact, reactive tiles explode or deform, disrupting the normal function of the shaped charge. Russian and Israeli vehicles also use active protection systems such as Drozd, Arena APS or Trophy. Such a system detects and shoots down incoming projectiles before they reach the vehicle. As in all arms races, these developments in armor countermeasures have led to the development of RPG rounds designed specifically to defeat them, with methods such as a tandem-charge warhead, which has two shaped charges, of which the first is meant to activate any reactive armor, and the second to penetrate the vehicle.

== Weapons by country ==
=== Soviet Union and Russian Federation ===
Specific types of RPGs (current, past and under development) include:

- Anti-personnel explosives
  - RPG-7: Reloadable RPG launcher, TBG-7V thermobaric rocket and OG-7V fragmentation grenade
  - RPG-27 "Tavolga": One-shot disposable RPG launcher, RShG-1 thermobaric rockets
  - RShG-1
  - RShG-2
  - RPG-29 "Vampir": Reloadable RPG launcher, TBG-29 thermobaric rockets
  - RPO Rys
  - RPO-A Shmel
  - MGK Bur
  - MRO-A
- Anti-tank explosives
  - RPG-1
  - RPG-2
  - RPG-7: Reloadable RPG launcher, PG-7VL with ≈500 mm (20 in) RHA penetration, PG-7VR with ≈600 mm (24 in) RHA penetration after ERA
  - RPG-16: Reloadable RPG launcher, PG-16 with ≈300 mm (12 in) RHA penetration, higher accuracy and four times the range of the RPG-7
  - RPG-18 "Muha (Fly)": One-shot disposable RPG launcher, PG-18 with ≈375 mm (14.8 in) RHA penetration
  - RPG-22 "Netto (Nett)": One-shot disposable RPG launcher, PG-22 with ≈400 mm (16 in) RHA penetration
  - RPG-26 "Aglen": One-shot disposable RPG launcher, PG-26 with ≈500 mm (20 in) RHA penetration
  - RPG-27 "Tavolga": One-shot disposable RPG launcher, PG-27 with ≈750 mm (30 in) RHA penetration after ERA
  - RPG-28 "Klyukva": One-shot disposable RPG launcher, with ≈1,000 mm (39 in) RHA penetration after ERA
  - RPG-29 "Vampir": Reloadable RPG launcher, PG-29V with ≈750 mm (30 in) RHA penetration after ERA
  - RPG-30 One-shot disposable RPG launcher, with a 'precursor' forerunner additional sub-munition, intended to defeat Active Defense Systems like Trophy. ≈650 mm (26 in) RHA penetration after active protection.
  - RPG-32 "Barkas": Latest variant of RPG 105 mm (4.1 in) Caliber, PG-32V with ≈650 mm (26 in) RHA penetration
- Bunker buster explosives
  - RMG One-shot disposable RPG launcher of 105 mm (4.1 in) Caliber, PG-27V with ≈120 mm (4.7 in) RHA penetration

=== United States ===
The United States Army developed a lightweight antitank weapon (LAW) in the middle 1950s. By 1961, the M72 LAW was in use. It is a shoulder-fired, disposable rocket launcher with HEAT warhead. It is a recoilless weapon, which is easy to use, and effective against armored vehicles. It was used during the Vietnam War, and is still in use today. It uses a fin-stabilized rocket. In response to the threat of thicker armor, this weapon was replaced by the AT4 recoilless gun, a larger & non-collapsible – albeit still single-shot weapon.

The United States Army and Marine Corps also use a different launcher, which is reloadable – the M3 Multi-role Anti-armor Anti-tank Weapon System (MAAWs) derived from the 84mm Carl Gustav and the 83mm Shoulder-Launched Multipurpose Assault Weapon (SMAW) derived from the Israeli B-300. Unlike the RPG, they are both reloaded from the breech-end rather than the muzzle.

- Bazooka
- M72 LAW
- M3 Multi-role Anti-armor Anti-tank Weapon System (MAAWS)
- Mk 153 Shoulder-Launched Multipurpose Assault Weapon (SMAW)
- M141 Bunker Defeat Munition
- PSRL-1

=== France ===
- LRAC F1
- RAC 112 (Apilas)

=== Germany ===
- Raketenpanzerbüchse Panzerschreck
- Panzerfaust 2
- Panzerfaust 3

=== Israel ===
- B-300 (SMAW)
- IMI Shipon
- MATADOR

=== Spain ===
- C90-CR (M3)

=== Czechoslovakia ===
- RPG-75

=== Poland ===
- RPG-76 Komar

=== Serbia ===
- M90 Stršljen

=== Yugoslavia ===
- M79 Osa
- M80 Zolja

=== China ===
- Type 69 RPG
- PF-89

=== Palestine ===
- Al-Bana
- Batar
- Yasin

=== Ukraine ===
- RK-4 Ingul

== Tactics ==
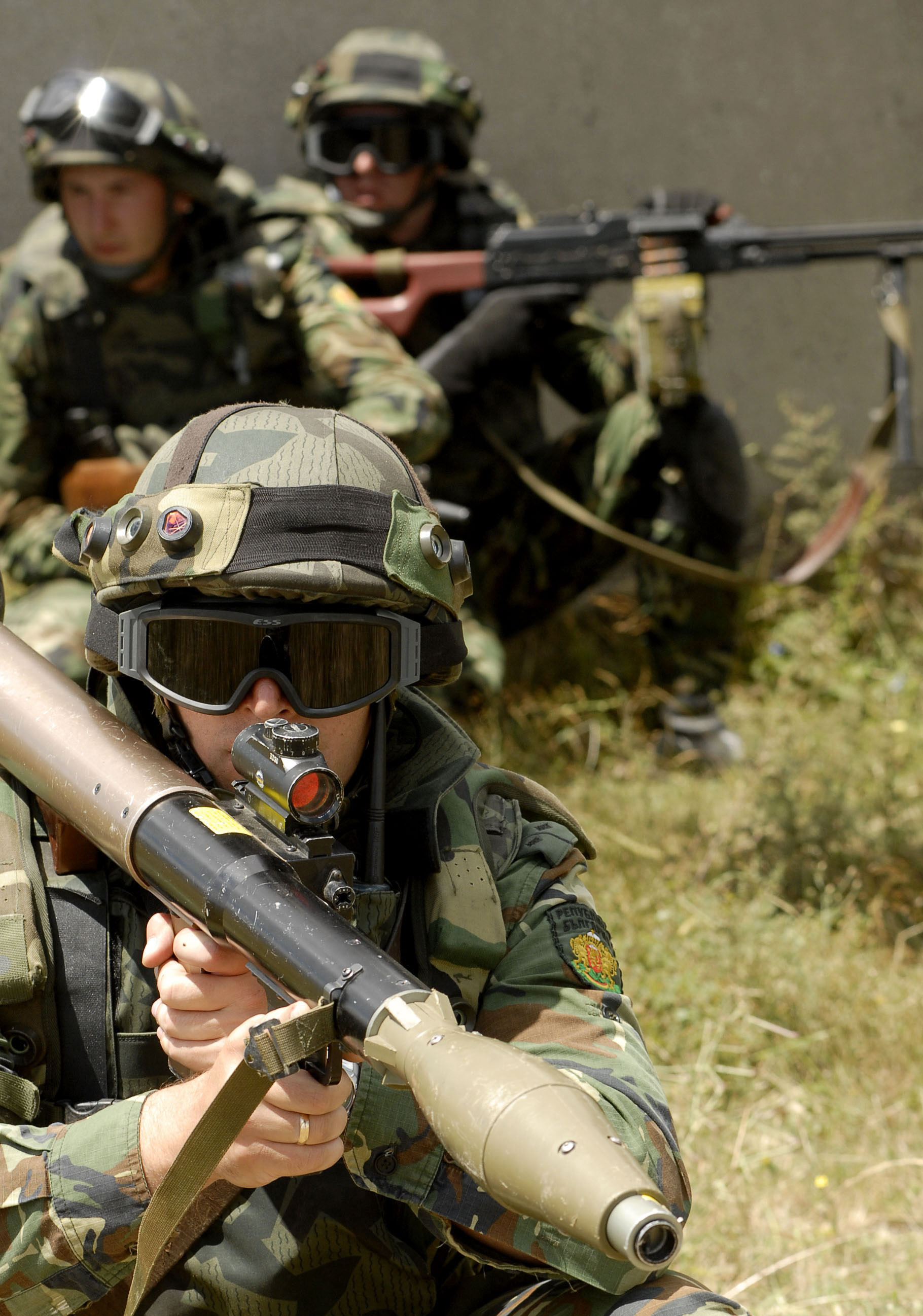
A Bulgarian soldier aims an RPG.

One of the first instances the weapon was used by militants was on January 13, 1975, at Orly Airport in France, when Carlos the Jackal, together with another member from the PFLP, used two Soviet RPG-7 grenades to attack an Israeli El Al airliner. Both missed the target, with one hitting a Yugoslav Airlines's DC-9 instead.

In Afghanistan, Mujahideen guerrillas used RPG-7s to destroy Soviet vehicles. To assure a kill, two to four RPG operators would be assigned to each vehicle. Each armored-vehicle hunter-killer team can have as many as 15 RPGs. In areas where vehicles were confined to a single path (a mountain road, swamps, snow, urban areas), RPG teams trapped convoys by destroying the first and last vehicles in line, preventing movement of the other vehicles. This tactic was especially effective in cities. Convoys learned to avoid approaches with overhangs and to send infantrymen forward in hazardous areas to detect the RPG teams.

Multiple shooters were also effective against heavy tanks with reactive armor: The first shot would be against the driver's viewing prisms. Following shots would be in pairs, one to set off the reactive armor, the second to penetrate the tank's armor. Favored weak spots were the top and rear of the turret.

Afghans sometimes used RPG-7s at extreme range, exploded by their 4.5-second self-destruct timer, which translates to roughly 950 m (3,120 ft) flight distance, as a method of long distance approach denial for infantry and reconnaissance. The most noteworthy use of RPGs against aircraft in Afghanistan occurred on August 6, 2011, when Taliban fighters shot down a U.S. CH-47 Chinook helicopter killing all 38 personnel on board including SEAL Team 6 from a range of 220 m (720 ft). An earlier anti-aircraft kill by the Taliban occurred during Operation Red Wings, on June 28, 2005, when a Chinook helicopter was destroyed by unguided RPG.

In the period following the 2003 invasion of Iraq, the RPG-7 became a favorite weapon of the insurgent forces fighting U.S. troops. Since most of the readily available RPG-7 rounds cannot penetrate M1 Abrams tank armor from almost any angle, it is primarily effective against soft-skinned or lightly armored vehicles, and infantry. Even if the RPG hit does not completely disable the tank or kill the crew, it can still damage external equipment, lowering the tank's effectiveness or forcing the crew to abandon and destroy it. Newer RPG-7 rounds are more capable, and in August 2006, an RPG-29 round penetrated the frontal ERA of a Challenger 2 tank during an engagement in al-Amarah, Iraq, and wounded several crew members.

RPGs were a main tool used by the FMLN's guerrilla forces in the Salvadoran Civil War. For example, during the June 19, 1986, overrun of the San Miguel Army base, FMLN sappers dressed only in black shorts, their faces blacked out with grease, sneaked through barbed wire at night, avoiding the searchlights, they made it to within firing range of the outer wall. Using RPGs to initiate the attack, they blew through the wall and killed a number of Salvadorean soldiers. They eliminated the outermost sentries and searchlights with the rockets, then made it into the inner wall, which they also punched through. They were then able to create mayhem as their comrades attacked from the outside.

During the First (1994–1996) and Second Chechen Wars (1999–2009), Chechen rebels used RPGs to attack Russian tanks from basements and high rooftops. This tactic was effective because tank main guns could not be depressed or raised far enough to return fire, in addition, armor on the very top and bottom of tanks is usually the weakest. Russian forces had to rely on artillery suppression, good crew gunners and infantry screens to prevent such attacks. Tank columns were eventually protected by attached self-propelled anti-aircraft guns (ZSU-23-4 Shilka, 9K22 Tunguska) used in the ground role to suppress and destroy Chechen ambushes. Chechen fighters formed independent "cells" that worked together to destroy a specific Russian armored target. Each cell contained small arms and some form of RPG (RPG-7V or RPG-18, for example). The small arms were used to button the tank up and keep any infantry occupied, while the RPG gunner struck at the tank. While doing so, other teams would attempt to fire at the target in order to overwhelm the Russians' ability to effectively counter the attack. To further increase the chance of success, the teams took up positions at different elevations where possible. Firing from the third and higher floors allowed good shots at the weakest armor (the top). When the Russians began moving in tanks fitted with explosive reactive armor (ERA), the Chechens had to adapt their tactics, because the RPGs they had access to were unlikely to result in the destruction of the tank.

Using RPGs as improvised anti-aircraft batteries has proved successful in Somalia, Afghanistan, and Chechnya. Helicopters are typically ambushed as they land, take off or hover. In Afghanistan, the Mujahideen often modified RPGs for use against Soviet helicopters by adding a curved pipe to the rear of the launcher tube, which diverted the backblast, allowing the RPG to be fired upward at aircraft from a prone position. This made the operator less visible prior to firing and decreased the risk of injury from hot exhaust gases. The Mujahideen also utilized the 4.5-second timer on RPG rounds to make the weapon function as part of a flak battery, using multiple launchers to increase hit probabilities. At the time, Soviet helicopters countered the threat from RPGs at landing zones by first clearing them with anti-personnel saturation fire. The Soviets also varied the number of accompanying helicopters (two or three) in an effort to upset Afghan force estimations and preparation. In response, the Mujahideen prepared dug-in firing positions with top cover, and again, Soviet forces altered their tactics by using air-dropped thermobaric fuel-air bombs on such landing zones. As the U.S.-supplied Stinger surface-to-air missiles became available to them, the Afghans abandoned RPG attacks as the smart missiles proved especially efficient in the destruction of unarmed Soviet transport helicopters, such as Mil Mi-17. In Somalia, both of the UH-60 Black Hawk helicopters lost by U.S. forces during the Battle of Mogadishu in 1993 were downed by RPG-7s.

== See also ==
- Bazooka
- Commando mortar
- Grenade launcher
- MANPATS
- Panzerfaust 3
- Rifle grenade
- Shoulder-fired missile
- Rocket-assisted projectile
