= PBK-500U Drel =

Russian guided cluster glide bomb

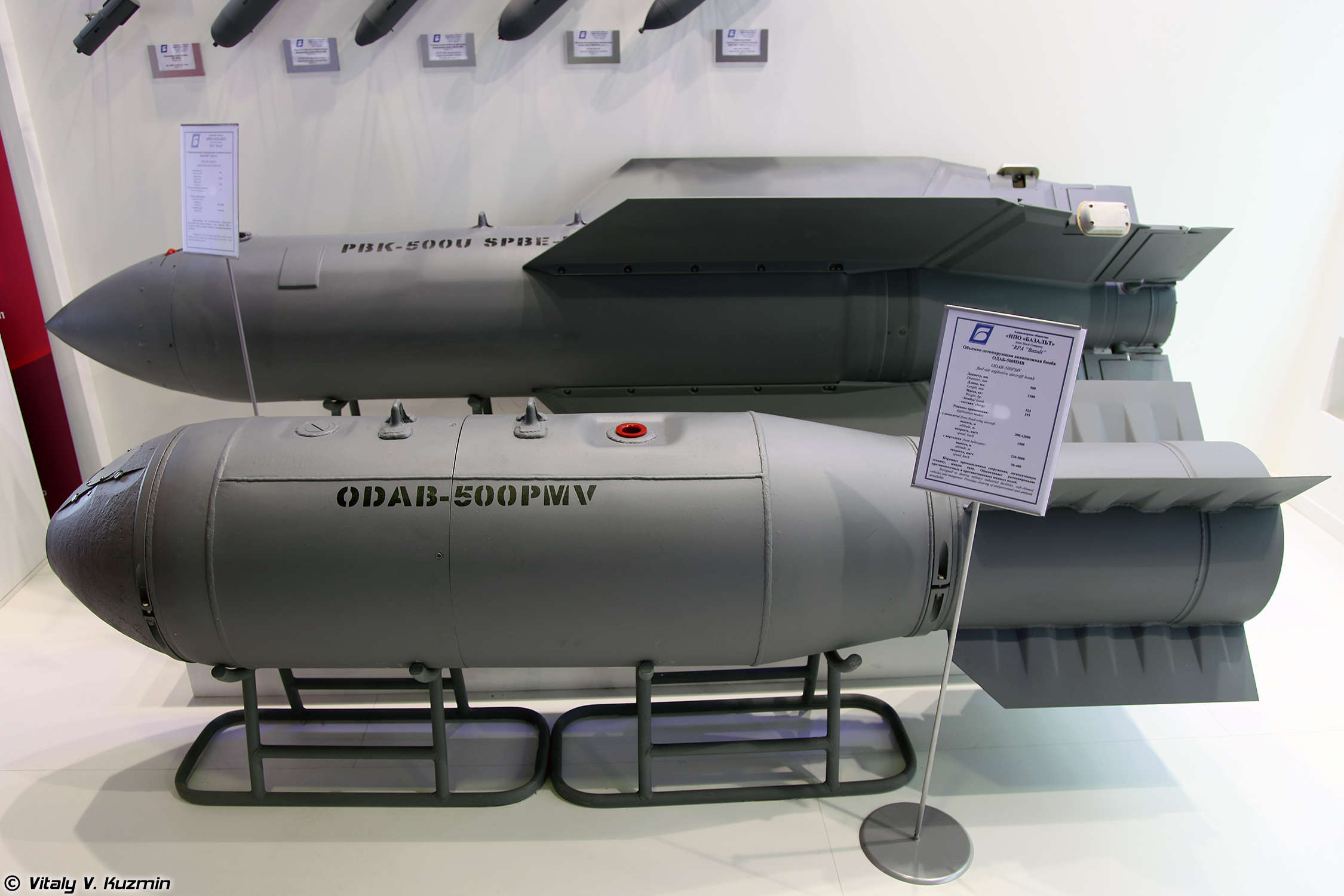
- PBK-500U SPBE-K cluster bomb and ODAB-500PMV bomb
- Type: Guided glide bomb
- Place of origin: Russian Federation

Service history
- In service: 2024–present
- Used by: See Users

Production history
- Designer: NPO Bazalt
- Designed: 2016
- Manufacturer: NPO Bazalt
- Produced: 2024 (planned)
- Variants: See Variants

Specifications
- Mass: 540 kg
- Effective firing range: 30–50 km
- Maximum firing range: Up to 50 km
- Flight altitude: 14 km
- Guidance system: Inertial guidance/GLONASS
- Launch platform: Aircraft

The PBK-500U Drel (Russian: Дрель, lit. "drill") is an inertial and GLONASS-guided cluster glide bomb developed by the Russian Federation, designed to destroy enemy armored vehicles and buildings. Drel is equipped with friend or foe identification system and electronic countermeasures making it resistant to jamming and radar detection and is being introduced to the Russian military in 2024.

== Parameters ==
- Altitude: 14 km
- Range: 30–50 km
- Weight: 540 kg

== Munitions ==
- 15 self-targeting anti-tank SPBE-K submunitions with a twin-band (3–5 μm and 8–14 μm) infrared seeker and a millimetre-wavelength radar seeker with an identification of friend-or-foe (IFF) system
- Other types of munitions are under development

== Operators ==
Russia
