= Denel FT5 =

FT5
- Type: Anti-tank rocket launcher
- Place of origin: South Africa

Service history
- In service: 1989–present
- Used by: South African Army

Production history
- Manufacturer: Somchem, a division of Denel (Pty) Limited, (Now Rheinmetall Denel Munition)
- Produced: 1988 until mid-2000s

Specifications
- Mass: 5.9 kg (13 lb) unloaded 11.3 kg (25 lb) loaded
- Length: 1.05 m (41 in) unloaded 1.618 m (63.7 in) loaded
- Crew: 1
- Calibre: 99 mm (Launcher)
- Muzzle velocity: 275 metres per second (900 ft/s)
- Effective firing range: 400 metres (440 yd)
- Maximum firing range: 600 m
- Feed system: Detachable single-rocket casing
- Sights: Standard: 4× occluded eye battle sight or a passive infrared night sight.

The FT5 is a shoulder-launched, unguided and portable anti-tank rocket weapon. The weapon was built in South Africa by Somchem, a division of Denel based in Somerset West, now Rheinmetall Denel Munition. The weapon was designed with the primary function to provide soldiers with a weapon capable of destroying armoured fighting vehicles and modern main battle tanks. The weapon also has a secondary function of destroying bunkers and other fortifications.

== Service history ==
The FT5 system (launcher, ammunition and logistics support) entered service with the South African Army in 1989, to replace the LRAC F1 as the army's primary section man-portable anti-armour weapon system, augmented by the RPG-7 rocket launcher.

Since 2007 the weapons have been placed in reserve as its ammunition was considered to be too expensive to fire during live-fire exercises and ammunition in storage was time expired.

== Design ==
The FT5 weapon, based on the French LRAC-F1, consists of a reusable launcher, a permanently attached optical sight and a rocket that is pre-packaged in a disposable launch canister. To fire the weapon, the canister (containing the projectile) is attached to the rear-end of the launch tube.

The launcher is a filament-wound composite, smooth bore cylinder with an inner wear-resistant lining. The launcher's tube also has front and rear hand-grips, a padded shoulder rest, an electronic firing mechanism and safety mechanisms. It also features an extendible bipod that is stored within its frontal hand grip. The launcher can fire over 200 rockets and the firing mechanism's batteries have a shelf life of 10 years.

The system's sight features 4× magnification, an 8-degree field of view and a lead-compensating reticle pattern. The reticle pattern determines accurate firing of up to 400 metres and can predict the correct lead angle for a moving target.

== Projectiles ==
92 mm High Explosive Anti-Tank anti-armour warhead
A high-explosive anti-tank warhead capable of penetrating 680 mm of rolled homogeneous armour. Warhead uses a stand-off probe, which is located on the ogive of the projectile, to penetrate the armour.

95 mm High Explosive Anti-Tank anti-armour warhead
An upgraded warhead capable of penetrating 710 mm of rolled homogeneous armour. It is less expensive to produce than the 92 mm warhead.

94 mm High Explosive Multi-Purpose warhead
For use against bunkers, buildings, enemy personnel in the open and light armour. This Warhead contains a hardened steel penetrator, which is filled with explosives, and detonates after a slight delay. It can penetrate 300 mm of reinforced concrete, 1500 mm of wood-lined earth fortifications and 15–20 mm of steel armour.

95 mm High-explosive anti-tank Reactive Armour warhead
A tandem hollow charge warhead capable of penetrating explosive reactive armour. The warhead possesses a small shaped charge at the end of a stand-off spike. It can penetrate 630 mm of rolled homogeneous armour after explosive reactive armour.

== Specifications ==
- Length: 1.05 m unloaded, 1.618 m loaded
- Weight: 5.9 kg unloaded, 11.3 kg loaded
- Bore diameter: 99 mm
- Effective range: 40–400 m
- Maximum range: 600 m
- Warhead arming distance: 20–40 m
- Predicted shelf life: 10 years
- Muzzle velocity: 275 m/s
- Dispersion: 1.5 × 1.5 m at 400 m

== Users ==
- (South Africa) South African Army – in reserve/storage since 2007.
