= RPG-28 =

Disposable Anti-tank rocket launcher

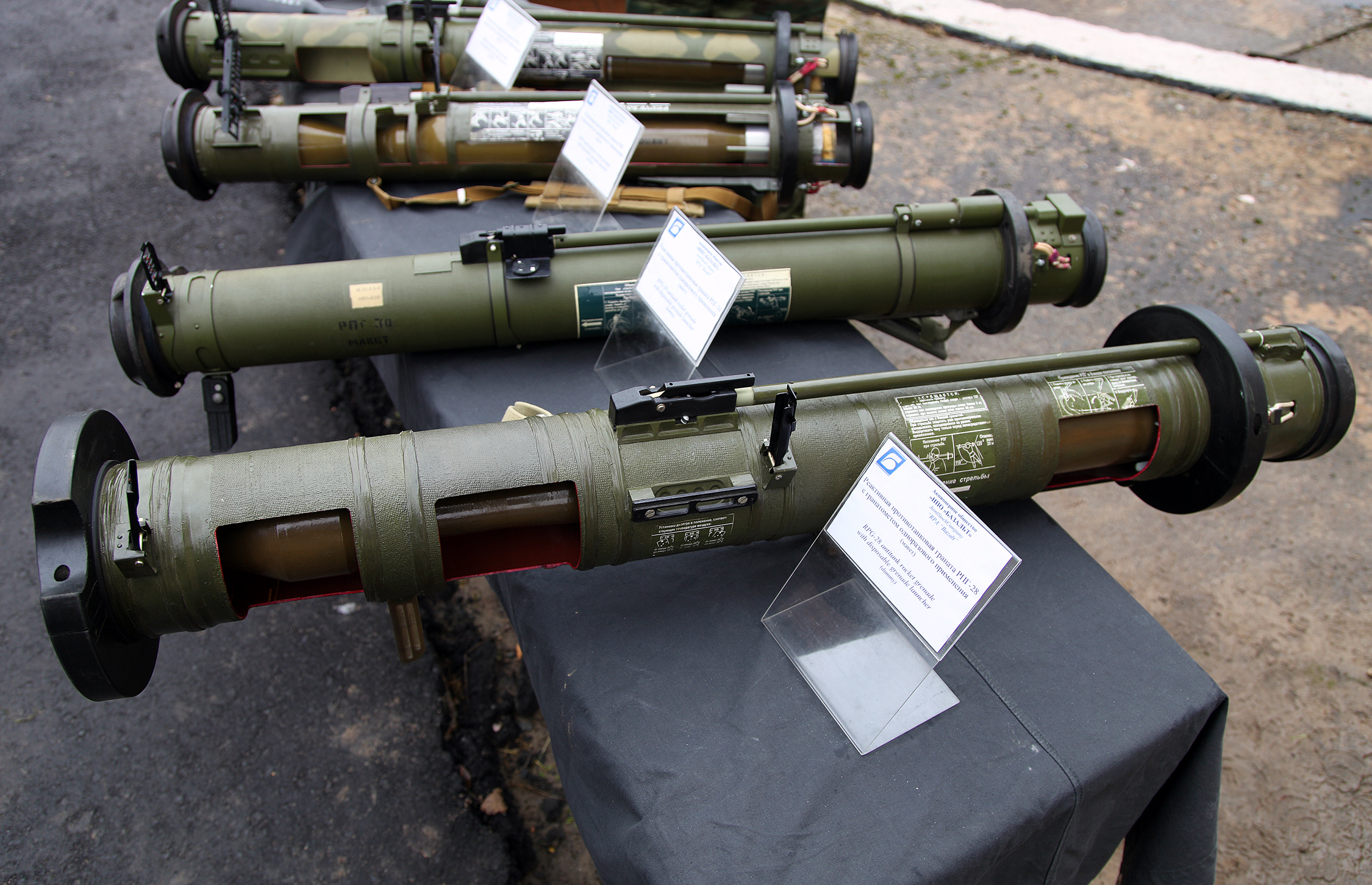
- An RPG-28 on display at Interpolitex 2016
- Type: Disposable Anti-tank rocket launcher
- Place of origin: Russia

Service history
- In service: December 2011
- Wars: 2022 Russian invasion of Ukraine

Production history
- Designer: Bazalt
- Designed: 2000s
- Manufacturer: Bazalt
- Produced: 2008

Specifications
- Mass: 12 kg (projectile); 13.5 kg (loaded)
- Length: 1200 mm
- Caliber: 125 mm
- Action: 900 mm: RHA after ERA; 2500mm: Reinforced concrete 3000 mm: Brick
- Muzzle velocity: 250 m/s
- Effective firing range: 300 m
- Sights: Iron sights or telescopic sight

The RPG-28 (Russian: РПГ-28), also known as the Klyukva (Russian: Клюква, lit. 'Cranberry') is a Russian handheld anti-tank rocket launcher.

== History ==
The RPG-28 was unveiled in 2007 at IDEX Abu Dhabi by the State Research and Production Enterprise, Bazalt as a modern anti-tank rocket launcher designed to defeat modern and future tanks with advanced reactive and composite armour as well as fortified infantry.

It was offered for export in 2008. Officially adopted by the Russian Government in December 2011.

The RPG-28 is reportedly used by Russian soldiers in the Russian invasion of Ukraine.

== Design ==
The RPG-28 shares a close resemblance with the RPG-27 in that it is a portable, disposable anti-tank rocket launcher with a single shot capacity. It has a larger diameter round than the RPG-27 which enables the RPG-28 to achieve higher armour penetration performance.

The RPG-28 round is a 125 mm tandem shaped charge with a weight of 8.5 kg and a range of 300 meters. The round has a stated penetration capability in excess of 1000 mm RHA (after ERA) and 3000 mm of brick. Loaded weight is 13.5 kg.

== Users ==
- Russia
