= RPG-30 =

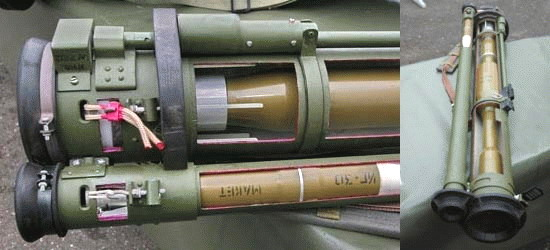
- RPG-30 "Hook"
- Type: Disposable Rocket-propelled grenade
- Place of origin: Russia

Service history
- In service: 2012
- Wars: Russo-Ukrainian war

Production history
- Designer: Bazalt
- Designed: 2008
- Manufacturer: Bazalt
- Produced: 2013

Specifications
- Mass: 10.3 kg
- Caliber: 105 mm
- Action: 650 mm: Rolled homogeneous armor after active and dynamic protection 1,500 mm: Reinforced concrete 2,000 mm: Brick
- Muzzle velocity: 120 m/s
- Effective firing range: 200 m

The RPG-30 (Russian: РПГ-30), also known as the "Kryuk" (Russian: Крюк, lit. 'Hook'), is a Russian hand-held disposable anti-tank grenade launcher.

== History ==
The RPG-30 was unveiled in 2008 by the State Research and Production Enterprise, Bazalt, as a modern anti-tank grenade launcher designed to address the challenge of reactive armor and active protection systems (APS) on tanks.

Active protection systems such as ARENA-E, Drozd and Trophy defeat anti-armor munitions by destroying them before they reach their target.

The RPG-30 cleared its testing program and entered service in 2012–2013 and was immediately put on the Pentagon's list of "asymmetrical threats to the US armed forces."

== Design ==
The RPG-30, like the RPG-27, is a man-portable, disposable anti-tank rocket launcher with a single shot capacity. Unlike the RPG-27 however, there is a smaller diameter precursor round in a side tube, in addition to the main round in the main tube.

The precursor round is fired shortly before the main round and acts as a decoy, tricking the target's active protection system (APS) into engaging it. The APS is not ready to engage again until 0.2–0.4 seconds later, allowing the main round time to hit the target.

The PG-30 is the main round of the RPG-30. The round is a 105 mm tandem shaped charge with a mass of 10.3 kg (22.7 lb) and has a range of 200 meters and a stated penetration capability in excess of 600 mm (24-in) of rolled homogeneous armor (RHA), 1,500 mm of reinforced concrete, 2,000 mm of brick and 3,700 mm of soil.

=== Defenses ===
In 2012 Israel Defense reported that the Rafael military-industrial corporation has developed a defense system, "Trench Coat", against the RPG-30, to supplement the existing Trophy.

It consists of a 360-degree radar that detects all threats and launches 17 projectiles, of which one should strike the incoming missile.

== Variants ==
Iran and Vietnam have been producing copies of the RPG-30.

Per publicized information, the Vietnamese unlicensed production is designated THCT-105TM2, utilizing ĐTC-105TM2 rounds with similar performance to the original Russian production, despite being slightly heavier.

== Users ==
- Iran
- Russian Federation
- Syria
- Ukraine: Known to be used by Georgian Legion.
- Vietnam - local derivative.

=== Non-State Actors ===
- (Afghanistan) Taliban militants used during 2013-2015
