= NPO Bazalt =

Russian weapons manufacturing company

Bazalt
- Type: Joint Stock Company
- Industry: Defense
- Founded: 1916
- Headquarters: Moscow, Russia
- Products: Bombs, Glide bombs, Precision-guided munitions, Rocket-propelled grenade launchers, (RPG), Anti-tank weapons
- Parent: Techmash (Rostec)
- Website: bazalt.ru

NPO Bazalt (Russian: НПО «Базальт») is a weapons manufacturing company in Russia that took over (or continued) the production of weapons such as the RPG-7 after the collapse of the Soviet Union. NPO Bazalt manufactures the RPG-7V2 and the RPG-29. AO NPO Bazalt is included in the state corporation Rostec.

== History ==
Bazalt was founded in 1916. Over its history, the company created 700 models of ammunition for military use.

Bazalt is one of the leading designers and developers of many variants of aircraft bombs, anti-tank and anti-saboteur marine grenade launcher complexes, mortar shells of many variants, and calibers and other kinds of ammunition. The company's most famous product is the RPG-7, developed in the 1960s and used by the armies of over 40 countries, with over one million having been built by the company or on license by 2004.

Ammunition developed by Bazalt is used by the armed forces of over 80 countries in the world. Licenses for production of 61 types of ammunition were transferred to 11 countries in the world.

Since December 2012, Bazalt is a subsidiary of Techmash, a Rostec company.

Under EO 13661, the Obama administration on July 16, 2014, imposed sanctions on NPO Bazalt through the US Department of Treasury's Office of Foreign Assets Control (OFAC) by adding NPO Bazalt and other entities to the Specially Designated Nationals List (SDN) in retaliation for the ongoing Russo-Ukrainian War.

On 12 September 2014 the EU published sanctions against NPO Bazalt, amongst other entities, under Council Decisions 2014/658/CFSP and 2014/659/CFSP. The particular goods or services list of the Council was subsequently modified several times:

- COUNCIL DECISION (CFSP) 2022/327 of 25 February 2022 amending Regulation (EU) No 833/2014
- COUNCIL REGULATION (EU) 2022/2474 of 16 December 2022 amending Decision 2014/512/CFSP

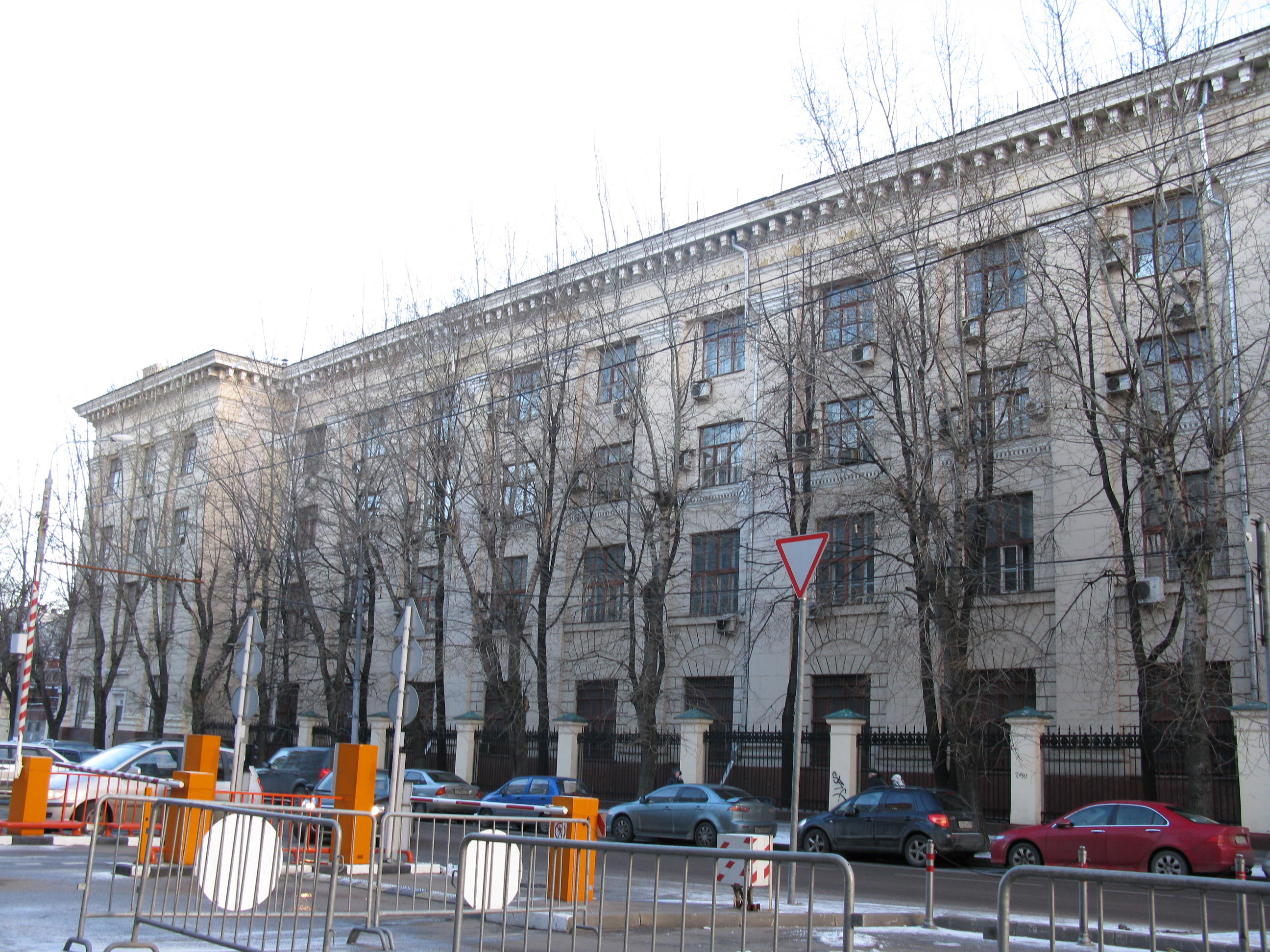
The company's production building is located on Veliaminovskaya Street, Moscow.

The government of Ukraine lists Switzerland as an additional sanctioned of NPO Bazalt.

== Production ==
- RPG-7
- RPG-16
- RPG-18
- RPG-22
- RPG-26
- RPG-27
- RPG-28
- RPG-29
- RPG-30
- RPG-32
- PG-7VR
- PBK-500U Drel: Glide cluster bomb.

== Areas of activity ==
- Aviation bomb armament
  - high-explosive and high-explosive fragmentation aerial bombs
  - concrete bombs
  - volumetric detonating bombs
  - incendiary bombs and tanks
  - means of identification, designation and destruction of submarines
  - auxiliary, special and training bombs
  - small-sized targets
- Melee weapons
  - grenade launchers
  - hand grenades
- Mortar and shell armament
  - mortar rounds
  - shells for artillery
- Marine anti-sabotage grenade launchers
- Aviation fire extinguishing agent ASP-500

== Management ==
- Kulakov Nikolai Timofeevich
- Burakov Peter Gerasimovich
- Bunin Sergey Alekseevich
- Kupchikhin Alexey Ivanovich
- Rukazenkov Dmitry Dmitrievich
- Kaverin Oleg Konstantinovich
- Anatoly Stepanovich Obukhov (1982-2000)
- Korenkov Vladimir Vladimirovich (2000-May 2009)
- Alexander Leonidovich Rybas (2009-June 2012)
- Porkhachev Vladimir Anatolyevich (June 2012-November 2019)
- Kashirskikh Andrey Vasilyevich (2019-2022)
- Sergey Viktorovich Zhuikov (2022-May 2023)
- Porkhachev Nikolay Vladimirovich (May 2023-present)

== See also ==
- Norinco
