= Breda Folgore =

Folgore
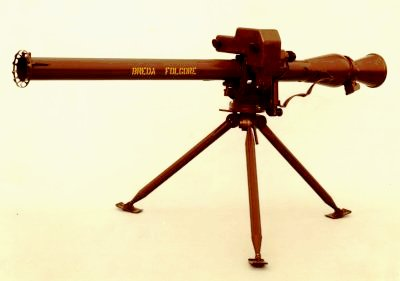
- Folgore recoilless rifle on the tripod.
- Type: Recoilless antitank weapon
- Place of origin: Italy

Service history
- Used by: Italy; Kurdistan

Production history
- Designed: 1974
- Manufacturer: Breda Meccanica Bresciana
- Produced: 1986 - 2001
- Variants: Shoulder or tripod fired

Specifications
- Mass: 27 kg (60 lb)
- Length: 1.85 m (6 ft 1 in)
- Crew: 2
- Cartridge: 80 mm (3.1 in) HEAT
- Rate of fire: 1 round per 15 seconds
- Muzzle velocity: 385 m/s (1,260 ft/s)
- Maximum firing range: 1,000 m (1,100 yd)
- Sights: 5x Optical rangefinder

External images
- Breda FOLGORE
- Folgore Side View
- Folgore Rear View
- Folgore - bipod
- Folgore - tripod
- Folgore - ammunition
- Folgore - projectile

The Folgore (Thunderbolt) is an Italian 80 mm recoilless anti-tank weapon developed and manufactured by Breda Meccanica Bresciana. It weighs 18.9 kilograms (with bipod) and 25.6 kilograms (with tripod). Development of the Folgore started in 1974 and it was adopted by the Italian Army in 1986. Over 800 Folgores had been produced by 2001.

== Description ==
The Folgore's launcher is a recoilless rifle that fires a boost-after-launch rocket-assisted projectile. It consists of a long, reusable launch tube constructed of high strength nickel-cobalt-steel. The use of nickel-cobalt-steel not only keeps the weight at a reasonable level, but also enables the firing of projectiles at a much higher velocity than other weapons previously in its class. To load the Folgore, the nozzle clamp has to be released and tilted to the side to insert the ammunition. The cartridge case is perforated with holes along its sides to allow gases to escape to the back and out of the nozzle on firing to achieve a recoilless effect. One kilogram of propellant in the cartridge case is used to fire the projectile. After the projectile exits the muzzle, six fins snap into place. The fins are canted slightly to impart spin. After the projectile has coasted a safe distance a rocket motor ignites, boosting the projectile from 385 m/s to 500 m/s, giving the projectile an almost flat trajectory to 500 m.

== Operation ==
The Folgore can be operated in two configurations. The first is as a shoulder fired weapon, where it has a maximum effective range of 500 meters. The other and more commonly used configuration when the Folgore began production in the 1980s is with the weapon mounted on a bipod or tripod with a coincidence type of range finder by Officine Galileo, which imposes a blinking light dot in the gunners sight, showing the gunner the time of flight and the aim point and the true impact point, similar to the type developed for the early Swedish Carl Gustav. Today there are many laser rangefinders offered by various firms for even greater accuracy at longer ranges. This configuration requires a two-man crew and allows effective fire at ranges up to 1,000 meters. The weapon is fitted with a 5x scope, a night vision sight can also be mounted.

The Folgore is a very accurate weapon. A skilled team can fire one round every 15 seconds, but this rate of fire can only be maintained for two minutes before overheating the tube.

== Ammunition ==
The HEAT round has a muzzle velocity of 385 m/s and reaches a maximum velocity of 500 m/s with its rocket propulsion. The HEAT rocket has a flight time of only three seconds to a range of 1,000 meters. Maximum trajectory height is 2.2 meters at 500 meters and less than three meters at 700 meters. The accuracy and high velocity give the Folgore a long effective range in comparison to similar systems. The HEAT warhead is filled with composition-B.

The 5.2-kilogram HEAT round penetrates over 450 mm of RHA (rolled homogeneous armor), which is not enough to defeat the frontal armor of modern tanks or most ERA (explosive reactive armor)-protected armored surfaces. It is, however, useful as an assault support weapon against bunkers and sandbag emplacements and any armored vehicle other than a main battle tank.

== Users ==
- Italy
- Kurdistan Region

== Sources ==
- (Norris) Anti-tank Weapons, John Norris, London: Brasseys, 1996.
- Jane's Weapon Systems 1984-85
- International Institute for Strategic Studies (February 2016). The Military Balance 2016. Vol. 116. Routlegde. ISBN 978-1-85743-835-2.
