= RPG-32 =

Russian-designed rocket-propelled grenade

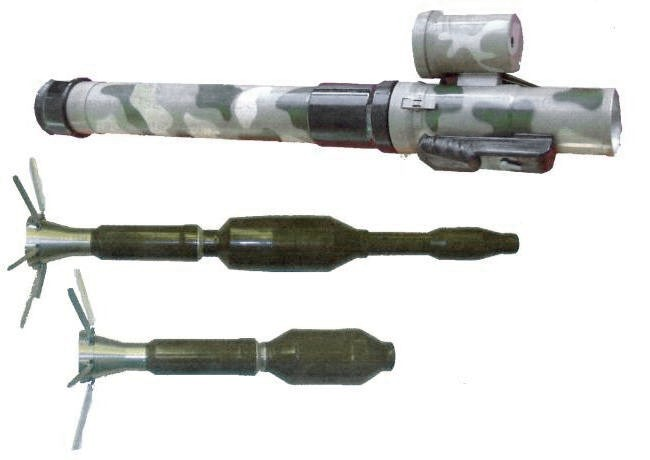
- Type: Rocket-propelled grenade
- Place of origin: Russia; Jordan

Service history
- In service: 2012–present
- Used by: See users
- Wars: Syrian Civil War; Iraqi Civil War (2014–2017); War in Afghanistan; Yemeni Civil War (2015–present); Russo-Ukrainian War: Russo-Ukrainian war (2022–present)

Production history
- Designer: Bazalt
- Designed: Between 2005 and 2012
- Manufacturer: JADARA under License.
- Produced: 2012–present

Specifications
- Mass: 3 kg unloaded 10 kg loaded with 105 mm rocket 6 kg loaded with 72 mm rocket
- Length: 1,200 mm (complete with 105 mm launch container); 900 mm (complete with 72 mm launch container)
- Shell: PG-32V tandem HEAT; TBG-32V thermobaric
- Caliber: 105 mm barrel 72/105 mm warheads
- Muzzle velocity: 140 m/s
- Effective firing range: 350 m
- Maximum firing range: 700 m
- Sights: Collimator sight
- Blast yield: 750 mm (30 in) RHA; 650 mm (26 in) RHA after ERA with 105 mm PG-32V tandem HEAT rocket

The RPG-32 Barkas (Russian: РПГ-32) is a reusable Russian shoulder-launched, unguided anti-tank rocket system.

== Development ==
It was developed by Bazalt between 2005 and 2007, under contract and at the request of Jordan.

The first RPG-32 'Nashshab' grenade launchers were to be delivered to Jordan from Russia in 2008, and it was planned that the RPG-32 and its ammunition would be mass-produced in Jordan under license at the JADARA factory.

On 30 May 2013, Rostec chief executive officer (CEO) Sergey Chemezov and King Abdullah II opened a production facility for the Russian RPG-32 in Jordan.

== Design ==
The RPG-32 was designed and developed by state-owned unitary enterprise (FGUP) "Bazalt" weapon manufacturing company.

The RPG-32 is also assembled in Jordan from Russian-made kits from Bazalt under the name "RPG Nashab" (Arabic: ار بي جي نشاب).

== Variants ==
=== Nashshab ===
In February 2015, Jordanian company Jadara Equipment & Defence Systems revealed they had incorporated the RPG-32 into a quad-launcher remote weapon station (RWS).

The "Nashshab" (Archer) system comes in two versions.

==== Quad-1 ====
Tripod-mounted meant to defend fixed positions, with tubes arranged in a 2×2 configuration and controlled either remotely or through a wire up to 300 m away.

==== Quad-2 ====
Vehicle mounted for use against infantry, vehicles, and pillboxes in urban terrain, with tubes arranged in a 4×1 configuration and operated from a control unit inside the vehicle.

The stations have day/night sights with rangefinding and automatic targets acquisition capabilities.

=== Raptor ===
In November 2022, Jadara Equipment & Defence Systems announced they would begin production of the Raptor rocket launcher later that year.

The Raptor is a development of the Nashshab RPG-32 using a 107 mm rocket. It uses the same GS-2R reusable sighting system with a laser rangefinder to calculate ballistic trajectories for better accuracy, giving it an effective range of 500 m.

The warhead can penetrate 500 mm rolled homogeneous armor (RHA) after explosive reactive armour (ERA) and the complete system weighs 14 kg (31 lb).

Unlike the Nashshab, which was a joint development with Russia, the Raptor will be made in Jordan entirely.

== Combat history ==
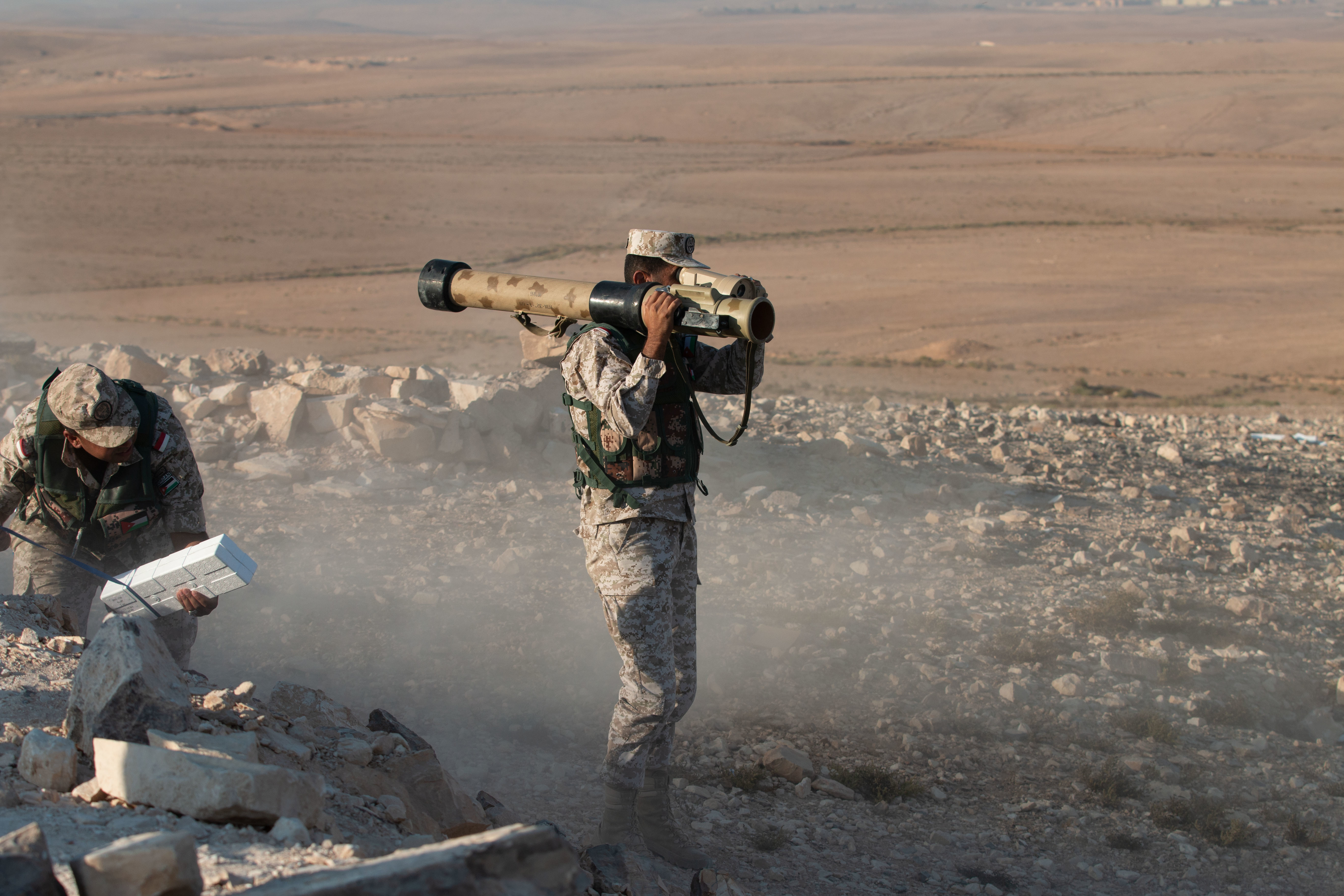
Jordanian soldier firing an RPG-32

In March 2016, video was released of Ansar al-Sharia (Yemen) using the RPG-32 against Houthi forces during the Yemeni Civil War.

It is unknown how the terrorist group could have acquired such a modern and advanced weapon system, but it is likely they were initially supplied to Yemeni loyalist forces by the user nations of Jordan or the UAE, part of the Saudi Arabian-led intervention in Yemen, then captured by militants.

The RPG-32 has also been seen in use by Kurdish Peshmerga forces in northern Iraq.

== Users ==
- Egypt
- Iraq
- Jordan
- Russia
- Tunisia
- Ukraine
  - Came from Jordan and manufactured through third-party suppliers.
- United Arab Emirates
