= RPG-26 =

Anti-tank rocket launcher

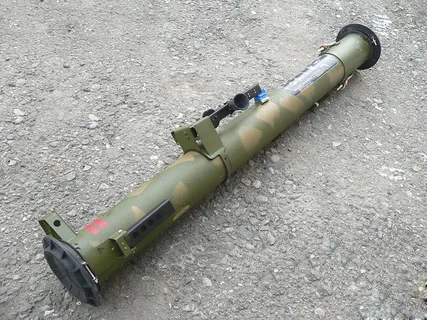
- Type: Disposable anti-tank rocket launcher
- Place of origin: Soviet Union

Service history
- In service: 1985–present
- Wars: Second Chechen War; Syrian Civil War; Russo-Ukrainian War

Production history
- Designer: State Research and Production Enterprise, Bazalt
- Designed: 1980s
- Manufacturer: State Research and Production Enterprise, Bazalt
- Produced: 1985–present
- Variants: RShG-2

Specifications
- Mass: 1.8 kilograms (4.0 lb) (projectile); 2.9 kilograms (6.4 lb) (loaded)
- Length: 77 centimetres (30 in)
- Caliber: 72.5 millimetres (2.85 in)
- Action: 440 mm: RHA; 1000 mm: Reinforced concrete; 1500 mm: Brickwork; 2400 mm: Log and earth
- Muzzle velocity: 144 m/s (470 ft/s)
- Effective firing range: 250 m (270 yd)
- Sights: Iron sights

The RPG-26 Aglen is a disposable anti-tank rocket-propelled grenade (RPG) launcher developed by the Soviet Union.

== Design ==
The RPG-26 fires a one-stage rocket with jack-knife fins, which unfold after launch.

The rocket carries a 72.5-millimetre (2.85 in) diameter high-explosive anti-tank (HEAT) single shaped charge warhead able to penetrate 440 millimetres (17 in) of armour, 1 metre (3 ft 3 in) of reinforced concrete or 1.5 metres (4 ft 11 in) of brickwork.

The RPG-26 has a maximum effective range of around 250 metres (820 ft). Despite being similar in caliber to the RPG-22, the rocket features a slightly heavier and more powerful HEAT warhead, as well as a more powerful rocket engine.

== Variants ==
=== RShG-2 ===
The RShG-2 (Russian: Реактивная Штурмовая Граната, romanized: Reaktivnaya Shturmovaya Granata, lit. 'Rocket-propelled Assault Grenade') is a RPG-26 variant with thermobaric warhead.

It is also called the Aglen-2 (Russian: Аглень-2).

The RShG-2 is heavier than the RPG-26 at 3.5 kilograms (7.7 lb) and has a reduced direct fire range of 115 metres (377 ft), intended for use against infantry and structures rather than armoured vehicles.

The warhead contains 1.16 kilograms (2.6 lb) of thermobaric mixture, with an explosive yield roughly equal to that of 3 kilograms (6.6 lb) of trinitrotoluene (TNT).

The solid rocket booster of the warhead was taken from the RPG-26 and the fuse taken from the TBG-7 warhead used by the RPG-7. The warhead has a stated penetration ability of 300 millimetres (12 in) of concrete and 500 millimetres (20 in) of brickwork.

=== PDM-1 ===
Georgian variant made by STC Delta.

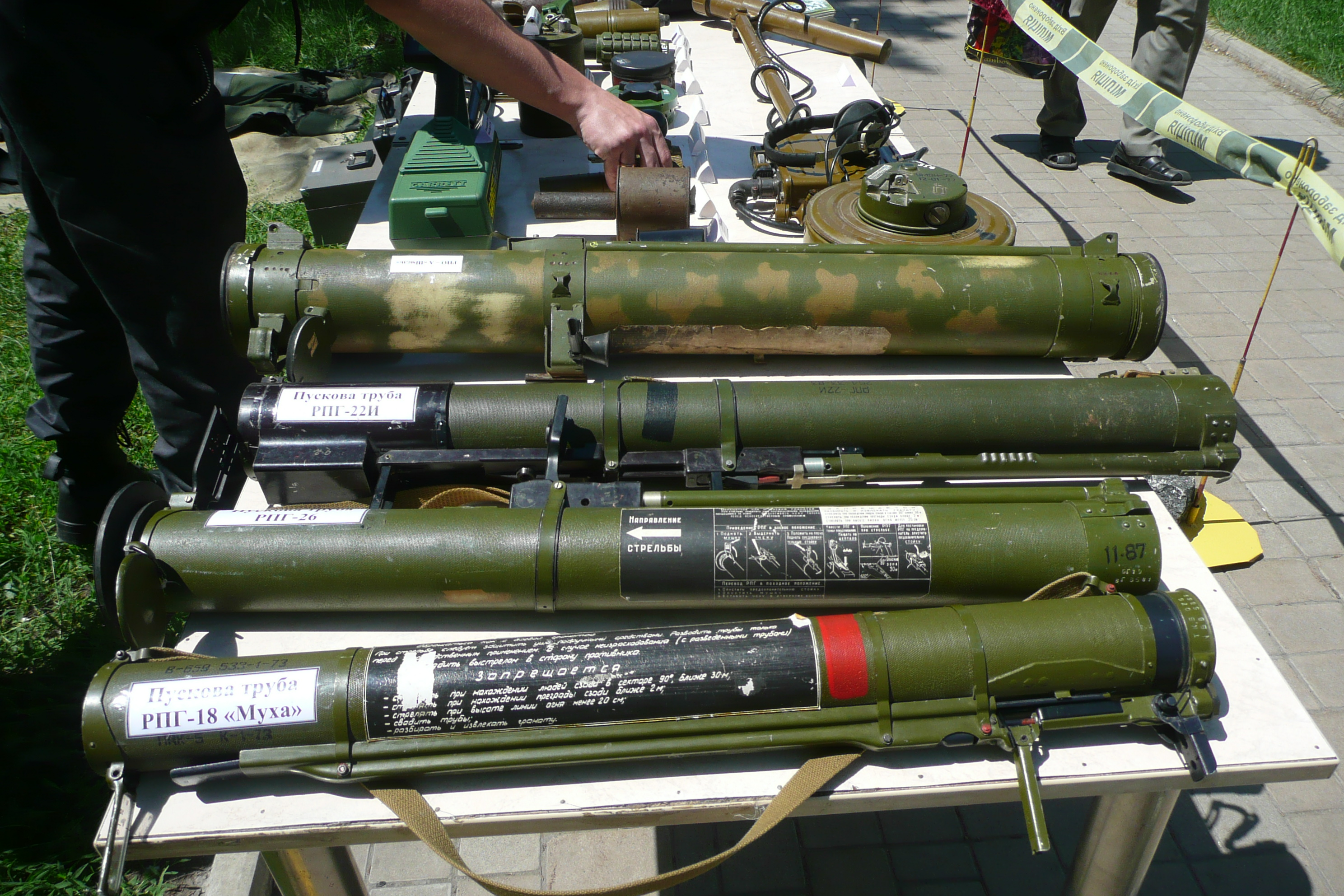
RPG-26 (second from bottom) with comparable Soviet–Russian rocket launchers

== Operators ==
=== Current operators ===
- Armenia
- Azerbaijan
- Belarus
- China
  - RShG-2 variant
- Georgia
- Houthis
- Jordan
  - 3,000 in possession
- Russia - Used during the Russo-Ukrainian War and the Second Chechen War
- Syria
- Transnistria
- Venezuela
  - RShG-2 variant

=== Former operators ===
- Soviet Union
