= RPG-27 =

Soviet disposable rocket launcher

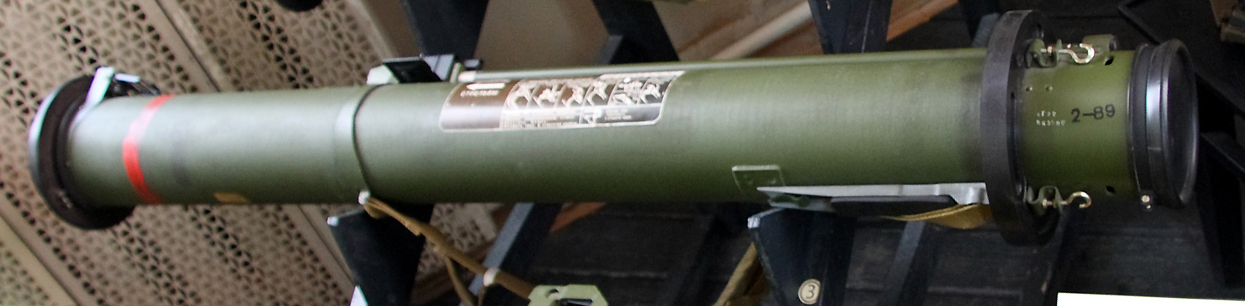
- A RPG-27 rocket launcher on display at the Tula State Museum of Weapons
- Type: Disposable rocket launcher
- Place of origin: Soviet Union, Russia

Service history
- In service: 1989–present
- Used by: See Operators
- Wars: War in Donbas; Syrian Civil War

Production history
- Designer: State Research and Production Enterprise, Bazalt
- Designed: 1980s
- Manufacturer: State Research and Production Enterprise, Bazalt
- Produced: 1989
- Variants: RShG-1; RMG

Specifications
- Mass: 7.6 kg (17 lb)
- Length: 1,155 mm (45.5 in)
- Caliber: 105 mm (4.1 in)
- Action: 750 mm (30 in): RHA; 650 mm (26 in): RHA after ERA; 1.5 m (4.9 ft): reinforced concrete 3.7 m (12 ft): earth
- Muzzle velocity: 120 m/s (390 ft/s)
- Effective firing range: 200 m (660 ft)
- Sights: Iron sights

The RPG-27, also nicknamed as the "Tavolga" (Russian: Таволга, lit. 'Meadow grass'), is a Soviet single shot disposable rocket-propelled grenade (RPG) shoulder-fired missile and rocket launcher, entering service with the Soviet Army in 1989.

== History ==
The RPG-27 Tavolga ('meadow grass') was developed by the State Research and Production Enterprise, Bazalt, as a modern, anti-tank grenade launcher with a one-stage rocket, designed to defeat modern and future tanks with advanced reactive and composite armor, and fortified infantry.

=== Usage ===
On May 1, 2015, members of the Jalisco New Generation Cartel (CJNG) used an RPG-27 to shoot down a Mexican Air Force Eurocopter EC725 Cougar helicopter during an operation targeting cartel leader El Mencho. The rocket hit the tail, causing the helicopter to spin and crash, killing nine personnel on board.

== Description ==
The RPG-27 shares a close resemblance to the prior RPG-26 in that it is a man-portable, disposable anti-tank grenade launcher with a single shot capacity.

The RPG-27 has a larger diameter round than the RPG-26, which enables higher armour penetration.

The RPG-27 fin stabilised round is a 105 mm tandem-charge high-explosive anti-tank (HEAT) warhead with a range of 200 metres (660 ft).

The round has a stated penetration ability in excess of 650 millimetres (26 in) of rolled homogeneous armour (RHA) (after explosive reactive armour (ERA) and 1,500 millimetres (59 in) of brick or concrete and 3.7 metres (12 ft) of earth.

== Variants ==
=== RShG-1 ===
The RShG-1 (Russian: Реактивная Штурмовая Граната-1, romanized: Reaktivnaya Shturmovaya Granata-1, lit. 'Rocket-propelled Assault Grenade-1') Tavolga-1 (Таволга-1) is a variant of RPG-27 with thermobaric warhead.

The RShG-1 is intended to be used against soft skinned and lightly armored vehicles, buildings, military installations and infantry.

The RShG-1 is very similar in operation to the RPG-27. It has a lethal radius of 10 metres (33 ft) and a larger sighting range of 600 metres (2,000 ft). The warhead contains 1.9 kilograms (4.2 lb) of thermobaric mixture, with an explosive yield roughly equal to that of 8 kilograms (18 lb) of TNT. Officially adopted by the Russian Government in December 2011.

=== RMG ===
The RMG (Russian: Реактивная Многоцелевая Граната, romanized: Reaktivnaya Mnogotselevaya Granata, lit. 'Rocket-propelled multi-purpose grenade') rocket launcher was developed by Bazalt in the early 2000s.

The RMG is a smaller, multipurpose variant of the RShG-1 that is optimized as a bunker buster and to defeat light vehicles and infantry in cover. As a result, its penetration performance against tank armor is reduced.

The RMG launcher carries a tandem warhead. The precursor HEAT warhead penetrates armour or other obstacles (reinforced concrete, masonry, etc.). The aerosol produced by the main thermobaric warhead enters the target through the opening created by the precursor charge and combusts, producing high-explosive and incendiary effects.

The launcher and round share the same designation, as is standard for disposable rocket launchers. S. Kh. Irtuganov was the lead designer for the project. It was officially adopted by the Russian Government in December 2011.

== Operators ==
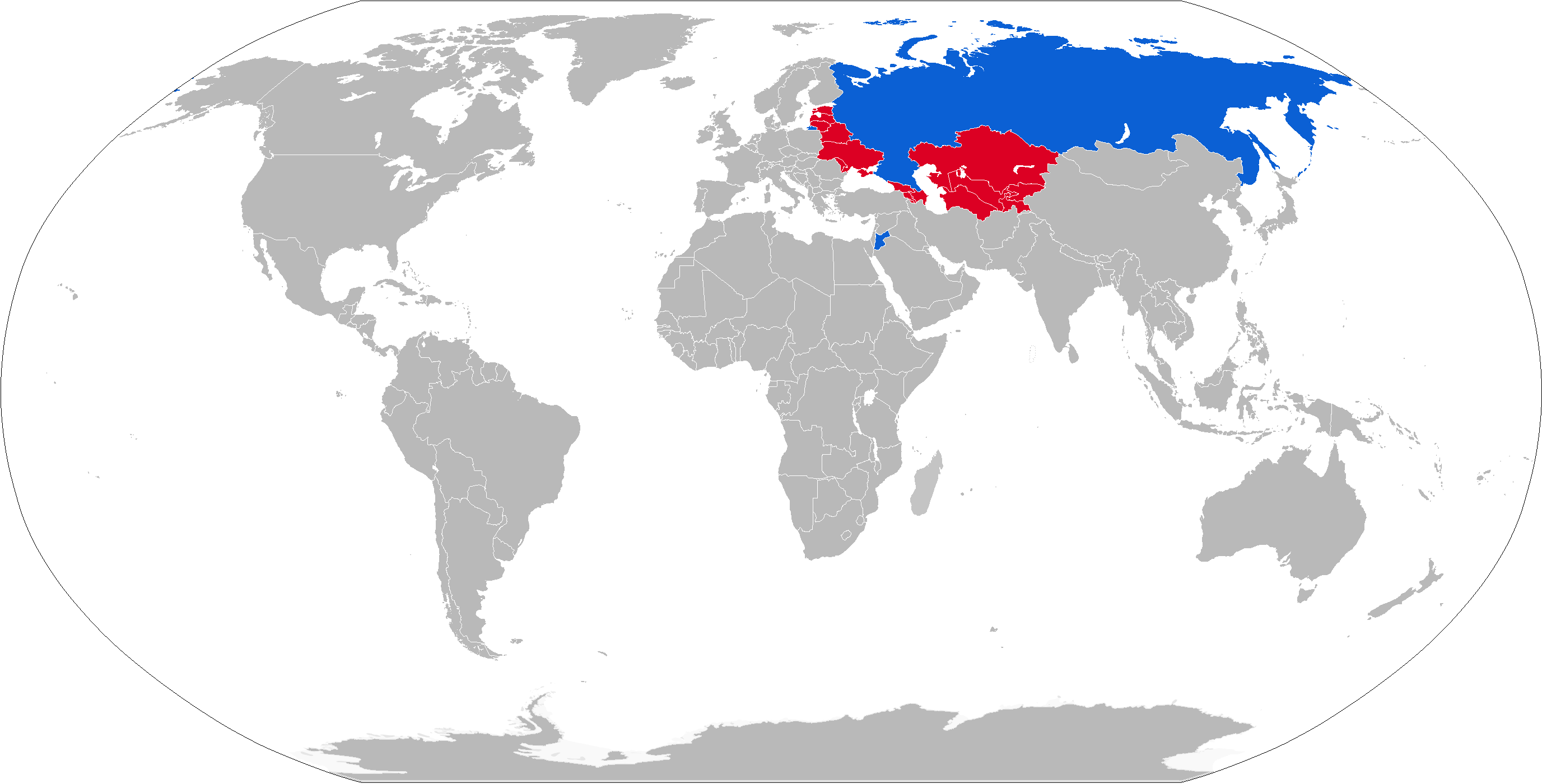
Operators Current Former

=== Current operators ===
- Houthis
- Iran
- Jordan
- Russia
- Syria
- Transnistria

=== Former operators ===
- Soviet Union
