= Rolled homogeneous armour =

Type of armour

Rolled homogeneous armour (RHA) is a type of vehicle armour made of a single steel composition hot-rolled to improve its material characteristics, as opposed to layered or cemented armour. Its first common application was in tanks. After World War II, it began to fall out of use on main battle tanks and other armoured fighting vehicles intended to see front-line combat as new anti-tank weapon technologies were developed which were capable of relatively easily penetrating rolled homogeneous armour plating even of significant thickness.

Today, the term is primarily used as a unit of measurement of the protection offered by armour on a vehicle (often composed of materials that may not actually contain steel, or even contain any metals) in equivalent millimetres of RHA, referring to the thickness of RHA that would provide the same protection. Typically, modern composite armour can provide the same amount of protection with much thinner and lighter construction than its protective equivalence in RHA. Likewise, the term is also used as a unit of measurement of penetration capability of armour-piercing weaponry, in terms of the millimetres of RHA that the weapon system can reliably penetrate.

== Composition ==
Armoured steel must be hard, yet resistant to shock, in order to resist high velocity metal projectiles. Steel with these characteristics is produced by processing cast steel billets of appropriate size and then rolling them into plates of required thickness. Hot rolling homogenizes the grain structure of the steel, changing the crystalline structure of the steel and normalizing it.

RHA is homogeneous because its structure and composition are uniform throughout its thickness. The opposite of homogeneous steel plate is cemented or face-hardened steel plate, where the face of the steel is composed differently from the substrate. The face of the steel, which starts as an RHA plate, is hardened by a heat-treatment process.

== History ==
From the invention of tanks through to the Second World War, tank armour increased in thickness to resist the increasing size and power of anti-tank guns. A tank with sufficient armour could resist the largest anti-tank guns then in use.

RHA was commonly used during this period (combined with other plate alloys and cast steel armour), and the power of anti-tank guns was measured by the thickness of RHA they could penetrate. This standard test has remained in use despite the modern usage of many other types of armour, some of which do not include steel or any other metals.

RHA was in common use as primary armour until after World War II, during which a new generation of anti-tank rounds using shaped charges came into use instead of heavy high-velocity projectiles.

== Current use ==
Since World War II, because of a reduction in effectiveness against new weapons (mainly shaped charges and improved kinetic energy penetrators), RHA has largely been superseded by composite armour, which incorporates air spaces and materials such as ceramics or plastics in addition to steel, and explosive reactive armour.

For the testing and calibration of anti-tank guns, the term rolled homogeneous armour equivalency (RHAe) is used when giving an estimate of either the penetrative capability of a projectile or the protective capability of a type of armour which may or may not be steel. Because of variations in armour shape, quality, material, and case-by-case performance, the usefulness of RHAe in comparing different armour is only approximate.

Currently, most armoured vehicles have their basic structures formed from RHA to lend general strength and toughness.

== Specifications ==
The US army has several standards for rolled homogeneous armour:

- Current use is based on military standard MIL-DTL-12560 by several manufacturers. The typical Brinell Hardness range of MIL-A 12560 is 302-400
  - The MIL-12560K standard actually specifies four classes of hardnesses. The softest class I rates as 260-310. The toughest Class 4 rates as 420-470. (K is the revision number of the standard.)
- MIL-DTL-46177 is an older, now-replaced standard for a high hardness steel RHA. It specifies a harder steel that is nearly identical to AR500 in terms of tensile and yield strength. The Brinell hardness of AR500 is in the 477-534 range. MIL-DTL-46100E specifies a steel of identical hardness.
- MIL-DTL-32332 specifies ultra-hard steel, with Brinell hardness in excess of 570.

A Chinese publication lists 30MnCrNiMo "685" steel as the material used in Chinese rolled armor plates, with a Brinell Hardness of HBW 444-514 (thin) / 429-495 (thick). According to the same publication, older vehicles use a 22SiMn2TiB "616" steel with a hardness of HBS ≤ 219.

== See also ==
- Slat armour
- Sloped armour
- Spaced armour
