= Mk 153 Shoulder-Launched Multipurpose Assault Weapon =

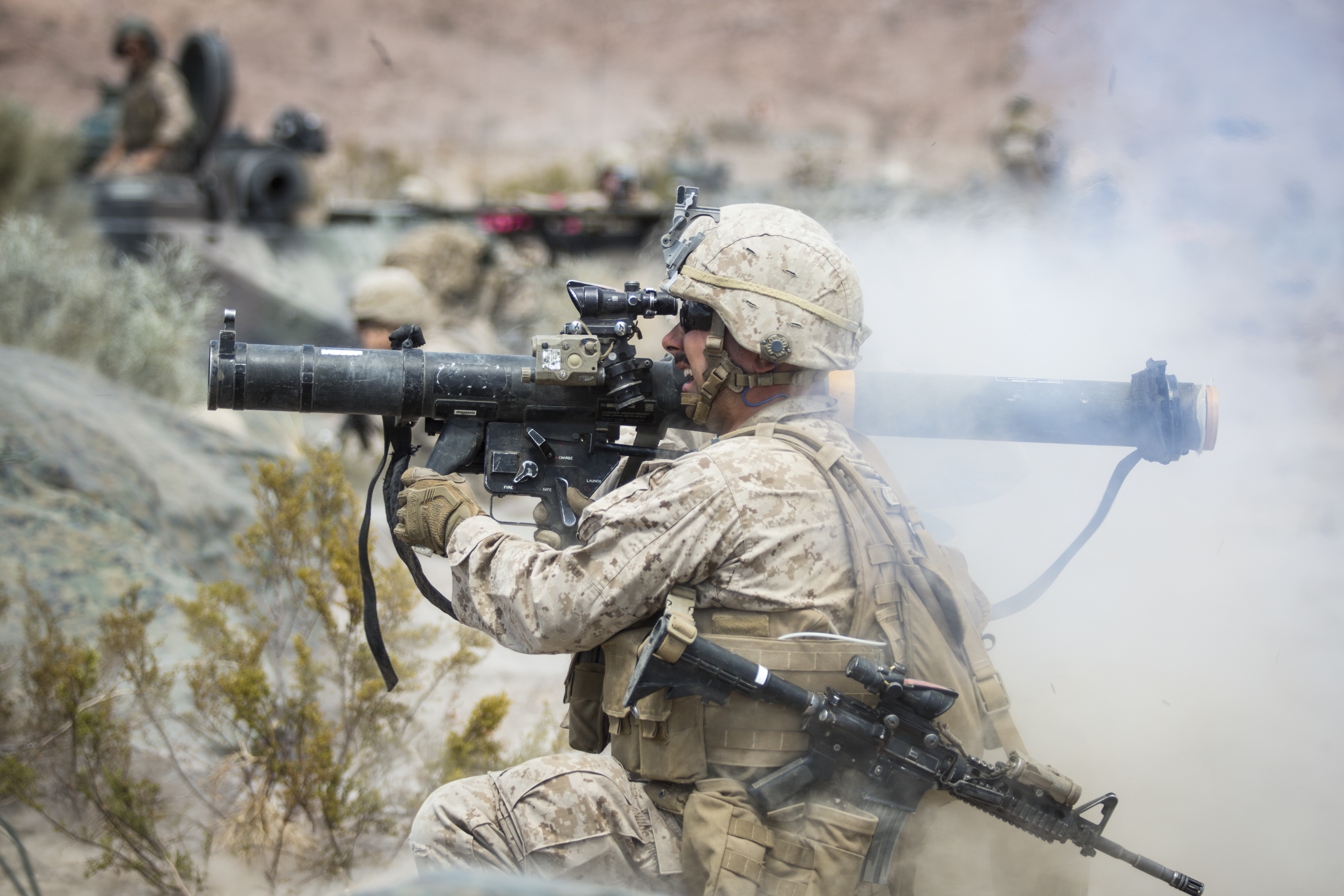
- Type: Multi-role (anti-fortification, anti-armor) rocket launcher
- Place of origin: United States

Service history
- In service: 1984–present
- Used by: See Operators
- Wars: Operation Just Cause; Gulf War; War in Afghanistan; Iraq War; Yemeni Civil War; Russo-Ukrainian War

Production history
- Designer: McDonnell Douglas
- Manufacturer: Nammo Talley (formerly Talley Defense Systems)
- Unit cost: US$13,000
- Variants: M141 Bunker Defeat Munition

Specifications
- Mass: 16.92 lb (7.67 kg) (empty); 29.34 lb (13.31 kg) (loaded with HEDM)
- Length: 760 mm (30 in) (unloaded) 1,371 mm (54.0 in) (loaded)
- Crew: 2 (can be operated by one person, but at lower rate of fire)
- Cartridge weight: 12.9 lb (5.9 kg) (HEDM); 14.25 lb (6.46 kg) (HEAA); 18.5 lb (8.4 kg) (SMAW-NE)
- Caliber: 83.5 mm (3.29 in) (bore diameter); 83.0 mm (3.27 in) (rocket diameter)
- Rate of fire: 3 rounds per minute (practical)
- Muzzle velocity: 220 m/s (720 ft/s) (HEDM); 208 m/s (680 ft/s) (HEAA); 150 m/s (490 ft/s) (SMAW-NE)
- Effective firing range: 250 m (820 ft) (HEDM); 500 m (1,600 ft) (HEAA); 250 m (820 ft) (SMAW-NE); Arming distance: 17 m (56 ft) (HEDM/HEAA); 8.23 m (27.0 ft) (SMAW-NE)
- Maximum firing range: 1,800 m (5,900 ft)
- Feed system: Detachable single-rocket casing
- Sights: Iron sights (250 m; 820 ft); Mk 42 Day Sight (3.8× magnification telescopic sight); RCO/ACOG (4×); AN/PEQ-15 or AN/PEQ-16; AN/PVS-17C (4.5×); AN/PAS-13G Light Weapon Thermal Sight (LWTS)
- Filling weight: HEDM: 2.4 lb (1.1 kg) Aluminized Comp A-3; HEAA: 1.89 lb (0.86 kg) Sedimentation Cast Octol; SMAW-NE: 4 lb (1.8 kg) PBXN-113

The Mk 153 Shoulder-Launched Multipurpose Assault Weapon (SMAW) is a smoothbore shoulder-fired rocket launcher. Primarily used as a portable assault weapon, or "bunker buster", it also possesses secondary anti-armor capabilities. Developed from the Israeli B-300, the SMAW was introduced to the United States Armed Forces in 1984. While it retains similar external characteristics to the B-300, the American-redesigned SMAW features a key distinction: the integration of a 9×51mm spotting rifle, which is an evolution of the one developed for the LAW 80. The spotting rifle's purpose is to enhance target acquisition and improve hit probability.

The SMAW's main purpose is to destroy bunkers, buildings, and light armored vehicles during assault operations, using high-explosive dual mode (HEDM) rockets. The SMAW can also engage armored vehicles using high-explosive anti-armor (HEAA) rockets, which has a maximum effective range of 500 m (550 yards) against a tank-sized target. Operations in Iraq also saw use of the SMAW-NE (Novel Explosive) rocket, a thermobaric rocket used to collapse buildings and cave openings.

Within the U.S. Marine Corps, the SMAW was typically operated by Assaultmen and Combat Engineers. Each rifle company had an assault section that consisted of 13 Marines and six SMAW rocket launchers. Led by a section leader, the section was divided into three assault squads, each consisting of four Marines. Each squad was further split into two teams of two Marines, with each team equipped with one SMAW rocket launcher.

== Service history ==
Serial production of the SMAW began in 1983, with the first units delivered in February 1984. By the completion of the initial contract in 1987, the U.S. manufacturer had supplied 1,828 Mk 153 launchers to the U.S. Marine Corps. The SMAW has since seen service with the U.S. Marine Corps in conflicts such as Operation Just Cause, the Gulf War, the War in Afghanistan, and the Iraq War.

During Operation Just Cause in Panama (1989), the U.S. Army recognized the need for a lightweight weapon capable of defeating bunkers, fortifications, and other fortified defensive structures. Despite this, the Army did not have a suitable weapon at the time. As a result, during Operation Desert Storm (1991), the Army had to borrow 125 Mk 153 Shoulder-Launched Multipurpose Assault Weapons (SMAW) from the U.S. Marine Corps. It became clear that the weapon, while effective, was too heavy and long for use by paratroopers. But, the Army's standard M136 AT4 also proved unsuitable for bunker-busting. In response, the Army initiated the Multi-Purpose Individual Munition (MPIM) program in September 1991. This eventually lead to the adoption of the M141 BDM, a single-shot, disposable version of the Mk 153 SMAW using the same HEDM rocket.

In the early-2000s, the Mk 153 Mod 0 SMAW had a series of modifications to address several of its shortcomings. These modifications included a resleeving process for bubbled launch tubes, rewriting/drafting operator and technical manuals, a kit that reduces environmental intrusion into the trigger mechanism, and an optical sight modification to allow the HEAA rocket to be used effectively against moving armor targets. Boresight bracket kits were also fielded that solved the loss of boresight problem between the launch tube and the spotting rifle.

The Mk 153 SMAW has proven to be a vital asset in urban warfare, particularly during the Iraq War. In Iraq, it was extensively used in the Second Battle of Fallujah, where it demonstrated its effectiveness in destroying enemy-held buildings. Marines employed the SMAW Novel Explosive (SMAW-NE) thermobaric rocket to collapse structures and neutralize fortified positions. For instance, a single Marine reportedly leveled 12 buildings with 14 rockets in one day.

The SMAW's destructive capability significantly enhanced small-unit firepower, allowing infantry to engage entrenched enemies without relying solely on larger, less maneuverable systems like tanks. However, the SMAW-NE round lacked the penetrating power needed for certain walls in Fallujah. To overcome this, Marines would first use a High-Explosive Dual-Mode (HEDM) rocket to create a hole, then fire an NE rocket through the opening to collapse the structure. Despite occasional difficulties in wall breaching, the weapon proved to be an indispensable tool in urban assault operations.

In 2023, Ukrainian forces, including the 68th Jager Brigade, used the Mk 153 SMAW in operations and training to combat Russian forces. Documented deployments showed the weapon's role in urban combat and targeting fortified positions.

== Improvement programs ==
=== Follow-On To SMAW ===
In 2002, the Marine Corps began a program to develop a successor to the SMAW system, tentatively titled "Follow-On To SMAW". The contract was awarded to Lockheed Martin and Israel Military Industries (IMI); this resulted in the enhanced FGM-172 SRAW. In combat operations, it was ultimately used to augment, rather than replace, the SMAW system.

=== SMAW II program ===
In 2008, a replacement program was again initiated and titled the SMAW II. It was developed in tandem with a round capable of being fired from an enclosed area without ill effects on the environment and personnel. Its combined weight is 13.5 kilograms (29.7 lb)—5.3 kg (11.7 lb) for the launcher, 8.2 kg (18 lb) for the rocket. The contract was worth up to US$51.7 million.

=== SMAW II Serpent ===
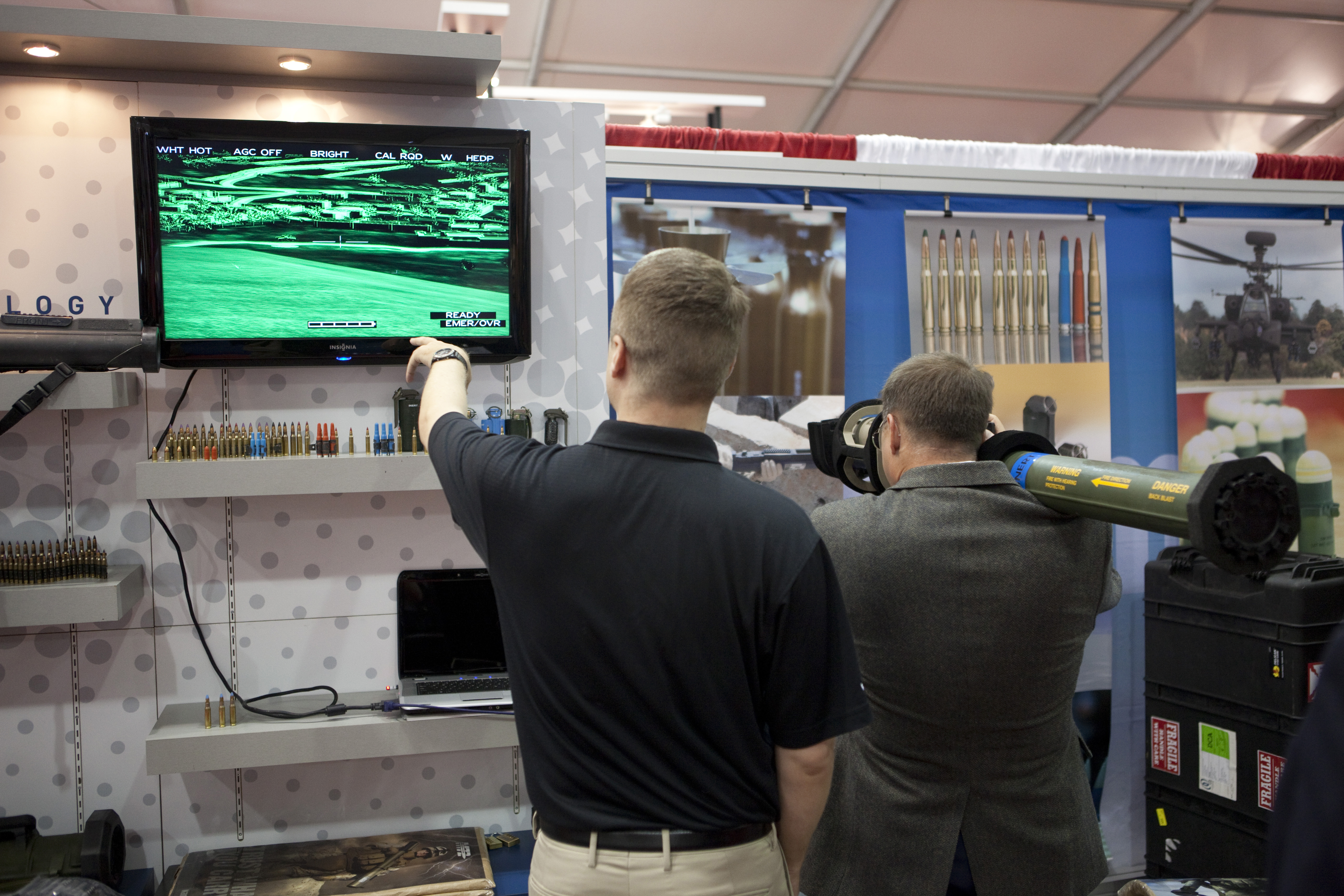
A Serpent demonstrator

In 2012, Raytheon Missile Systems developed a SMAW II launcher named Serpent, and Nammo Talley developed new rounds for the Serpent. The Serpent is similar in many respects to the first SMAW launcher, replacing the standard SMAW launcher's spotting gun with more sophisticated fire control electronics. The sighting unit on the launcher is enclosed in a unique protective cage, which is also a carry handle.

The development reduced the over-all weight by four and a half pounds (2.0 kg) from the older SMAW launcher. The Serpent fires the same rounds as the standard SMAW and supports new and improved/enhanced rounds. The Serpent was never adopted for service. Instead the USMC eventually adopted the Mk 153 Mod 2 to replace the service's SMAW launchers by 2020.

== Variants ==
=== Mk 153 Mod 0 ===
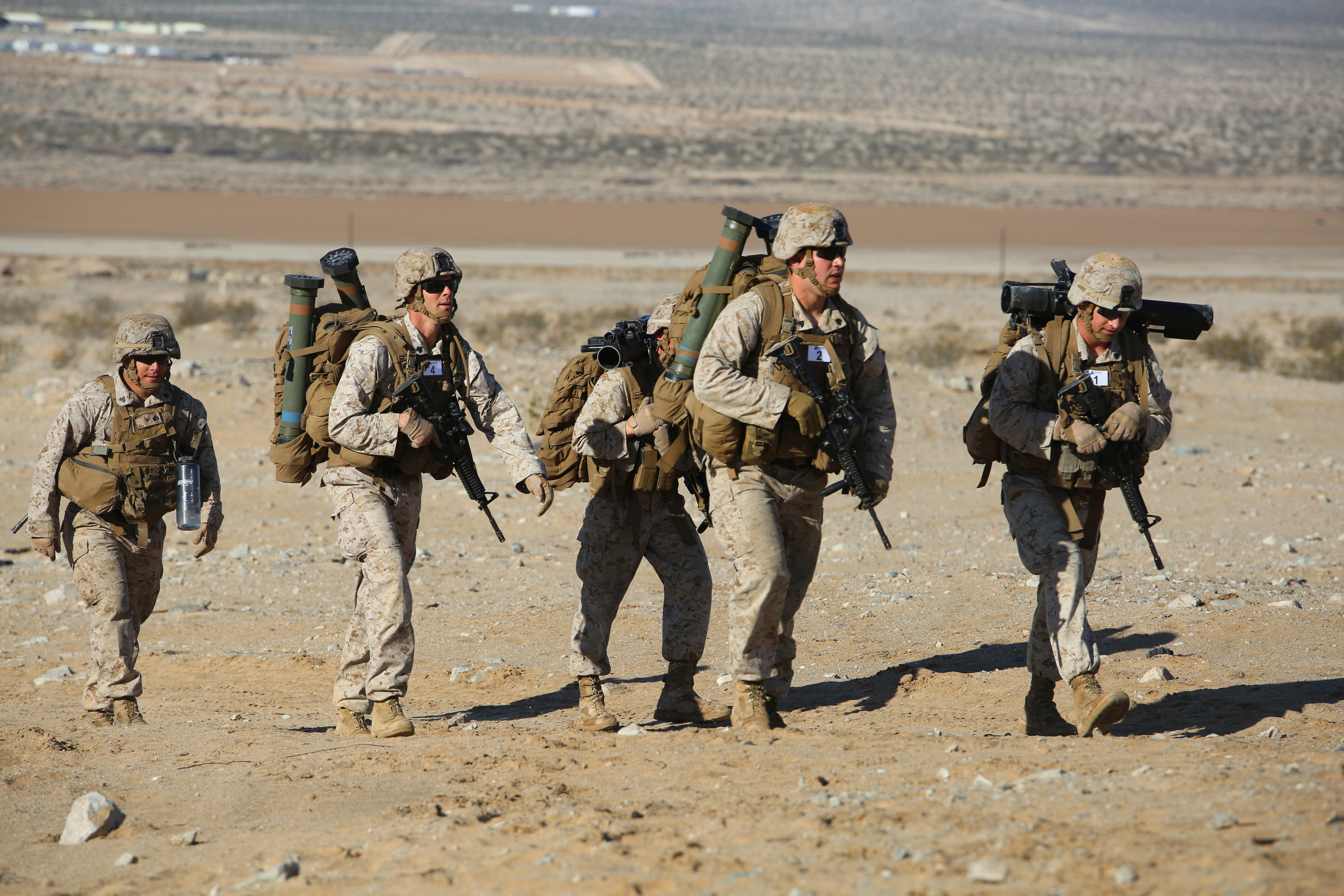
Two SMAW teams

The Mk 153 Mod 0 SMAW fires 83 mm (3.27-inch) rockets through an 83.5 mm (3.29-inch) diameter launch tube. The system can fire a variety of encased rockets, such as the Mk 3 Mod 0 High-Explosive Dual Mode (HEDM) Rocket, the Mk 6 Mod 0 High-Explosive Anti-Armor (HEAA) Rocket, the Mk 7 Mod 0 Common Practice Rocket, and the Mk 80 Mod 0 Novel Explosive (NE) Rocket. The rocket encasements are loaded into the rear of the launcher, and the launch tube is constructed from a durable fiberglass-epoxy composite material with a gel coated bore.

The launcher consists of the launch tube, spotting rifle, electro-mechanical firing mechanism, mounting brackets, open battle sights and an optic mount for the Mk 42 Mod 0 day sight, RCO, AN/PVS-4 or AN/PVS-17C night sights. The system can also be aimed at night with an infrared aiming laser from the AN/PEQ-15 or AN/PEQ-16 in conjunction with night vision, since the IR laser is attached to the optic mount that can change elevation based on the range it is set to. The firing mechanism mechanically fires the spotting rifle and uses a magneto to fire the rocket.

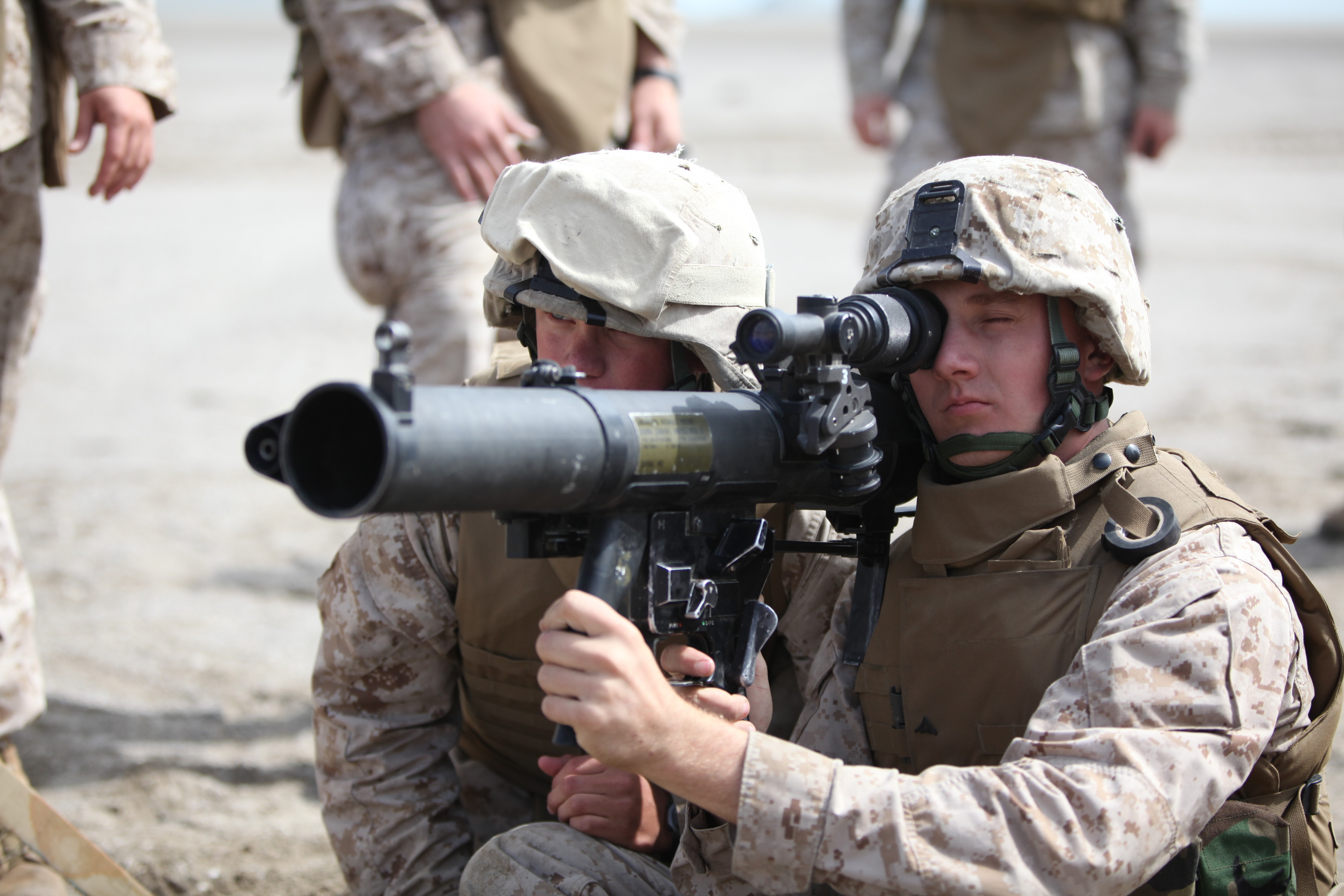
Mk 153 Mod 0 with the Mk 42 Day Sight (3.8×)

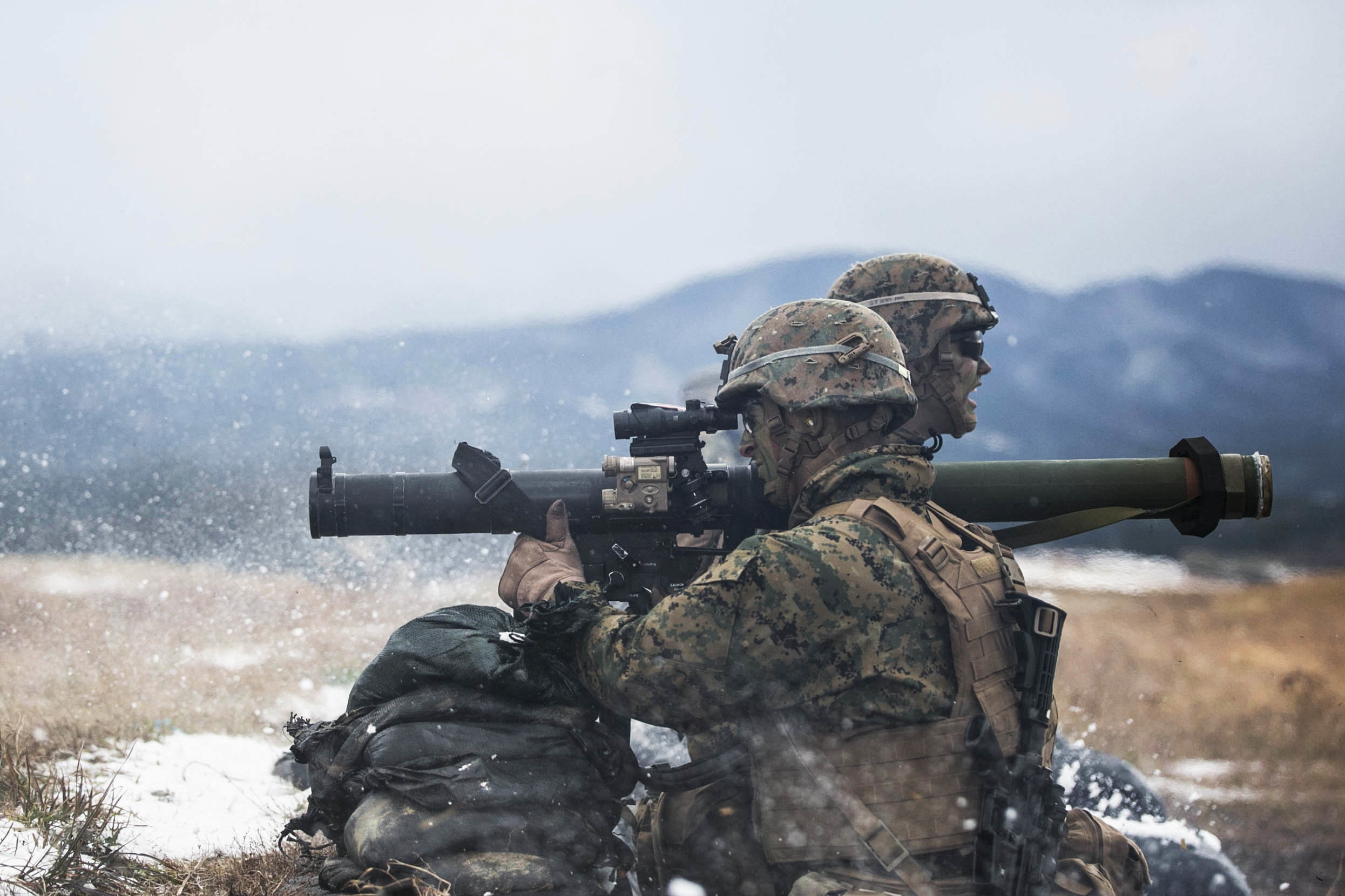
Mk 153 Mod 0 with an RCO (4×) and AN/PEQ-16

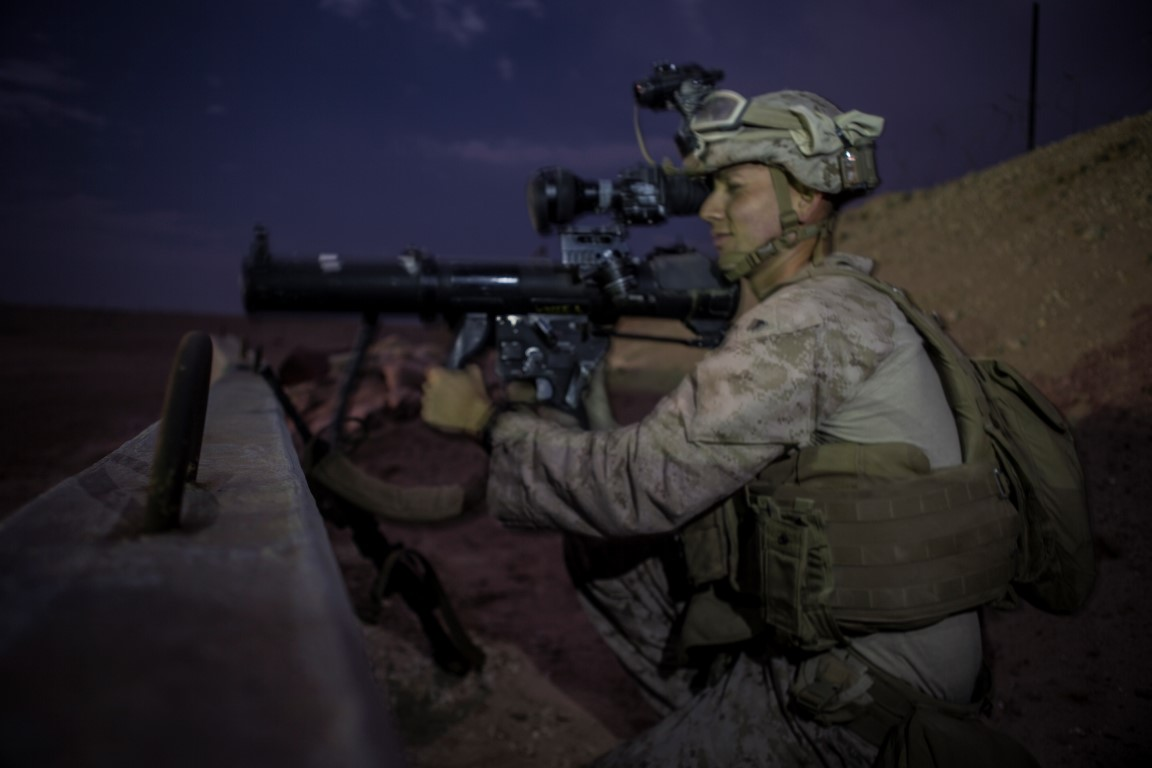
Mk 153 Mod 0 with an AN/PVS-17C (4.5×)

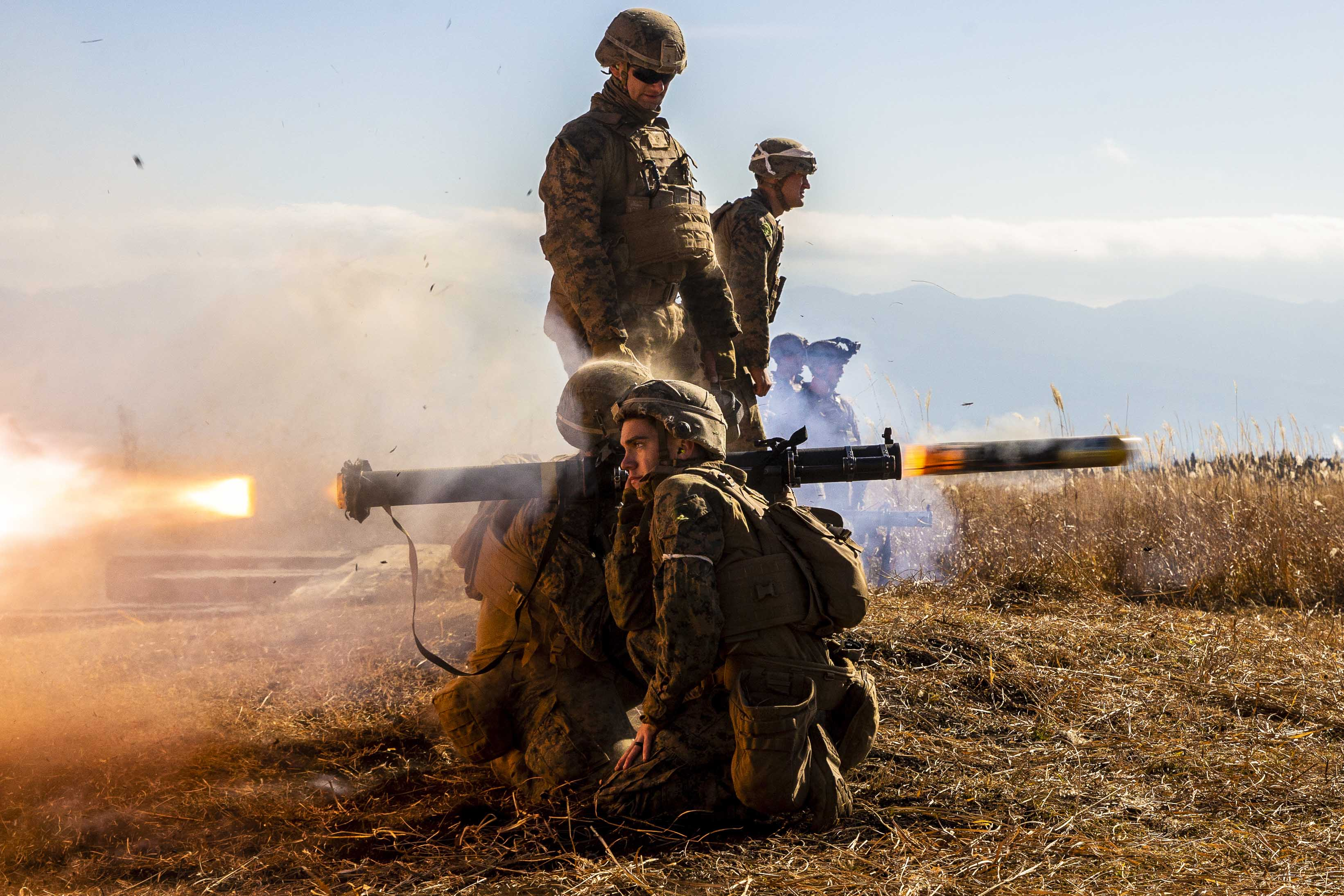
HEDM rocket being fired

The spotting rifle is mounted on the right side of the launch tube and operates semi-automatically through primer actuation. When fired, the primer sets back, unlocking the breech and ejecting the spent round. The mounting brackets secure the spotting rifle to the launcher and allow for precise alignment adjustments to ensure the spotting rifle is properly aligned with the launch tube.

The 9×51mm Mk 217 Mod 0 spotting round is ballistically matched with the rocket, improving the gunner's first-round hit probability. Spotting cartridges are stored in a six-round magazine located in the cap of the encased rocket. Each spotting round features a special 9mm projectile containing a tracer compound, which is crimped into a 7.62×51mm NATO casing, with a .22 Hornet primer.

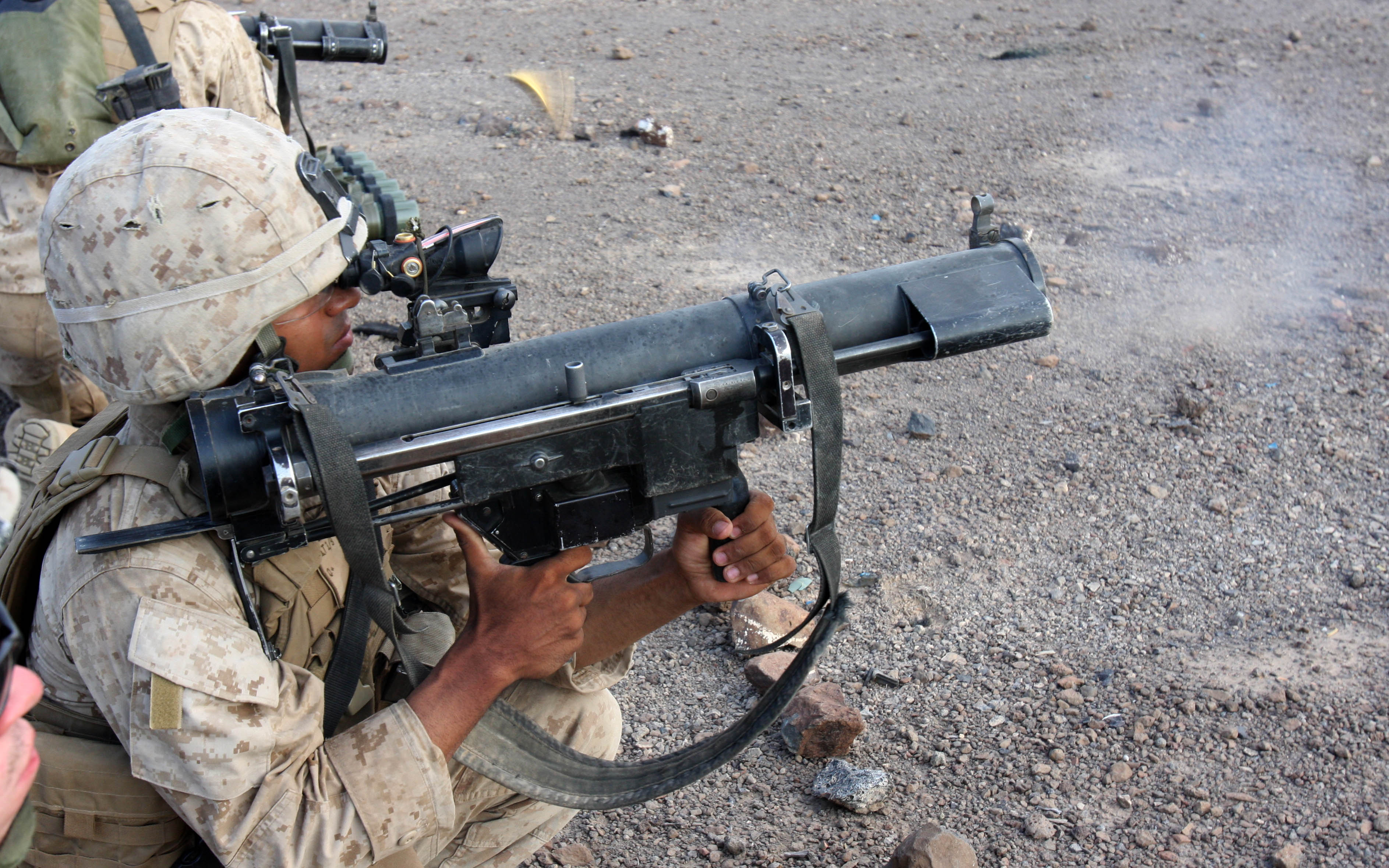
Spotting rifle

Spotting rifle being fired

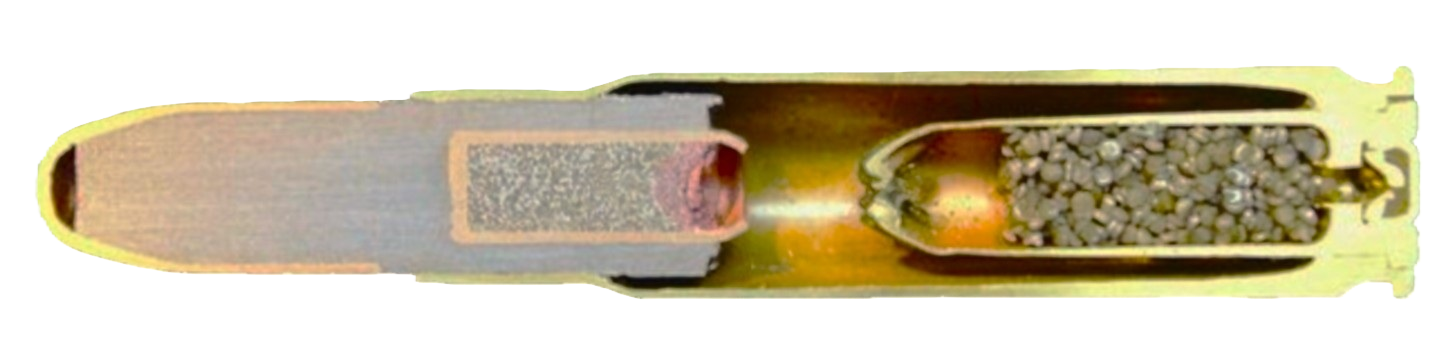
Mk 217 Mod 0 spotting round cutaway

=== Mk 153 Mod 1 ===
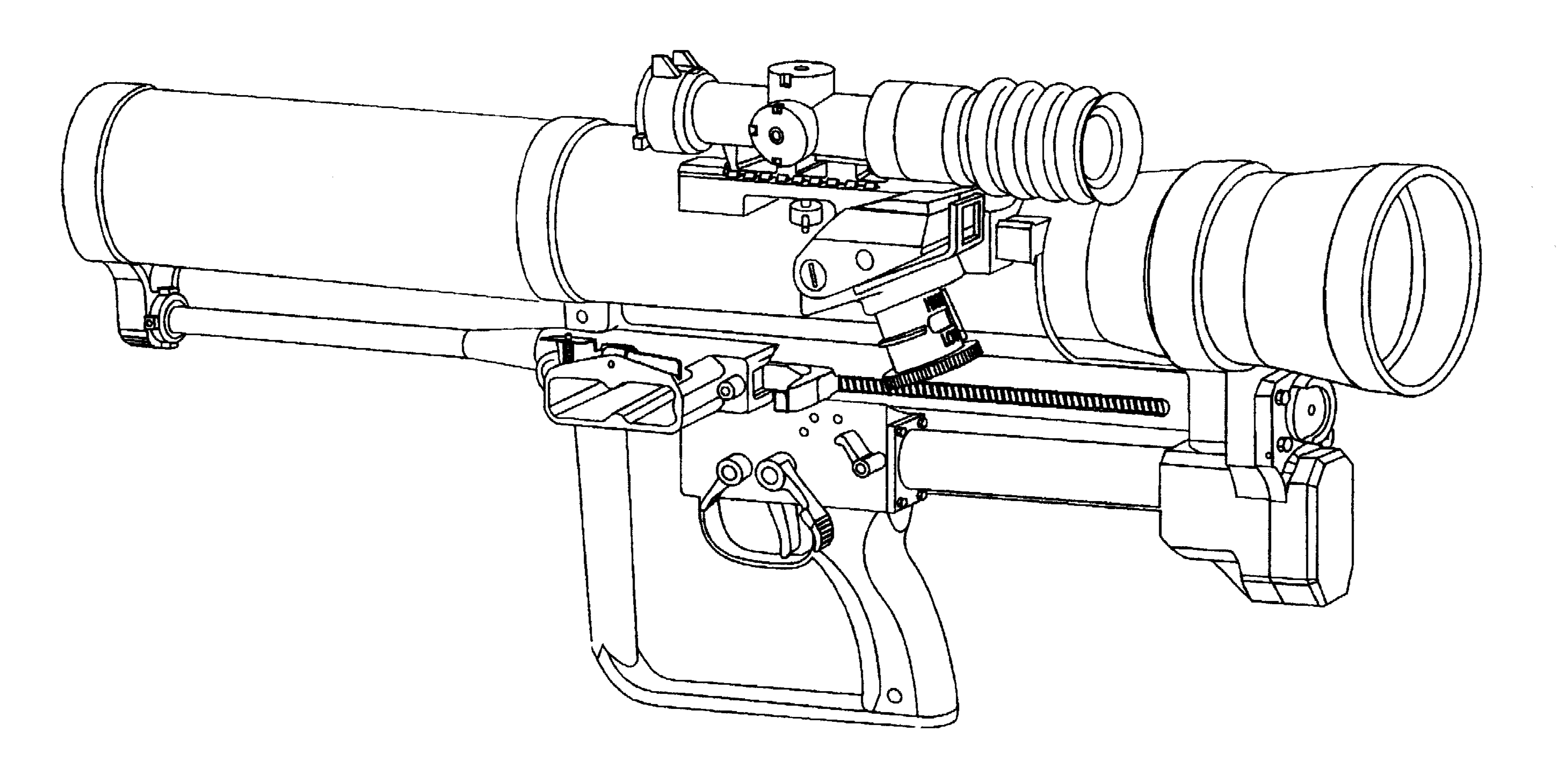
A patent drawing of a SMAW variant with the spotting rifle underneath the launch tube

The Department of the Navy filed a patent application on October 30, 1995, for a design named "Shoulder-launched multiple-purpose assault weapon" that featured a rearrangement of the spotting rifle underneath the launch tube, with the patent officially granted and published on January 27, 1998. While it is unclear if this patent officially corresponds to the Mk 153 Mod 1, this reference includes a picture of the same design, labeled "Mk 153 Mod 1 Launcher."

The rearranged spotting rifle was intended to make the weapon system more balanced and address accessibility issues found with the Mod 0, where the spotting rifle was mounted on the right side. This redesign aimed to streamline operations by centralizing the weapon's controls and improving the gunner's ability to reload the spotting rifle independently. It was claimed to offer improved reliability while also reducing the number of parts for easier maintenance, as well as reducing weight. There is no evidence the Mk 153 Mod 1 was ever adopted for service.

=== Mk 153 Mod 2 ===
Mk 153 Mod 2 SMAW firing

The Mk 153 Mod 2 is an enhanced variant, featuring an electronic modular ballistic sight (MBS) in place of the 9 mm spotting system. The MBS system consists of the AN/PSQ-23A laser rangefinder and the AN/PAS-13G Light Weapon Thermal Sight (LWTS). To engage a target, the gunner first acquires the target using the thermal sight (AN/PAS-13G), which allows them to see the target in various environmental conditions. Once the target is acquired, the gunner depresses a button on the front grip to activate the laser rangefinder (AN/PSQ-23A). The rangefinder emits a laser pulse to measure the range to the target. This range data is then sent to the thermal sight, which provides a firing solution using a displaced reticle that adjusts the crosshairs for distance and environmental factors. The gunner then aligns the reticle with the target and fires. The Mod 2 also has a reduced weight of 13 lb (5.9 kg) with the MBS attached, along with other improvements, like increased pad size on the forward grip and foldable backup iron sights. The Mk 153 Mod 2 reached full operational capability (FOC) across the United States Marine Corps between 2019 and 2020.

== Rocket types ==
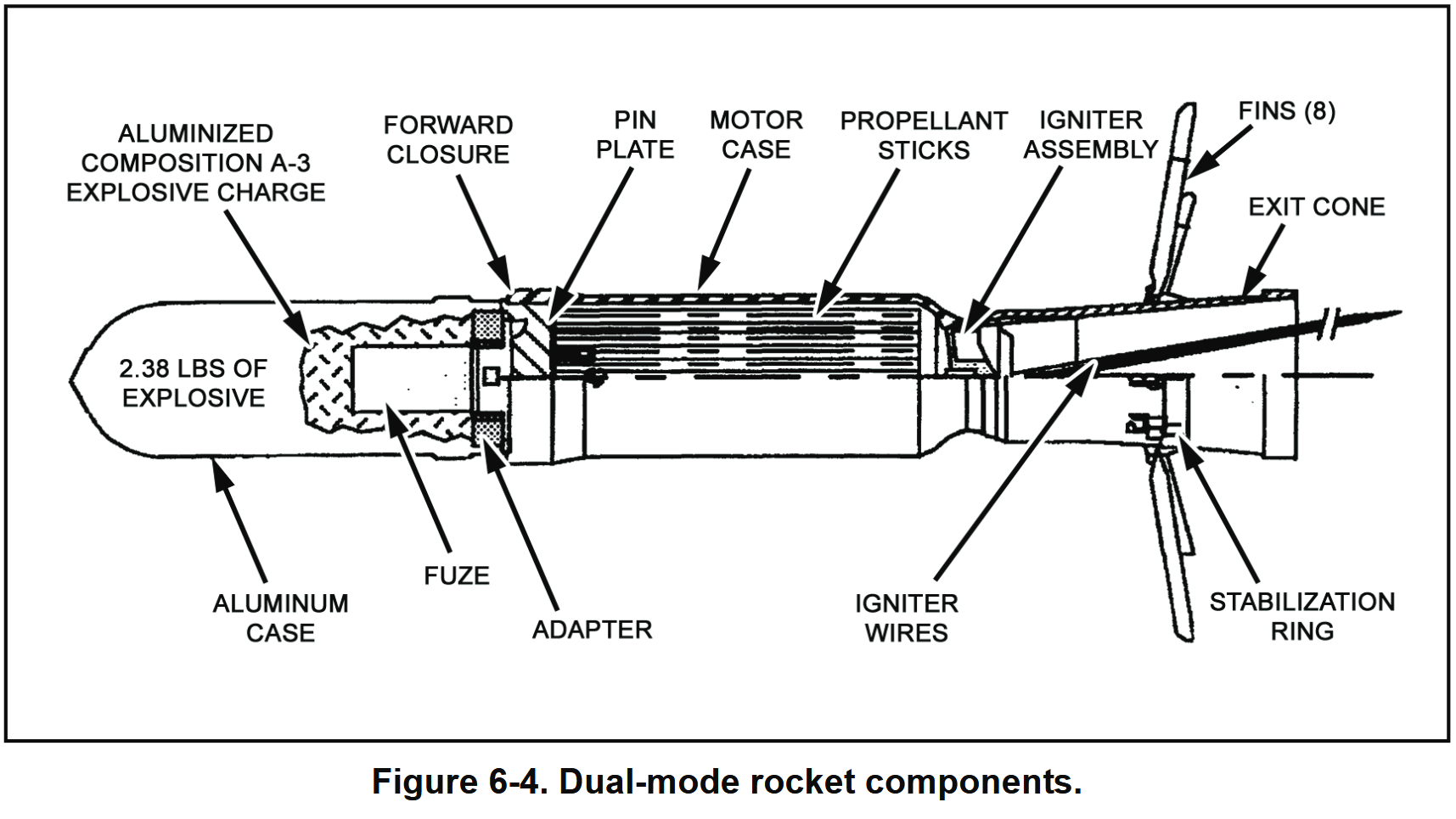
HEDM rocket components

- The Mk 3 Mod 0 Encased High-Explosive, Dual Mode (HEDM) rocket is effective against bunkers, masonry, concrete walls and light armor. It uses the Mk 420 Mod 0, a deceleration-based fuze located at the rear of the warhead, to automatically distinguish between soft targets (low deceleration) and hard targets (high deceleration). For hard targets, such as reinforced concrete walls or armored vehicles, the warhead's aluminum casing mushrooms upon impact, increasing the contact surface area between the warhead and the target to maximize blast effects. For soft targets, the rocket employs a delayed detonation, enabling deeper penetration into structures like sandbag bunkers or buildings to maximize internal damage. The warhead is filled with Composition A-3, enhanced with powdered aluminum to increase the explosive's energy output and overall destructive power. The HEDM round can penetrate 20 cm (7.9 inches) of double-reinforced concrete walls, 30 cm (12 inches) of brick, up to 20 mm (0.79 inches) of rolled homogenous armor, or up to 210 cm (6.9 feet) of wood-reinforced sandbags. It is sometimes referred to as "High-Explosive Dual Purpose (HEDP)", instead of HEDM, in some sources, but it clearly states "Dual Mode" in U.S. Marine Corps publications, on the rocket encasement, and on the rocket itself (as seen in the picture below).
- The Mk 4 Mod 0 Encased, Practice and Mk 7 Mod 0 Encased, Common Practice rockets are used in training. The warhead consists of a blue plastic projectile attached to a rocket motor similar to the HEDM rocket. The rocket contains no explosive. It does not damage a target except by kinetic energy. On impact, the plastic warhead ruptures, dispensing an inert white spotting powder.

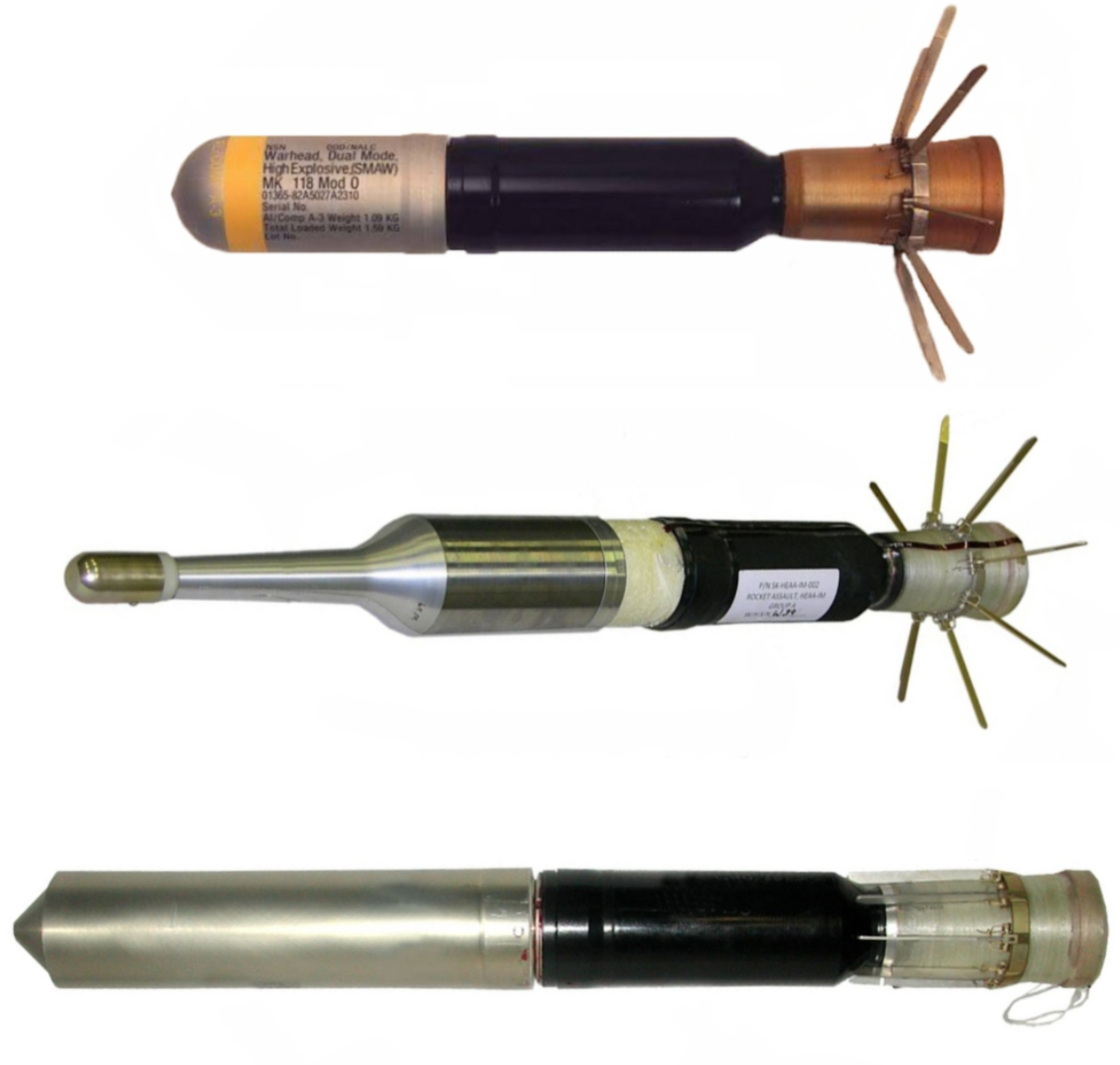
High-Explosive, Dual Mode (HEDM) rocket (Top), High-Explosive, Anti-Armor (HEAA) rocket (Middle), and Novel Explosive (SMAW-NE) rocket (Bottom)

- The Mk 6 Mod 0 Encased High-Explosive, Anti-Armor (HEAA) rocket is effective against current tanks without added armor, and uses a standoff rod on the detonator, allowing the explosive force to be focused on a small point and for maximum damage against targets. The HEAA rocket uses a shaped charge warhead with 1.89 lb (0.86 kilograms) octol explosive, which can penetrate up to the equivalent of 600 mm (24 in) of rolled homogeneous armor. The unit cost of the Mk 6 HEAA round is $25,000. The HEAA rocket was not initially fielded with the SMAW.
- The Mk 80 Mod 0 Encased Novel Explosive (SMAW-NE) rocket is effective against caves, buildings, and bunkers. The SMAW-NE has an enhanced-blast warhead with a 4 lb (1.8 kilograms) charge of PBXN-113 and a slightly modified version of the dual mode fuze used by the HEDM rocket, the Mk 420 Mod 1. The Indian Head Naval Surface Warfare Center teamed with Marine Corps Systems Command and Talley Defense Systems to respond to an urgent U.S. Marine Corps need for a shoulder-launched enhanced-blast warhead in 2003. It was used in combat during both the first and second offensives in Fallujah, in 2004.

== Backblast area ==
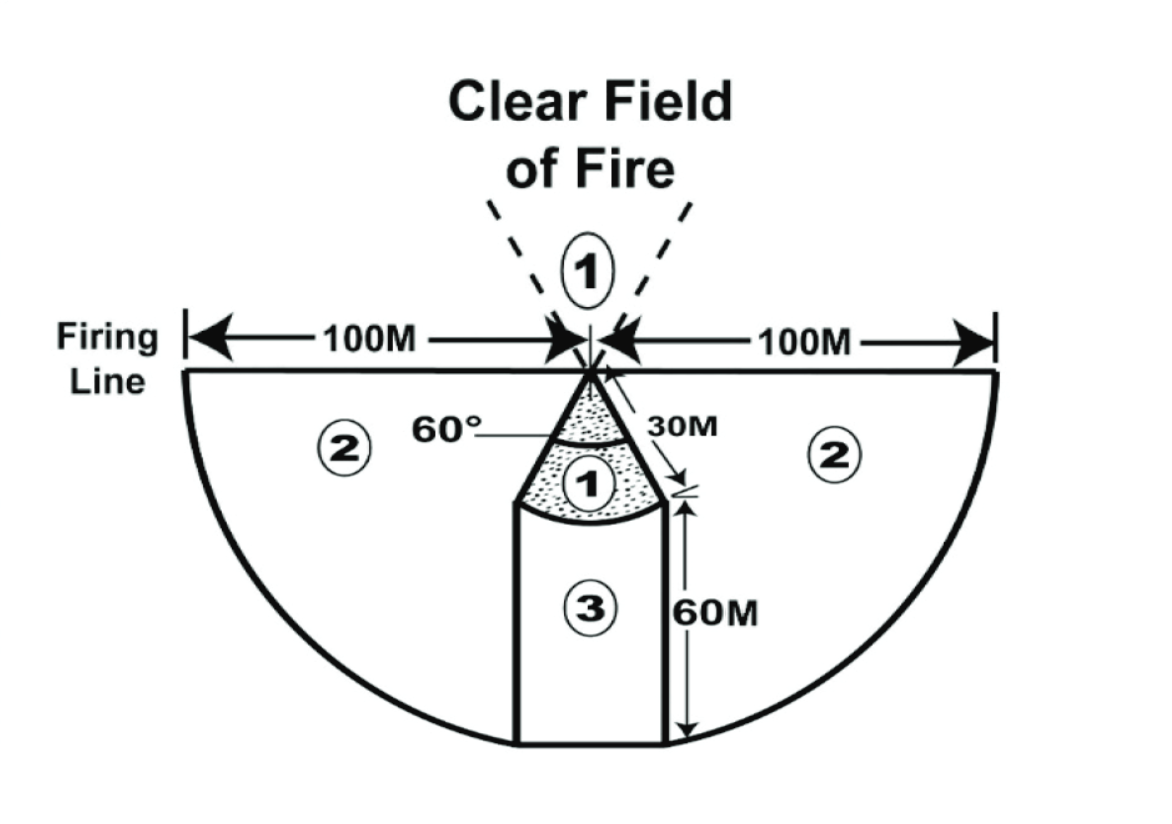
The backblast area of the Mk 153 SMAW

As with all recoilless rocket launchers, the backblast generated upon firing is a significant safety concern. When the rocket is fired, the propellant is fully expelled within the rocket's encasement, resulting in a loud and forceful backblast. This backblast extends in a 90 m (300 ft), 60° cone behind the weapon. It is lethal out to 30 m (98 ft) and still extremely dangerous to 90 m (300 ft).

An assistant gunner is often used during employment of the weapon system to monitor the backblast area and clear it of fellow troops, or to notify the gunner of obstructions that could reflect the force of the backblast back at the gun team. The gunner is only cleared to launch a rocket when he hears the command "Backblast area secure" from his assistant gunner.

The figure to the right displays the danger and caution zones of the Mk 153 SMAW. No personnel are allowed in danger area 1, as death or severe injury may occur from blast and flying debris. Anyone in caution area 2 must wear helmet, body armor, ballistic goggles, and hearing protection. Personnel should remain clear of caution area 3 as injury may be sustained from flying debris and excessive sound pressure levels (i.e., 140 decibels or more).

== Operators ==
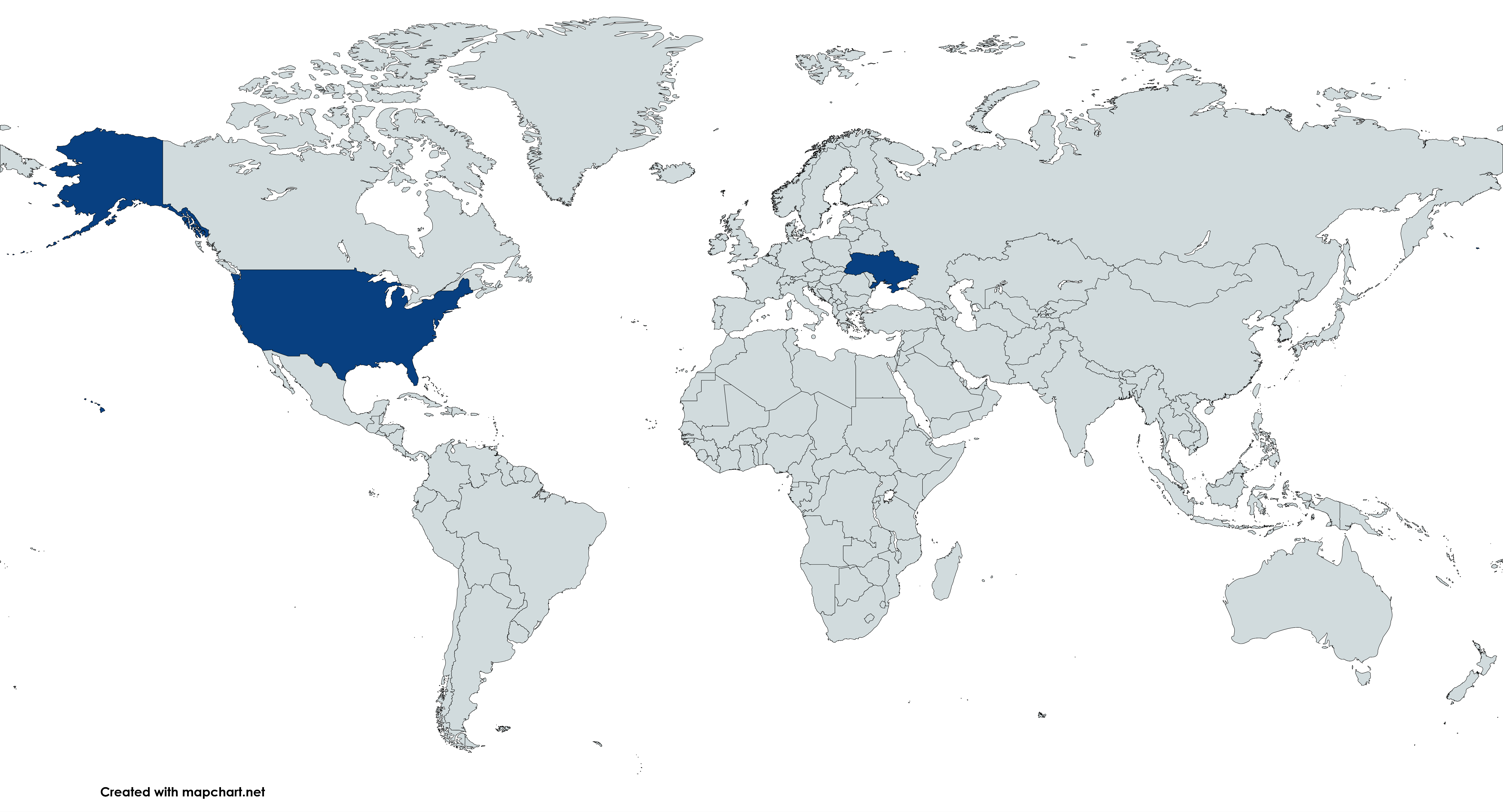
A map of SMAW operators in blue

=== Current operators ===
- Ukraine: Armed Forces of Ukraine using the Mk 153 Mod 0
- United States: United States Marine Corps with Mk 153 Mod 0/Mod 2.

=== Former operators ===
- United States: United States Army borrowed 125 Mk 153 Mod 0 SMAWs from the Marine Corps and later returned them.

== See also ==
- B-300
- Breda Folgore
- Carl Gustaf 8.4cm recoilless rifle
- Kestrel (rocket launcher)
- LRAC F1
- M141 Bunker Defeat Munition (SMAW-D)
- M79 Osa
