= B-300 =

Anti-tank weapon

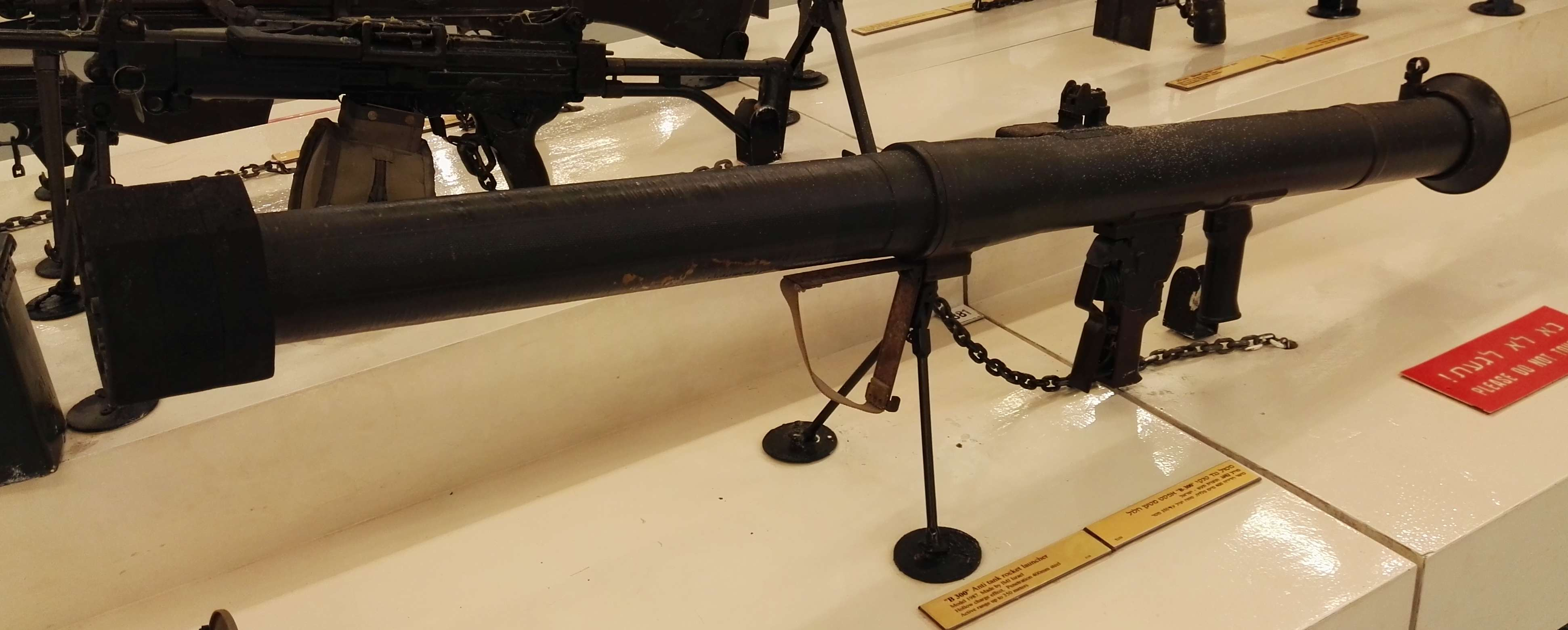
- Type: Anti-tank
- Place of origin: Israel

Service history
- Used by: See Operators
- Wars: Lebanese Civil War; First and Second Intifada; 2006 Lebanon War; Gaza War; Second Nagorno-Karabakh War

Production history
- Designer: Israel Military Industries
- Designed: 1970s
- Manufacturer: Israel Military Industries
- Produced: 1980s–present

Specifications
- Mass: 3.65 kg (8.0 lb) empty 8 kg (18 lb) loaded
- Length: 1,440 mm (57 in)
- Crew: 1
- Caliber: 82 mm (3.2 in)
- Rate of fire: 3 rounds per minute
- Muzzle velocity: 280 m/s (920 ft/s)
- Maximum firing range: 400 m (1,300 ft)
- Sights: Iron, telescopic, night vision

The B-300 is a reusable man-portable anti-tank weapon system developed by Israel Military Industries in the late 1970s for use by the Israel Defense Forces. The B-300 can be carried and operated by a single operator and is effective to approximately 400 meters (1,312 ft). Pre-packaged munitions and simple operating mechanisms make the weapon quite versatile, permitting use by airborne, motorized, and ground troops alike. When defence publications first heard reports of the B-300 in the early 1980s, various reports stated in error that it was an improved Israeli manufactured version of the Russian RPG-7.

== Usage ==
Munitions used by the B-300 are propelled by a solid rocket motor, and can be equipped with one of two warhead variants. The first, high-explosive anti-tank round, provides specialized support for anti-tank missions. The second, known as a high-explosive follow-through round, is designed for use against fortified targets or enemy units behind cover. A primary charge punches a hole through the protective structure, allowing a secondary anti-personnel charge to pass through and detonate within the building. The B-300 was produced during the 1980s and entered service in limited quantities within Israeli Defence Forces SF units.

== Further development ==
=== SMAW ===
The Shoulder-launched Multipurpose Assault Weapon (SMAW) is a shoulder-launched rocket weapon, designed by McDonnell Douglas, with the primary function of being a portable anti-armor rocket launcher. It entered service in the U.S. Marine Corps in 1984. It has a maximum range of 500 m against a tank-sized target.

=== Shipon ===
During the late 1990s, IMI introduced the Shipon, an advanced disposable multi-purpose shoulder-launched rocket system consisting of a launch tube and FCS module. The Shipon includes an advanced fire-control system, helping to aim and increasing effective range to 600 meters. The Shipon fires two types of rockets: HEAA Tandem, which penetrates 800 mm of steel armor after explosive reactive armor, and a bunker-buster rocket. The Shipon is in service within Israeli Special Forces units in the IDF and the YAMAM (the elite police counter-terror unit).

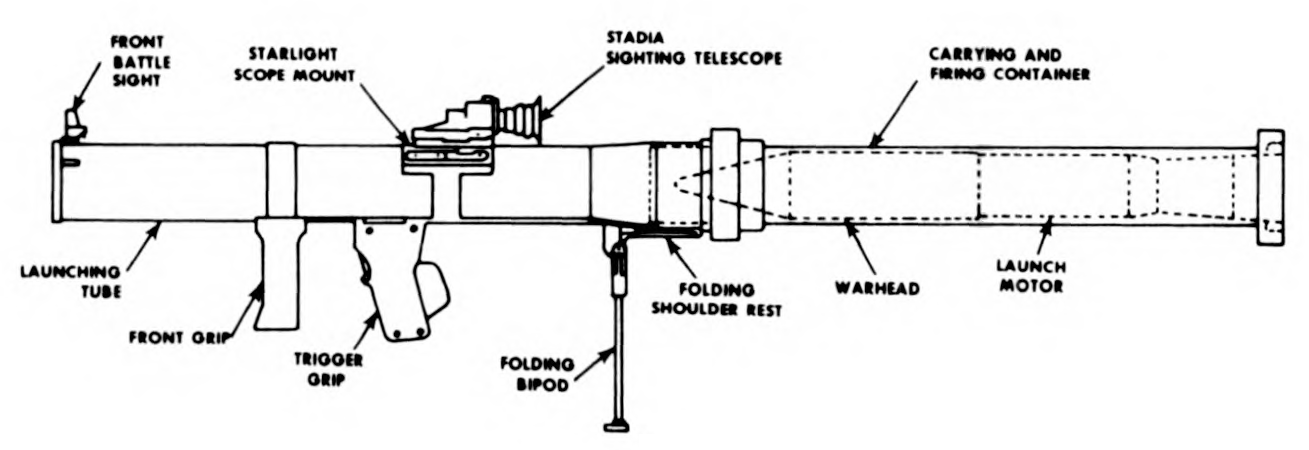
B-300

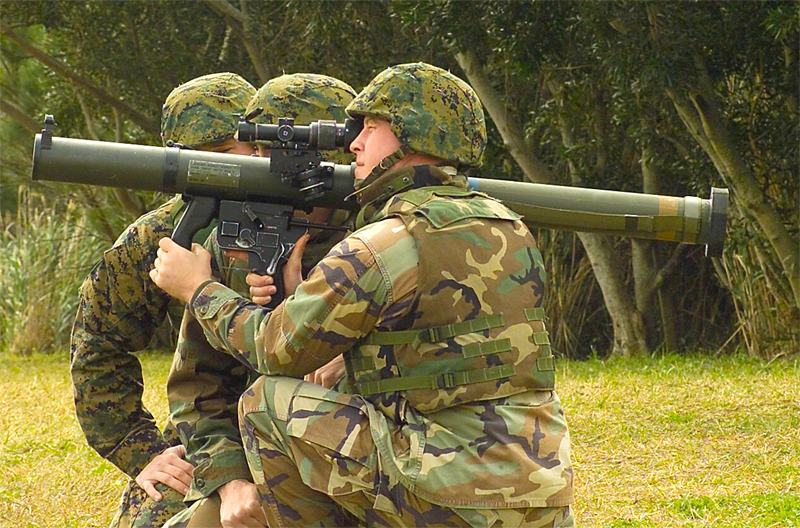
SMAW

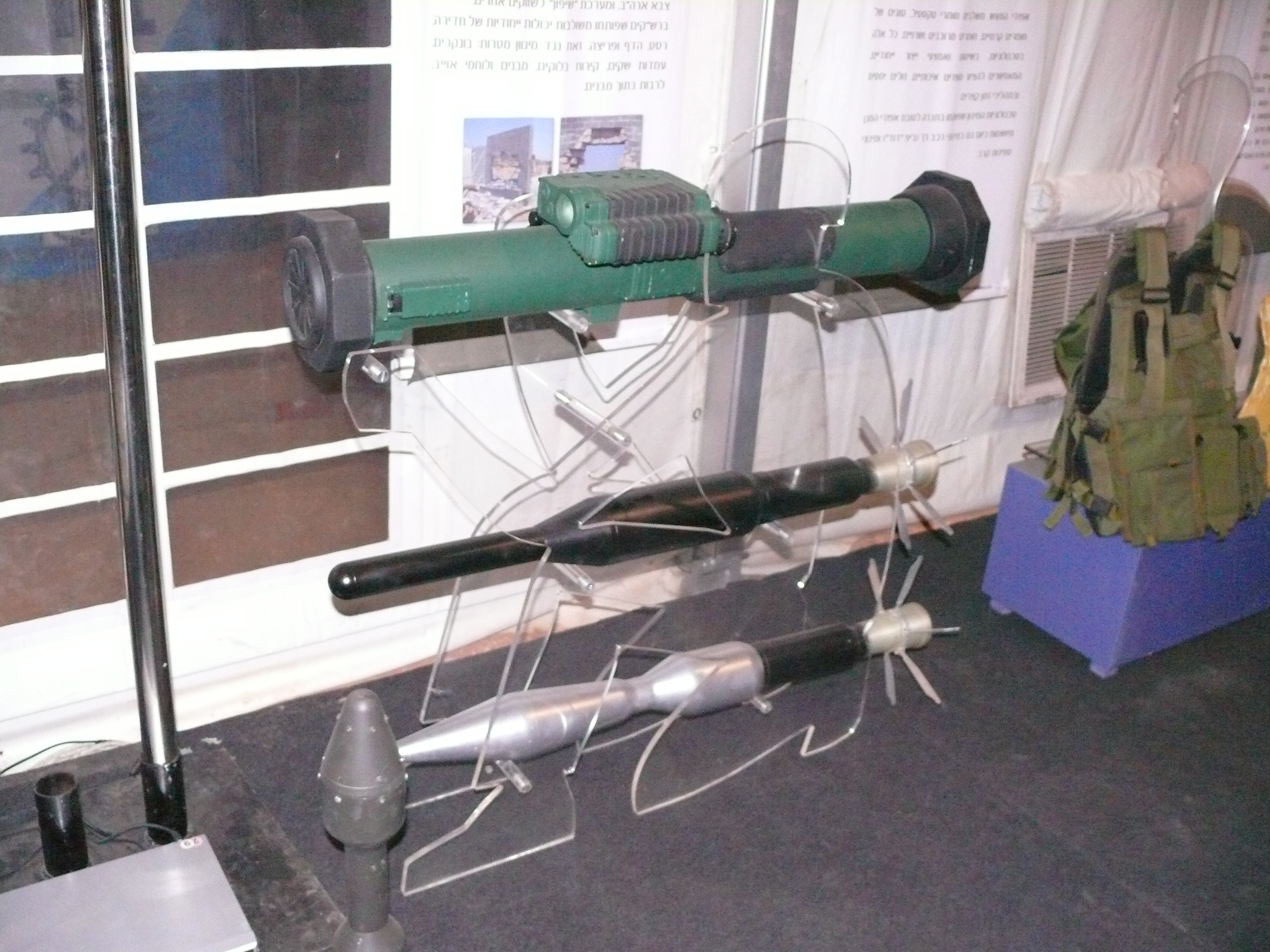
IMI Shipon with its rockets

== Operators ==
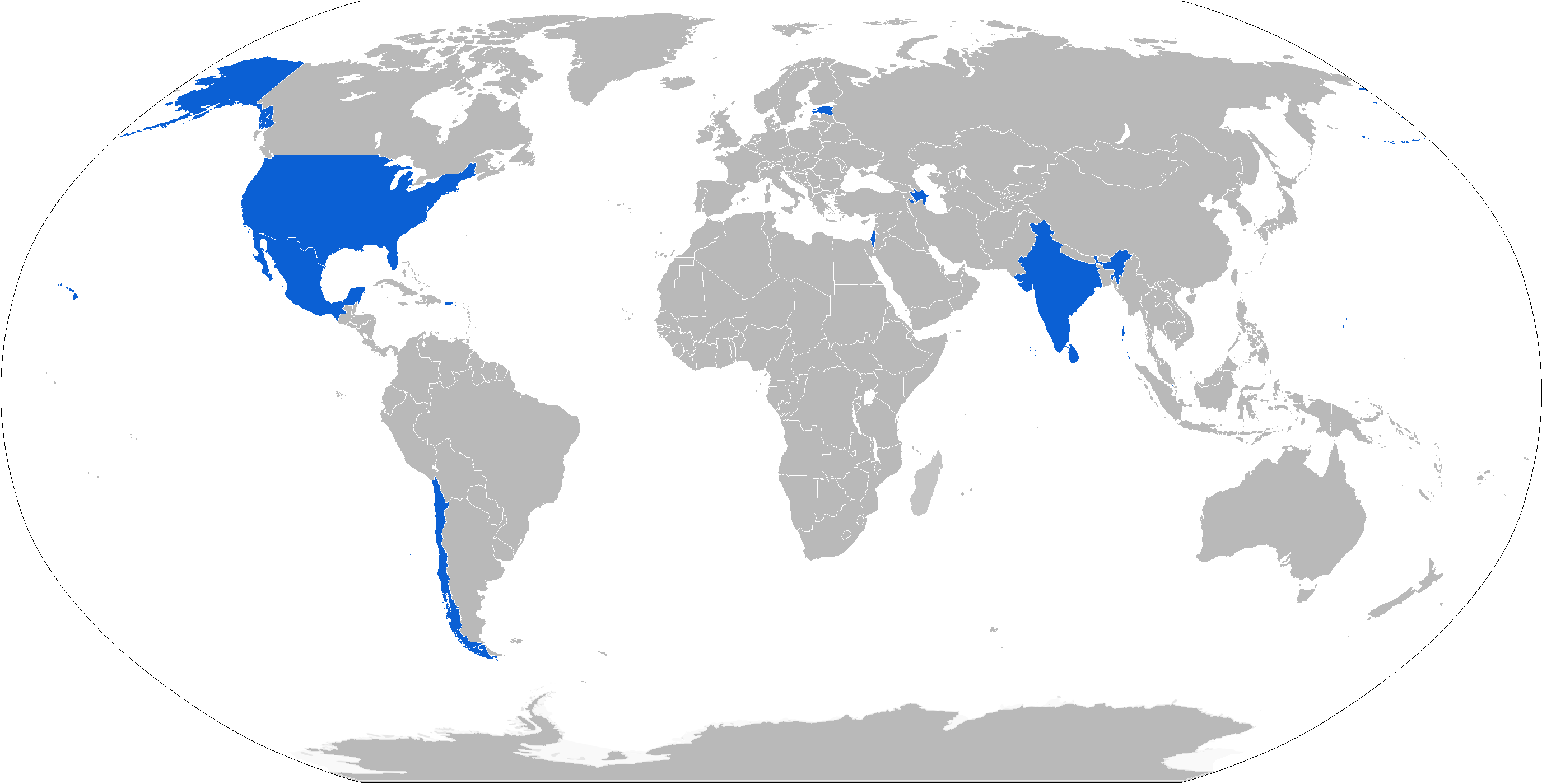
Map with B-300 operators in blue

- Azerbaijan
- Chile
- El Salvador
- Estonia
- India
- Israel
- Mexico
- Singapore
- Sri Lanka
- United States: Used under the designation Mk153 SMAW.
- Trinidad and Tobago
