= M141 Bunker Defeat Munition =

Disposable shoulder-fired rocket launcher

M141 BDM
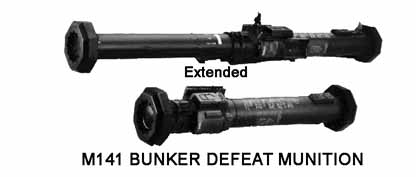
- M141 BDM (SMAW-D) in its storage/closed configuration and extended configuration
- Type: Anti-fortification
- Place of origin: United States

Service history
- In service: 1999–present
- Used by: See Operators
- Wars: War in Afghanistan; Iraq War; Russo-Ukrainian War

Production history
- Designer: McDonnell-Douglas
- Manufacturer: Talley Defense Systems (Nammo Defense Systems)

Specifications
- Mass: 7.1 kg (15.7 lbs)
- Length: Extended: 1372 mm (54.0 in); Closed: 812 mm (32.0 in)
- Caliber: 83.5 mm (fires 83 mm rockets)
- Muzzle velocity: 217 m/s (712 ft/s)
- Effective firing range: Minimum arming range: 15 meters Maximum effective range: 300 meters
- Maximum firing range: Max sight range: 500 meters Max rocket range: 2000 meters
- Filling weight: 2.38 lbs (1.08 kg) of Aluminized Comp A-3

The M141 bunker defeat munition (BDM) is a disposable single-shot, shoulder-fired rocket launcher designed to defeat hardened structures. It is a modification of the United States Marine Corps Mk 153 shoulder-launched multipurpose assault weapon (SMAW) and is also called the SMAW-D (where D is for disposable). It was designed to fill the void in the United States Army inventory of a "bunker buster" weapon.

== Design ==
The SMAW-D operates on the principle that the recoil created by launching the rocket is counteracted by a "backblast" of gases fired from the rear of the weapon. This makes the SMAW-D inherently dangerous, especially in confined, urban areas, as is the case with all weapons of this design.

The M141 has two configurations: a carry mode in which the launcher is 812 mm (32.0 in) long, and a ready to fire mode in which the launcher is extended to its full length of 1372 mm (54.0 in).

The warhead is the same high-explosive, dual-mode (HEDM) as the USMC SMAW. It is effective against masonry, concrete walls, bunkers and lightly armored vehicles. The projectile can penetrate 20 cm (7.9 inches) of double-reinforced concrete walls, 30 cm (12 inches) of brick, up to 20 mm (0.79 inches) of rolled homogenous armor, or up to 210 cm (6.9 feet) of wood-reinforced sandbags.

The warhead is activated by a fuze in the rear of the warhead that distinguishes between hard and soft targets. On soft targets, such as sandbags, detonation is delayed until the projectile is buried in the target, producing a devastating effect. On hard targets, detonation occurs immediately on contact.

== Service history ==
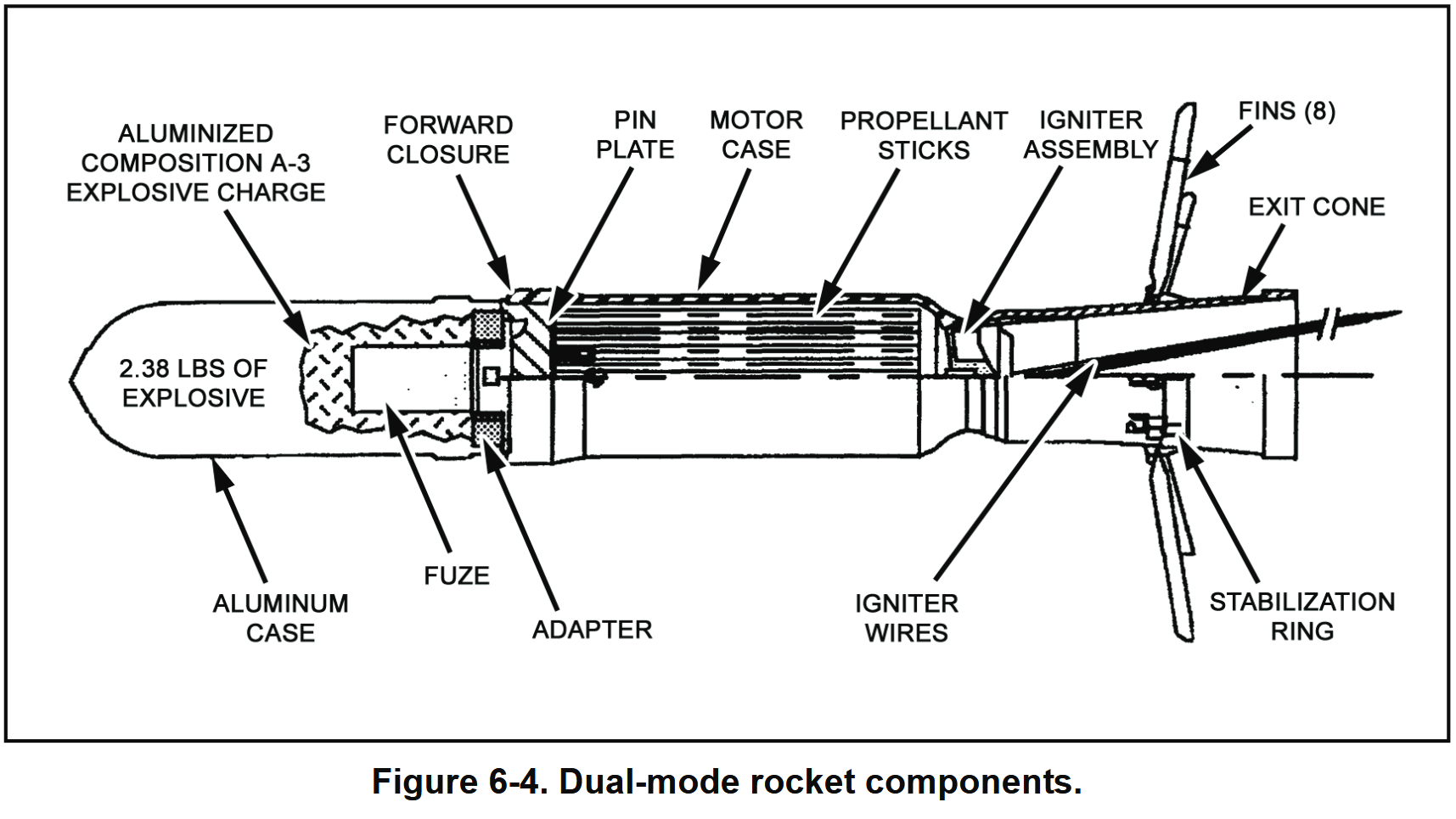
HEDM Rocket Components

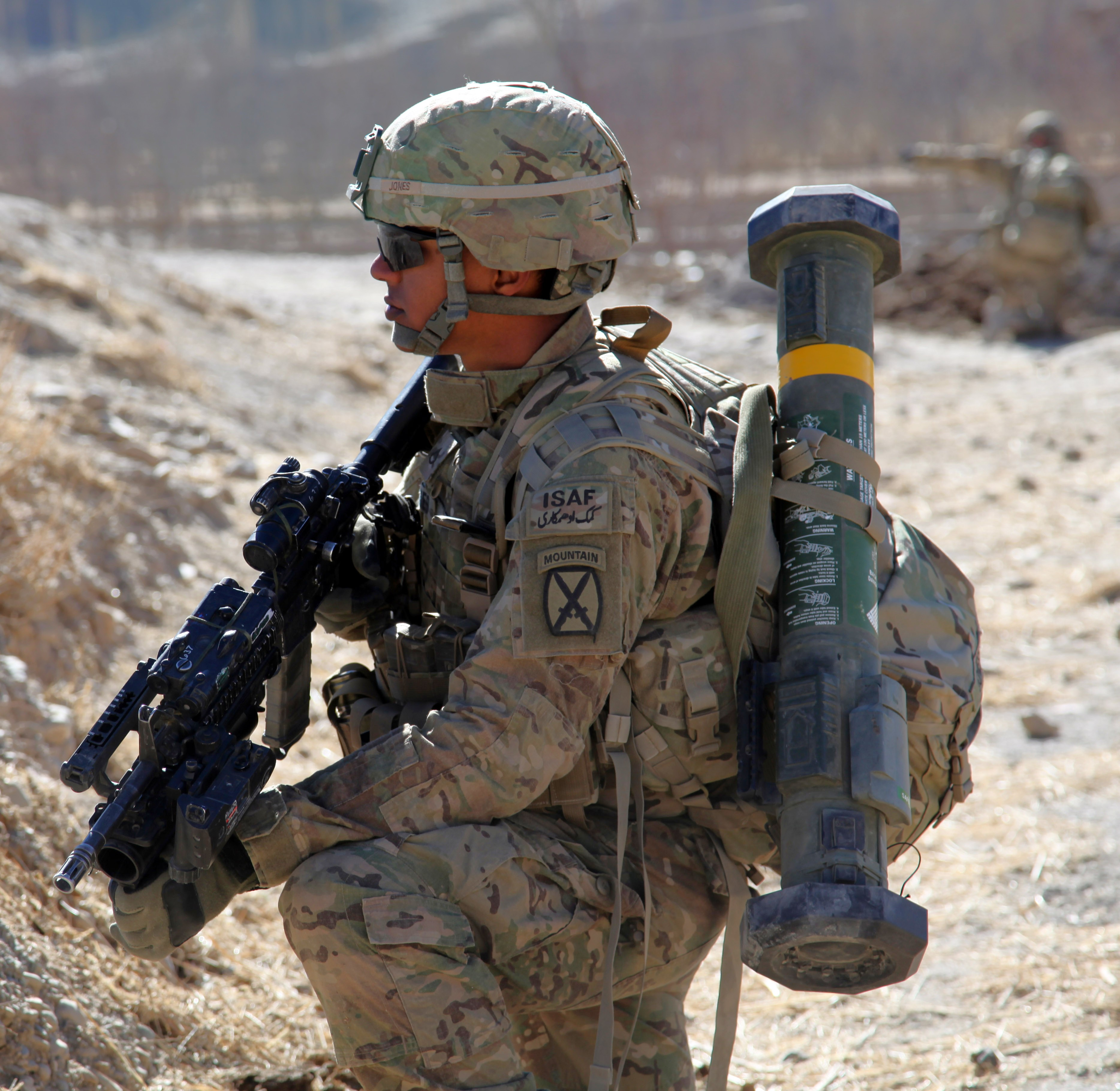
U.S. Army infantryman carrying an M141 BDM in Afghanistan, 2011

The conferees of the National Defense Authorization Act for Fiscal Year 1994 agreed that the US Army's BDM and the Marine Corps' short-range assault weapon (SRAW) were too similar to justify separate long-term projects, and that the Army should pursue an interim BDM program. Congress limited BDM procurement to 6,000 units. Two candidates were evaluated for the Army's BDM program. A candidate from McDonnell-Douglas (later Talley Defense Systems) used the same warhead as the Marine Corps SMAW, but with a rocket motor with a shorter burn time. A candidate developed by Sweden's FFV for Alliant Techsystems (later Honeywell) replaced the standard high-explosive anti-tank (HEAT) warhead of the M136 AT4 with the same dual mode warhead used by the USMC SMAW.

FFV designated the bunker buster version of the AT4 as the FFV AT8. In 1996 the McDonnell-Douglas candidate was chosen. In a unique move, the US Army ordered one batch of 1,500 then a second batch of 4,500 which were placed in contingency storage for expedited issue to units in combat. The SMAW-D was delivered to the Army in 1999.

CNN news footage showed US Army Rangers firing M141s at various fortified caves during the Tora Bora operations against the Afghan Taliban and al Qaeda, being mistaken by the CNN reporters for M136 AT4 projectiles.

Quantities of M141s were sent to the Ukrainian armed forces by the US before the invasion of Ukraine by Russia in February 2022. Since then, the missile has also been employed successfully against Russian vehicles.

== Operators ==
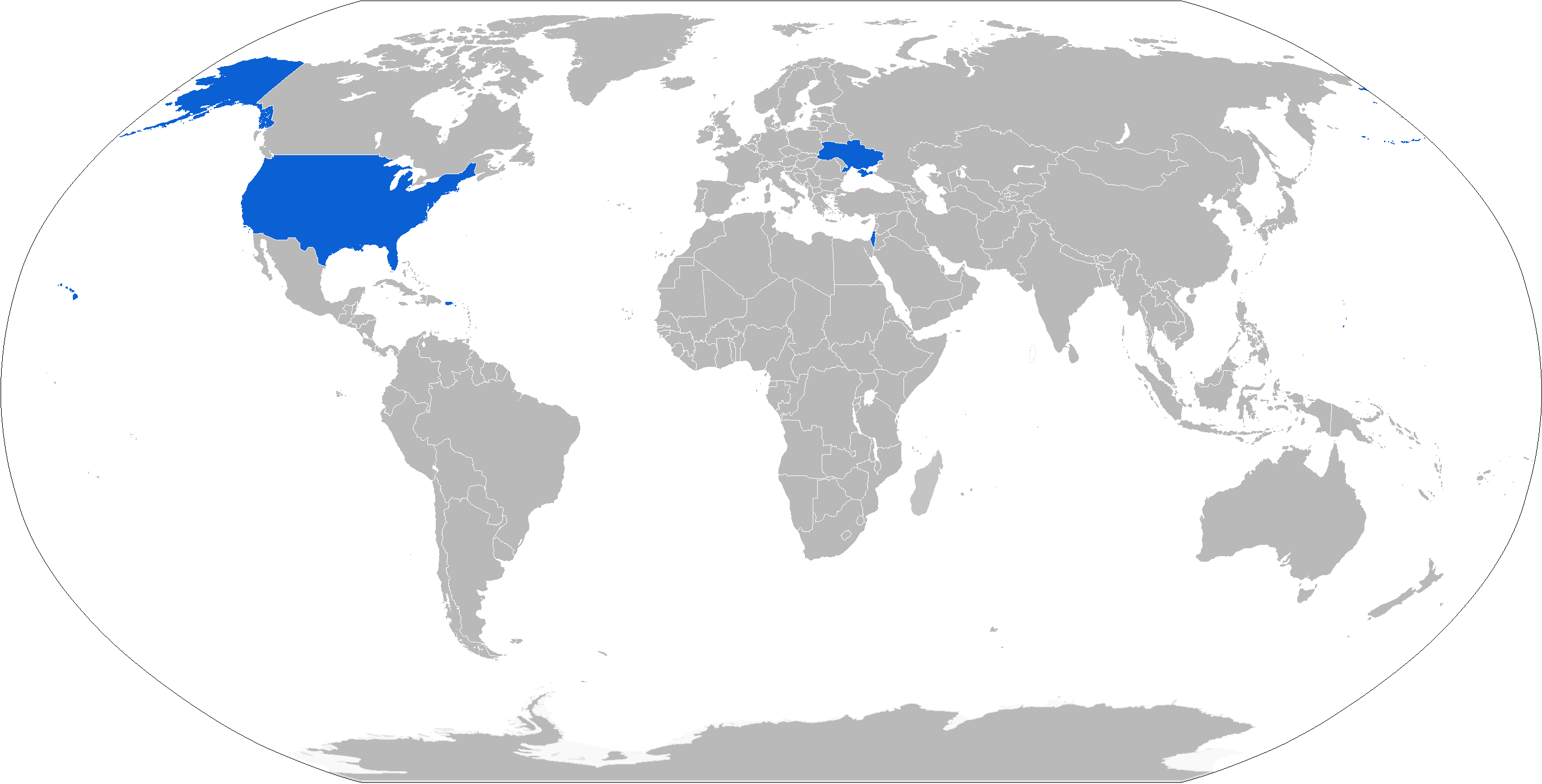
M141 operators in blue

- Ukraine: M141s were delivered amid the prelude to the Russian invasion of Ukraine.
- United States
- Israel: It was reported that the IDF was supplied with 1,800 M141s during the Gaza war.

== Gallery ==
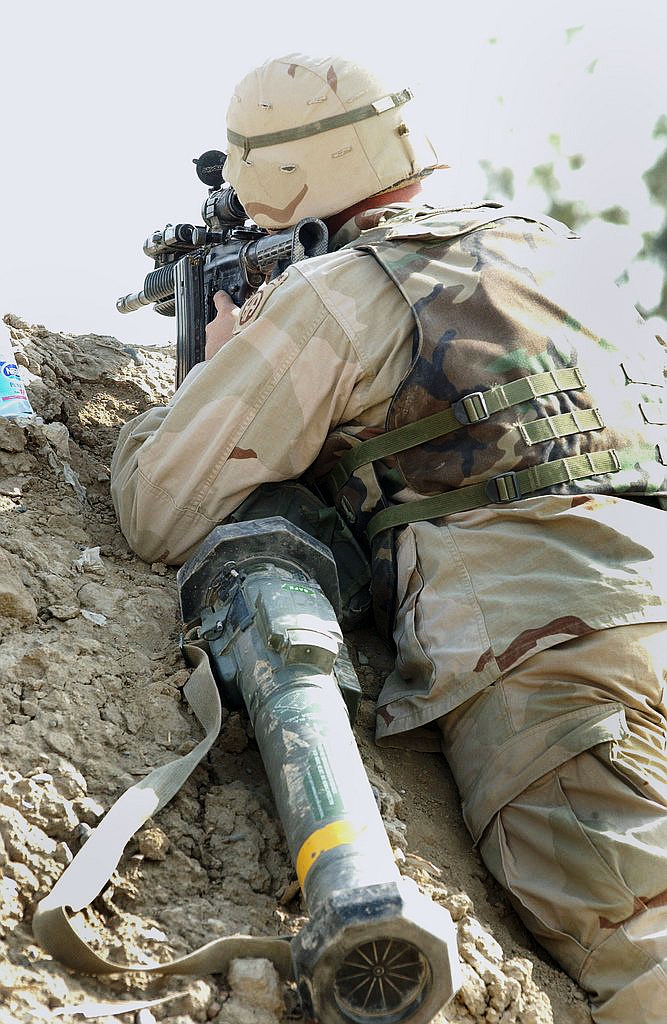
U.S. Army soldier from the 82nd Airborne Division with an M141 BDM at Camp Chapman, Afghanistan in 2002

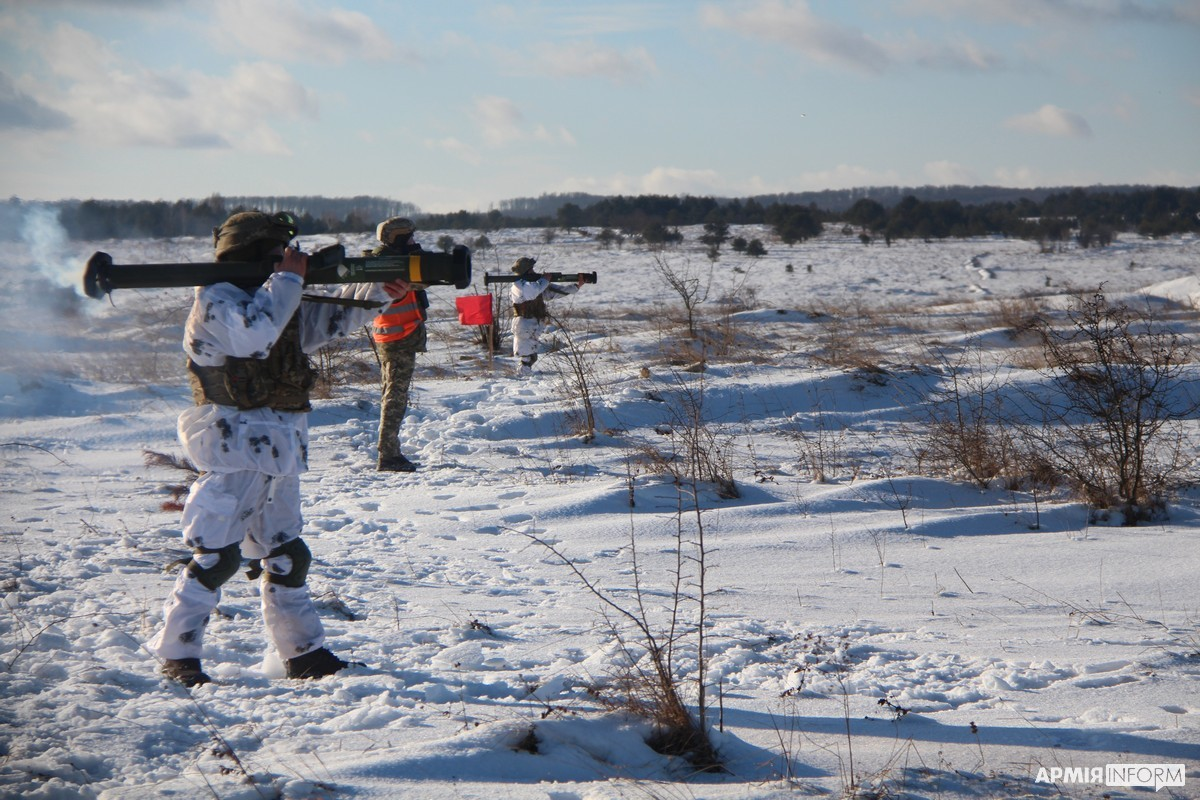
Ukrainian soldiers training with M141 in January 2022

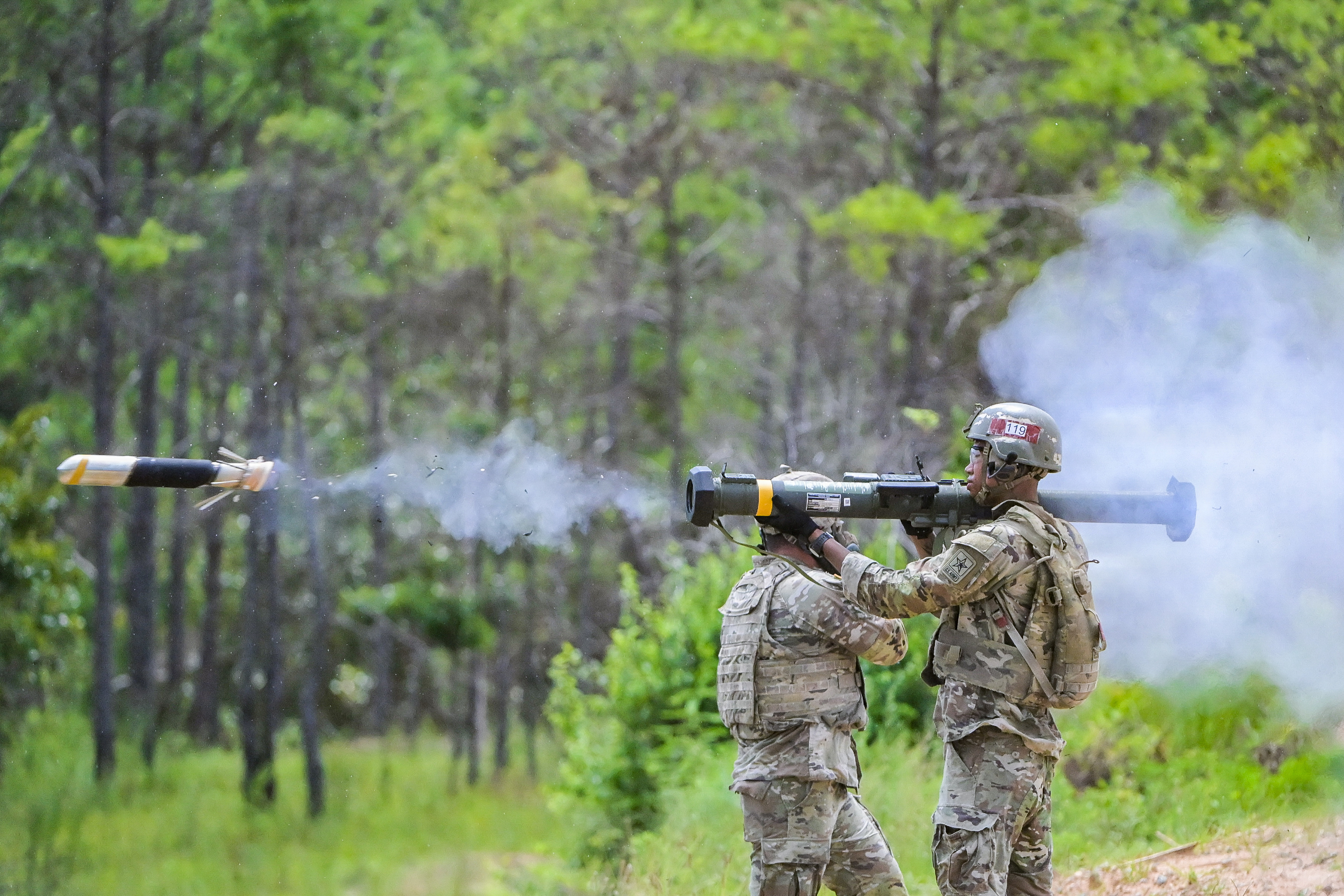
M141 BDM being fired, 2026

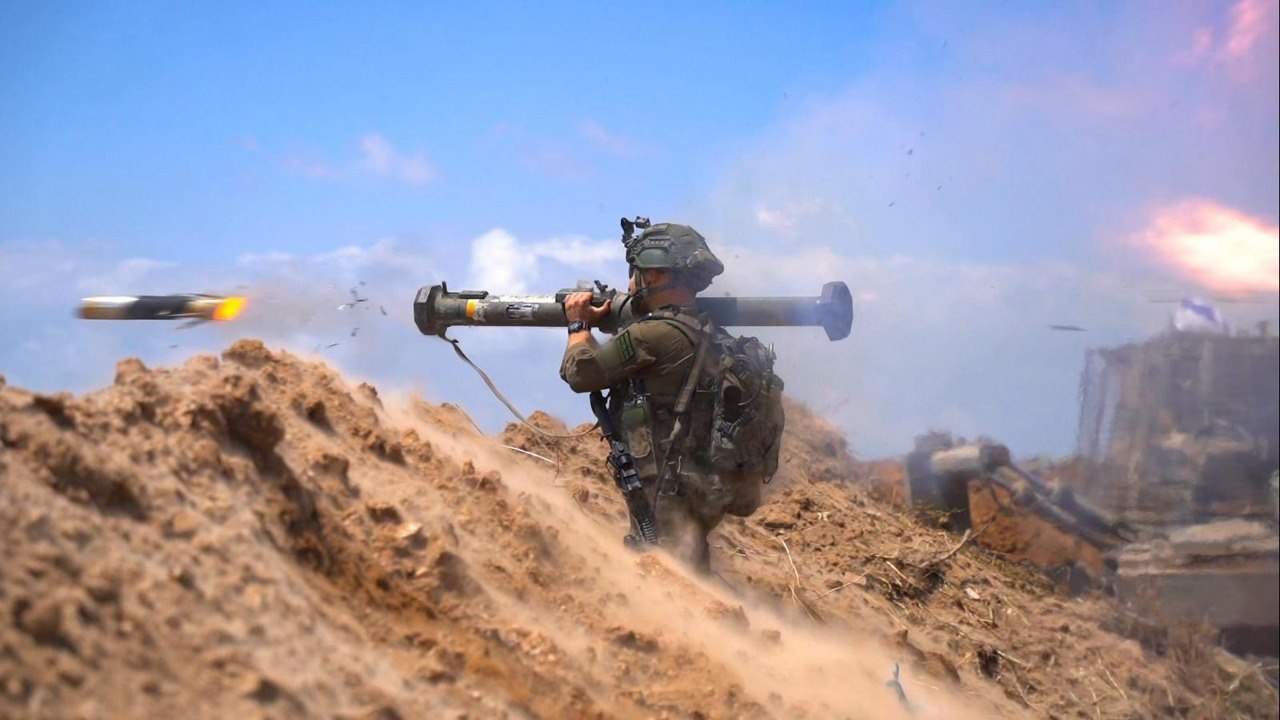
Israeli soldier firing an M141 BDM in Gaza City, April 2025

== See also ==
- List of anti-tank missiles
- List of rocket launchers
