= AN/PVS-17 =

US military miniature night vision weapon sight

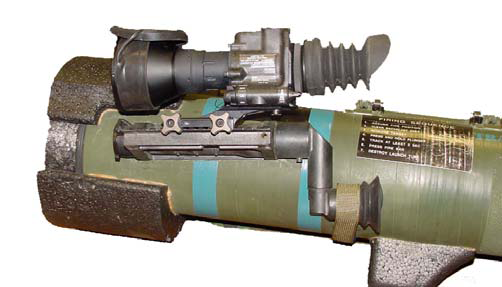
- AN/PVS-17C attached to a FGM-172 SRAW
- Type: Weapon sight
- Place of origin: United States

Service history
- In service: 2003–present
- Used by: United States
- Wars: Iraq War

Production history
- Manufacturer: L3 Technologies
- Variants: AN/PVS-17A/B (M955); AN/PVS-17C (M957)

Specifications
- Weight: 920 g (32 oz) w/ battery (PVS-17A/B); 1,360 g (48 oz) w/ battery (PVS-17C)
- Dimensions (L×H×W): 26 cm × 7.1 cm × 12.1 cm (10.2 in × 2.8 in × 4.8 in) (PVS-17A/B); 29.2 cm × 9.5 cm × 12.1 cm (11.5 in × 3.7 in × 4.8 in) (PVS-17C)
- Battery configuration: 1x AA
- Field of vision (°): 20°x17° (PVS-17A/B); 9.2° (PVS-17C)
- Range of detection: 300m (PVS-17A/B); 500m (PVS-17C)
- System zoom: 2.25x (PVS-17A/B); 4.5x (PVS-17C)
- Generation: 3
- Dioptric adjustments: +3D to -3D

The AN/PVS-17 Miniature Night Sight (MNS) is a compact, lightweight and high performance night vision weapon sight. It is in wide use by the United States Army's special forces and U.S. Marine Corps. The AN/PVS-17 is a Generation III Night Vision Device, and uses the OMNI IV MX 10160 3rd generation image intensifier tube, it can also be used as a handheld observation device.

According to the Armed Forces History Museum, the PVS-17 intensifies images for night vision sight and fits easily on a variety of weapons. The PVS-17 operates submerged in depths up to 66 ft (20 m).

In accordance with the Joint Electronics Type Designation System (JETDS), the "AN/PVS-17" designation represents the 17th design of an Army-Navy electronic device for portable visual detection equipment. The JETDS system also now is used to name all Department of Defense electronic systems.

== Variants ==
There are generally 2 variants of AN/PVS-17s; the A/B variant and the C variant. In general, the PVS-17A/B is intended to be mounted on rifles like the M16/M4, and the PVS-17C is mounted on support weapons like 5.56mm M249 Squad Automatic Weapons (SAW) and 7.62mm M240B/G General Purpose Machine Guns.

== History ==
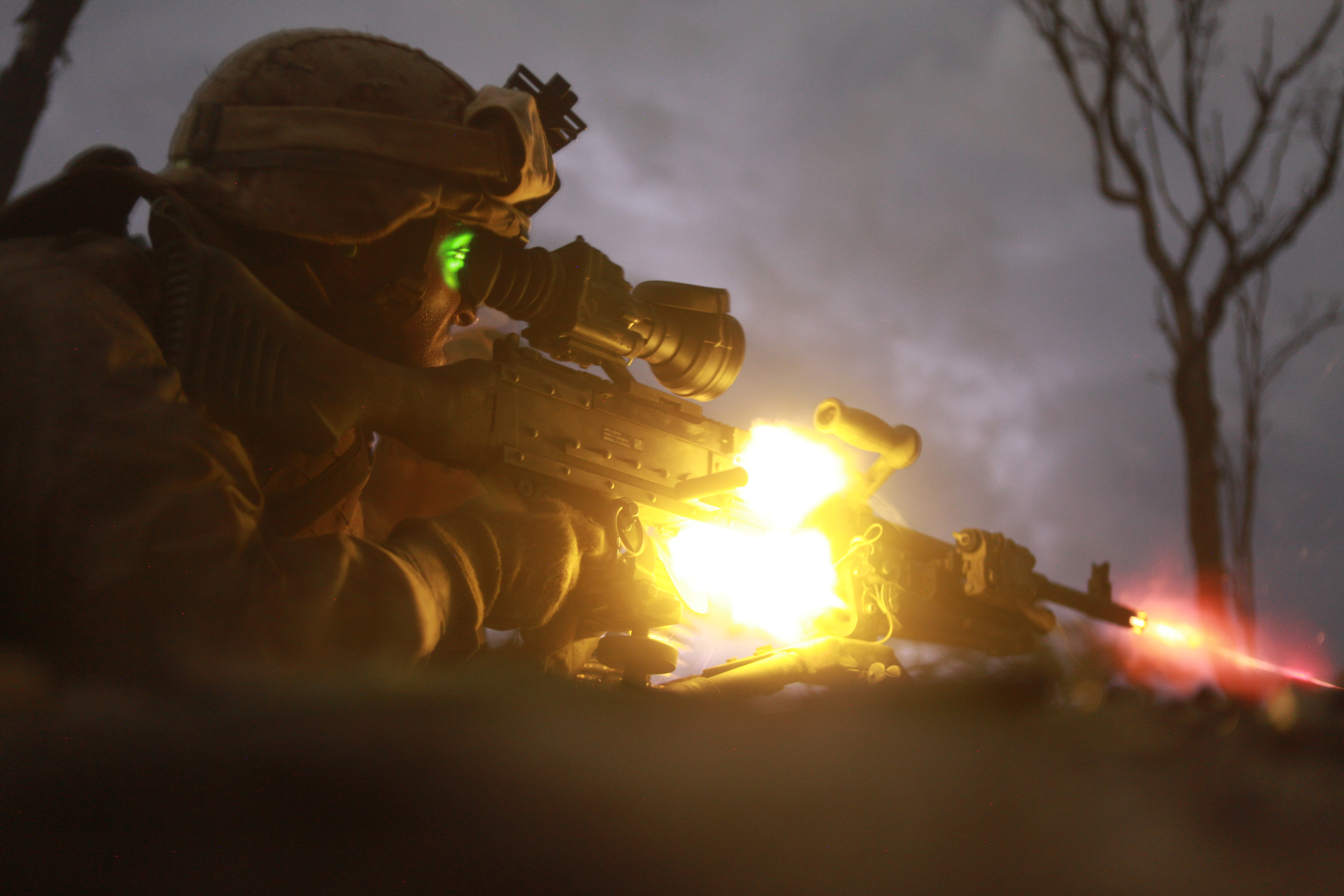
U.S. Marine firing an M240B with an AN/PVS-17C at night

PVS-17s were regarded as one of the successful systems that reached U.S. troops just before the Iraq War's Operation Iraqi Freedom (OIF) began. According to testimony by Lieutenant General Edward Hanlon Jr. before the House Armed Services Committee, Subcommittee on Tactical Air and Land Force on April 1, 2004, the Marine Corps fielded many new items of equipment and weapon systems just prior to or during the deployment of 1st Marine Expeditionary Force for OIF. Some were in response to requests from the deploying forces, and others were advance-fielded by Marine Corps Systems Command (MCSC). Most new items were positively received and were combat multipliers. Of particular significance were: The Dragon Eye unmanned aerial vehicle; the Blue Force Tracker (BFT) systems; Combat Identification (CID) Panels/ Thermal Identification Panels; and Personal Role Radios (PRR). All of these initiatives provide enhanced unit situational awareness, from squad through division. Additionally, night vision devices such as the PVS-17 enhanced lethality and situational awareness in reduced visibility.

== See also ==
- SOPMOD
- AN/PSQ-20
- AN/PVS-14
- List of military electronics of the United States
