= AN/PAS-13 =

Infrared sight used on small arms

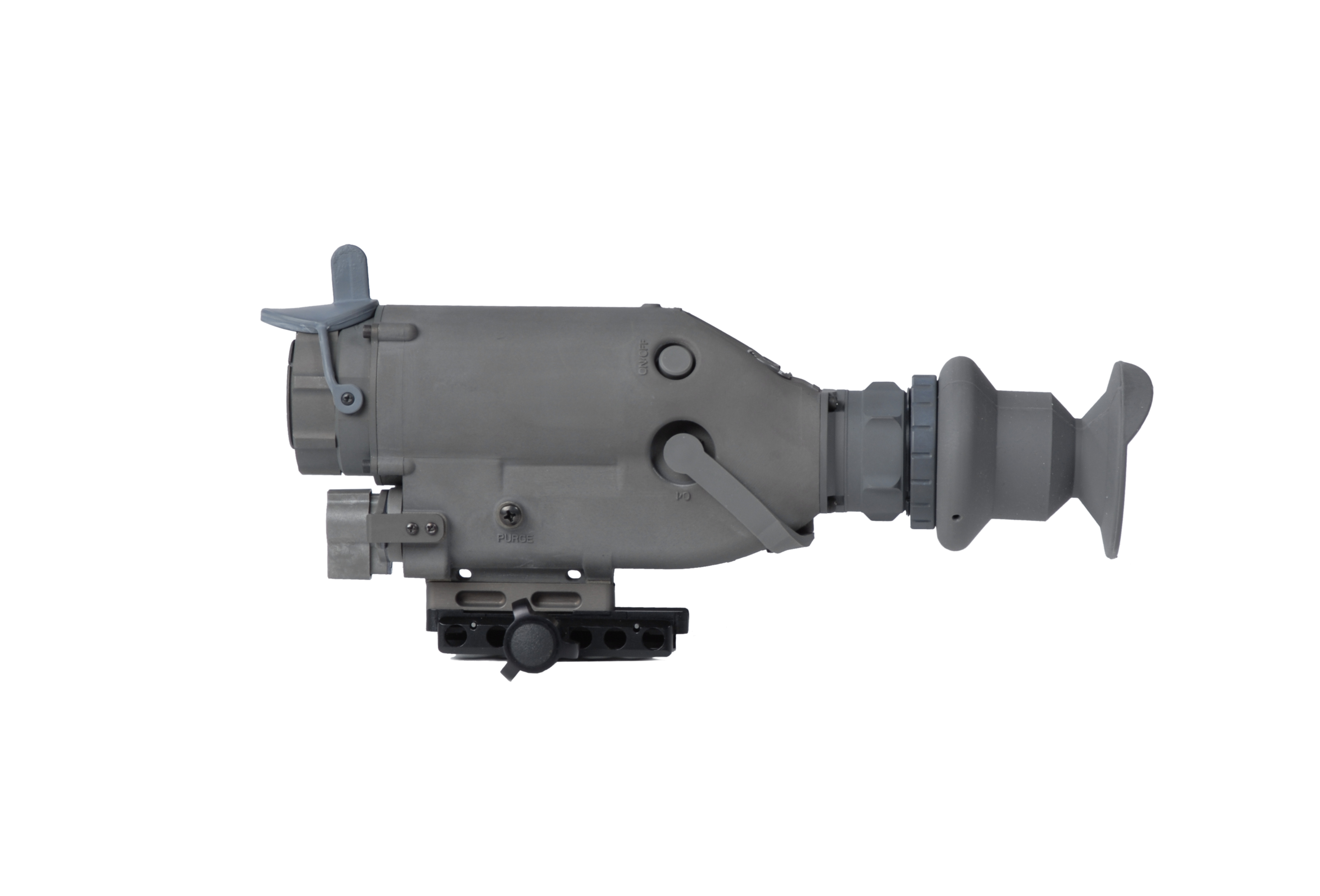
- AN/PAS-13(V)1 Light Weapon Thermal Sight (LWTS)
- Type: Scope and camera
- Place of origin: United States
- Category: Military

Production history
- Designer: Raytheon
- Manufacturer: Raytheon
- Produced: 1998 (28 years ago)
- No. built: 33,400
- Variants: Light, Medium and Heavy

Specifications
- Weight: Medium: 5 pounds (2.3 kg); Heavy: 5.5 pounds (2.5 kg)
- Dimensions (L×H×W): Medium: 15.8x6.3x6.3 inches Heavy: 18.11x6.3x6.3 inches
- Cont Operation (h): 7 hours
- Field of vision (°): Medium; Wide: 18x10.8 degrees Narrow 6x3.6 degrees Heavy; Wide: 9x5.4 degrees Narrow: 3x1.8degrees
- Range of detection: Medium; Human: 0.75 mi (1.2 km); Vehicle: 2.6 mi (4.2 km); Heavy; Human: 1.7 mi (2.8 km); Vehicle: 4.3 mi (6.9 km)
- System zoom: Medium 5x Heavy 10x

The AN/PAS-13 light weapon thermal sight (LWTS) is an infrared sight developed for the United States military by Raytheon. The sight is designed for use on small arms, but it can also be used as a standalone observation device. The AN/PAS-13 uses thermal imaging, useful in day or night while also allowing visibility through smoke or fog, which may normally obscure other night vision devices. The PAS-13 reached initial operating capability (IOC) with the U.S. Army in 1998 reaching total production of 33,400 units by 2010.

In accordance with the Joint Electronics Type Designation System (JETDS), the "AN/PAS-13" designation represents the 13th design of an Army-Navy electronic device for portable infrared detection equipment. The JETDS system now is also used to name all electronic systems and devices of entire Department of Defense and many NATO countries.

== Design and features ==
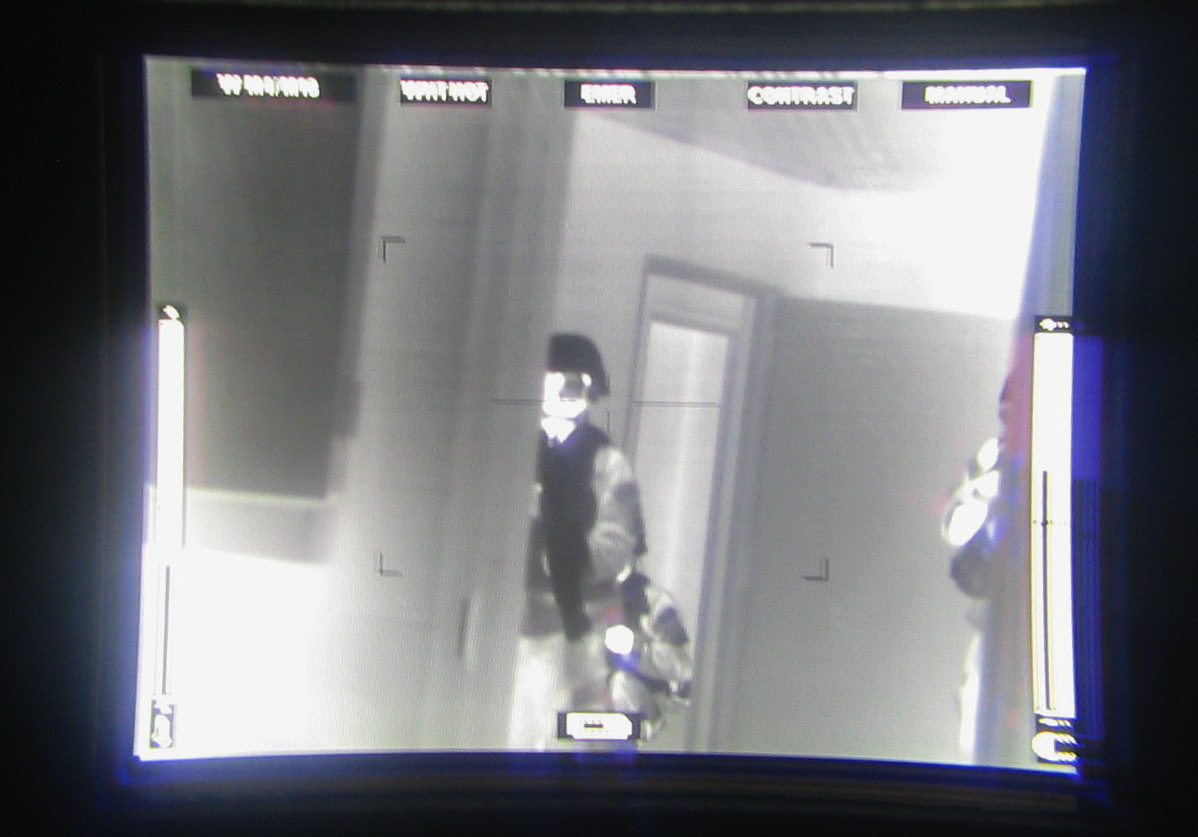
The view through an AN/PAS-13 sight

Due to the use of thermal imaging, the AN/PAS-13 does not require low levels of light to operate, and it will not shut off like most night vision devices if hit directly by high levels of light. The thermal imaging sensor within the sight requires a low temperature to operate, so a cool-down time of less than 2 minutes is required at startup.

The AN/PAS-13B comes in two variants, medium AN/PAS-13B(V)1 and heavy AN/PAS-13B(V)2. The medium has a smaller telescope attached resulting in a zoom of 5x compared to the heavy's 10x. Both AN/PAS-13Bs have programmable reticles allowing the user to match the reticle to the weapon system on which the sight will be mounted. Some reticles provided in the sight include those designed for the M16 rifle, M4 carbine, M60 machine gun, M240 machine gun, M249 Squad Automatic Weapon, M2 machine gun, Mk 19 grenade launcher, Mk 47 Striker, M24 sniper weapon system, and the GAU-21.

The sight includes a multi-function I/O port allowing video to be recorded or viewed from a location other than the eyepiece. When using the eyepiece, the rubber cup surrounding it must be depressed slightly to engage the display and cooling mechanism.

The image displayed for the user is black and white. The user has the ability to select whether white or black will represent hotter objects by selecting "black hot" or "white hot". AN/PAS-13Bs are powered by standard military disposable or rechargeable lithium-ion batteries.

== New variants ==
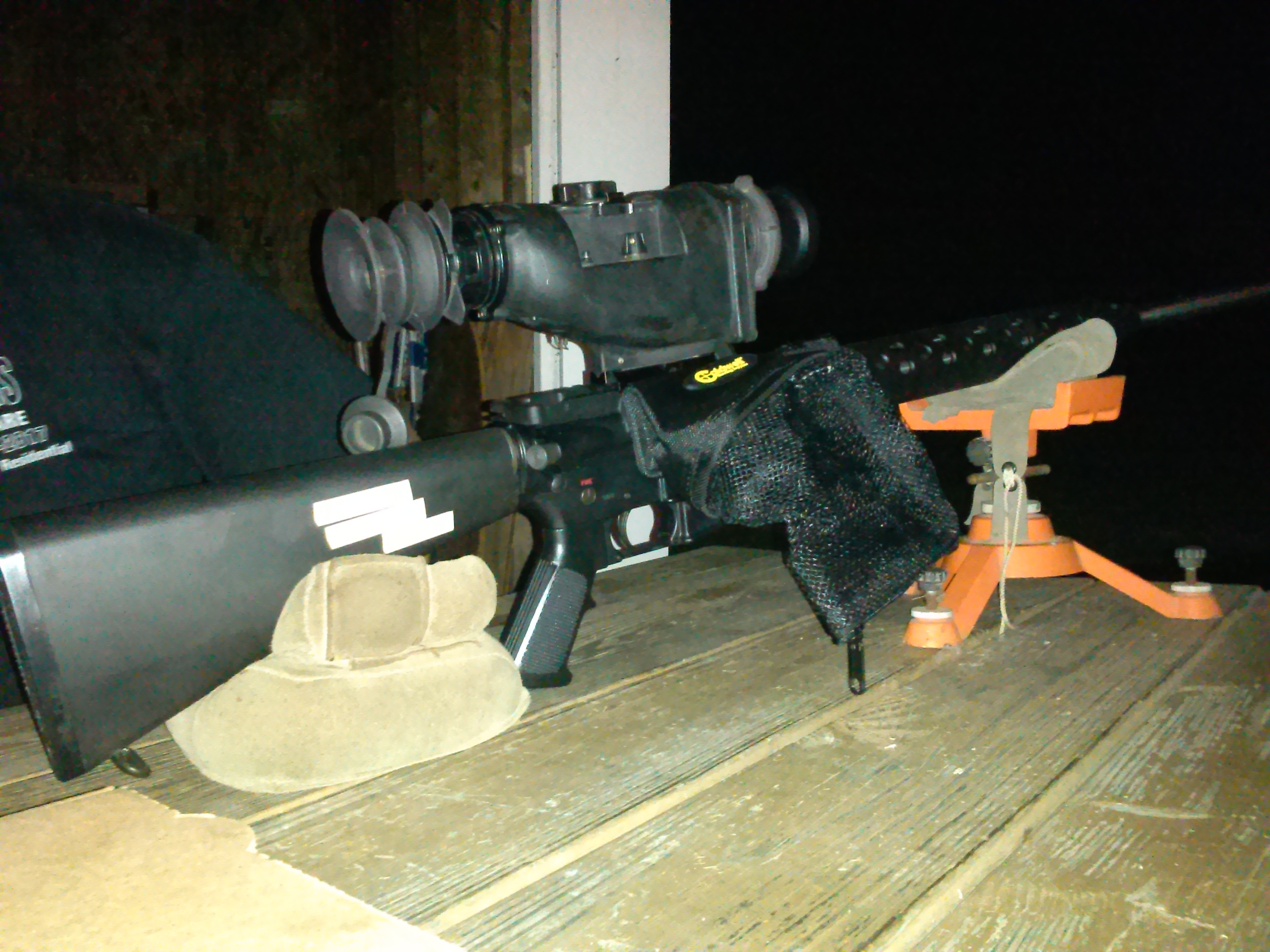
AN/PAS-13 Ver. 2 mounted on an AR-15 with a brass catcher

In November 2006, three new versions of the AN/PAS-13 were ordered by the U.S. military. The Thermal Weapon Sights II include three new versions, a Light, Medium, and Heavy. All three models weigh less than the originals, weighing 1.8 lb (0.82 kg), 2.8 lb (1.3 kg) and 3.9 lb (1.8 kg) respectively. This reduction in weight and size is due to improvements in the sensors, as well as the ability to run the sights without being cooled. The Medium and Heavy models maintain zooms of 5× and 10×, while the Light model has a zoom of 1.55× and a FOV of 15 degrees. All three models are powered by lithium AA batteries, with the Light version having a battery life of 5 hours, the Medium and Heavy 6.5. The US Armed Forces designate version 2 as MTWS (Medium Thermal Weapon Sight), and version 3 as HTWS (Heavy Thermal Weapon Sight).

A new variant, the AN/PAS-13G LWTS model, is much smaller and compact making it easier to use on the M16/M4 family of rifles. It is also designed to be used with the Advanced Combat Optical Gunsight (ACOG), and M68 Close Combat Optic.

== See also ==
- List of military electronics of the United States
- Joint Electronics Type Designation System – Unclassified designation system for United States military electronic equipment
