= Armed Forces History Museum =

- Established: August 2008
- Dissolved: 29 January 2017
- Location: Largo, Florida
- Coordinates: 27°53′55.11″N 82°45′7.66″W
- Key holdings: Replica Bell X-1
- Collection size: Over 100,000
- Website: armedforcesmuseum.com

The Armed Forces History Museum (AFHM) was a 501(c)(3), non-profit museum in the city of Largo in the Tampa Bay region of Florida, United States. The museum opened in August 2008, with 35,000 sq. ft. of indoor displays and an additional 15,000 sq. ft. of outdoor viewing space. The AFHM housed historical memorabilia including fully restored, fully operational jeeps, tanks, halftracks and armor. The museum also had a large replica of Chuck Yeager's Supersonic Jet Bell X1, the aircraft he used to break the sound barrier. The museum closed permanently on January 29, 2017.

== History ==
In 1955, John J. Piazza, Sr. was given a World War I grenade. Over time he collected other items, including military vehicles and several cases of memorabilia and ordnance, and in 1996 Piazza put together a traveling exhibit to take to local schools and community events. In order to receive donations from the public, Piazza established his collection as The Armed Forces Military Museum, with a 501 (c)(3), non-profit status.

The Armed Forces Military Museum opened to the public on August 15, 2008. In 2012, the museum changed its name to The Armed Forces History Museum.

Also in 2012 the museum began holding various special events to serve as fundraisers.

The museum housed over 100,000 items of military history.

== Museum displays ==
The museum was divided into several display areas. Large pieces, including aircraft, field pieces and tanks, were on display both indoors and in an outdoor area. The Salute to Service gallery focused on uniforms and insignia. The Firearms and Ordnance gallery displayed hand weapons of many vintages. A diorama of a World War I trench filled one area, while the Pearl Harbor and the South Pacific gallery included scale models, Japanese artifacts, Marine Corps memorabilia and World War II film footage.

Some of the other displays included the US Navy Deck, the D-Day Landing/Utah Beach, a French Village/St. Mere Eglise, a German Farmhouse, a World War II Communications Headquarters, the Korean War Inchon Landing, a Korean War MASH, a diorama entitled Korean War Frozen Chosin, Korean War's Rosie’s Bar, a POW/MIA gallery, a Vietnam War – Ho Chi Minh Trail diorama, and an Officers’ Club.
