= Explosives engineering =

Field of study in explosive materials

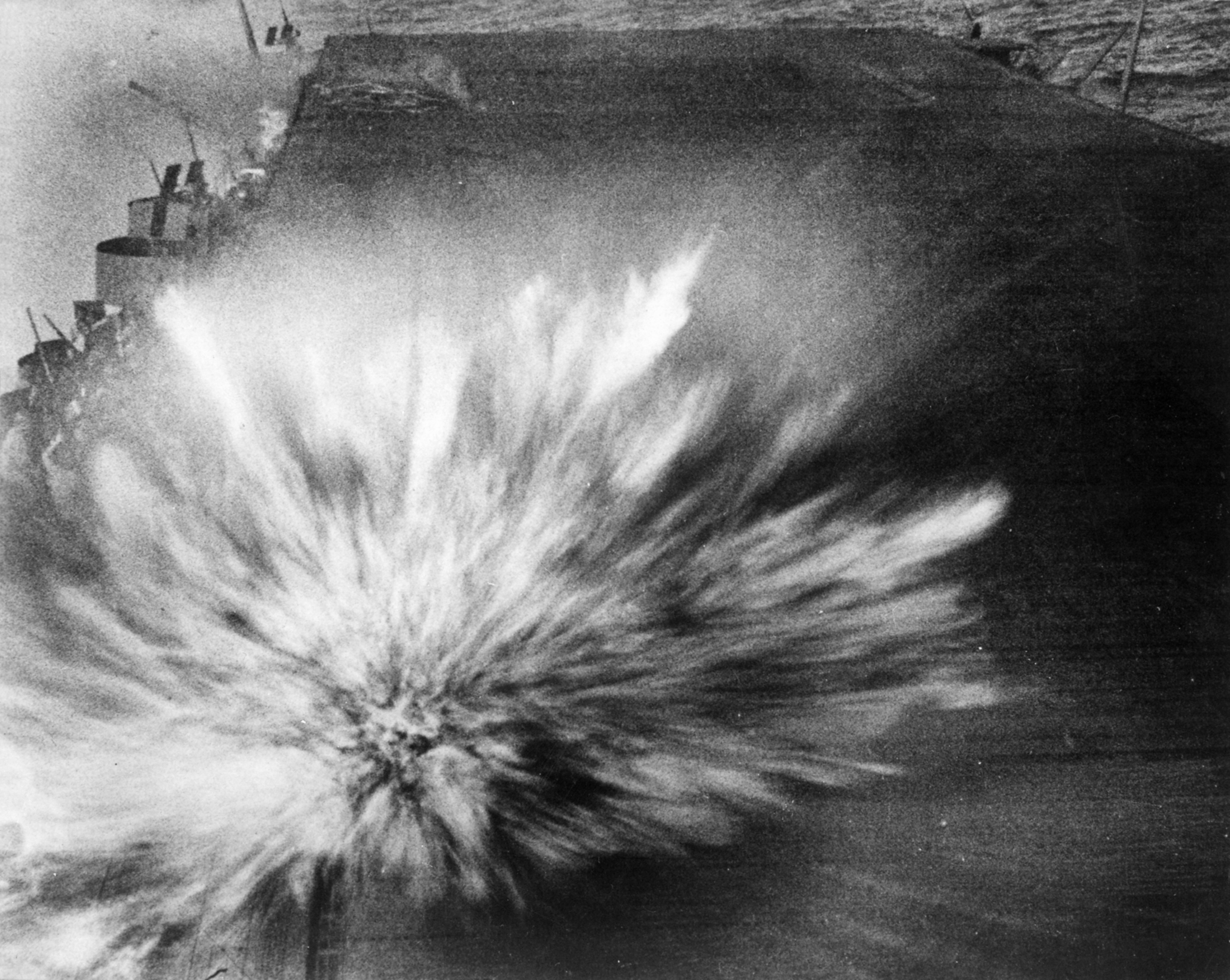
A Japanese bomb hitting the USS Enterprise (CV-6) flight deck during the Battle of the Eastern Solomons, 1942.

Explosives engineering is the field of science and engineering which is related to examining the behavior and usage of explosive materials.

== Topics ==
Some of the topics that explosives engineers' study, research, and work on include:

- Development and characterization of new explosive materials in various forms
- Analysis of the physical process of detonation
- Explosive generated shock waves and their effects on materials
- Safety testing of explosives
- Analysis and engineering of rock blasting for mining
- Design and analysis of shaped charges and reactive armor
- Design, analysis and application of military explosives such as grenades, mines, shells, aerial bombs, missile warheads, etc.
- Bomb disposal
- Drilling and blasting
- Demolition

== Organizations ==
- Institute of Makers of Explosives
- International Society of Explosives Engineers (ISEE)
- Missouri University of Science and Technology
- New Mexico Institute of Mining and Technology (New Mexico Tech)

== In popular culture ==
The film The Hurt Locker follows an Iraq War Explosive Ordnance Disposal team who are targeted by insurgents and shows their psychological reactions to the stress of combat.

== See also ==
- Explosives
- Chapman–Jouguet condition
- Chemistry
- Civil engineer
- Chemical engineer
- Gurney equations
- Material science
- Physics
- Drilling and blasting
