= Ronald Wilfrid Gurney =

British theoretical physicist (1898–1953)

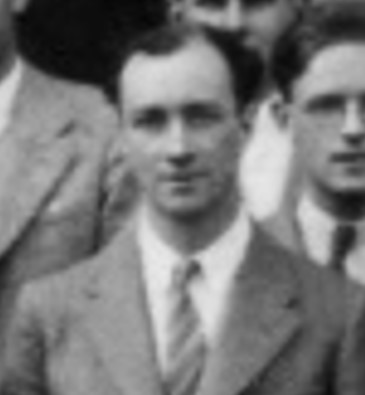
- Ronald Gurney at Bristol University (c. 1935)

Personal details
- Born: July 1, 1898 Cheltenham, Gloucestershire, England.
- Died: April 14, 1953 (aged 54) New York, New York, U.S.
- Education: Cambridge University (BS, PhD)
- Scientific career
- Known for: Quantum tunneling theory of alpha decay Theory of latent image formation in photography Theory of F-center formation in ionic solids Theoretical electrochemistry Theory of solutions and target of McCarthyism
- Spouse(s): Natalie (Nalinka, Natalia) Kouteinikoff (m. 1934)
- Fields: Physics, theoretical physics, solid-state physics, electrochemistry, ionic solutions,electron tunneling
- Workplaces: Cambridge University; Princeton University; Institute of Physical and Chemical Research, Tokyo Manchester University; Bristol University; University of Stockholm; Columbia University Aberdeen Proving Grounds Argonne National Lab Johns Hopkins University University of Maryland
- Thesis: (1926)
- Doctoral advisor: Ernest Rutherford

Ronald Wilfrid Gurney (1 July 1898 – 14 April 1953) was a British theoretical, solid-state, and chemical physicist and research pupil of Ernest Rutherford at the Cavendish Laboratory in Cambridge University during the 1920s. He moved to Princeton University in 1926-1928 on a International Education Board and Commonwealth Fund fellowship from the Rockefeller Foundation to work with Karl Compton. He was granted a Japanese research fellowship to work at the Institute of Physical and Chemical Research for 1929. Upon returning to England in 1930, he first worked as a researcher at Cambridge University and then moved to the University of Manchester as a teaching fellow. He was appointed as a George Wills Research Associateship at Bristol University in 1933 and worked with Nevill Mott. He moved to the US after the start of World War II, where he died in New York City.

He was born in Cheltenham in 1898.

== Radioactive decay processes ==
Whilst at the Palmer Physical Laboratory at Princeton University from 1926 to 1928, he discovered alpha decay via quantum tunnelling, together with Edward Condon and independently of George Gamow. In the early 1900s, radioactive materials were known to have characteristic exponential decay rates or half lives. At the same time, radiation emissions were known to have certain characteristic energies. By 1928, Gamow had solved the theory of the alpha decay of a nucleus via quantum tunnelling and the problem was also solved independently by Gurney and Condon.

== Contributions to solid-state physics ==
Gurney contributed to the understanding of the formation of latent image formation on photographic plates and the theory of color centers or F-centers in ionic solids in collaboration with Nevill Mott.

Mott and Gurney's book Electronic Processes in Ionic Crystals was published ni 1940 during World War II and influenced a generation of solid-state physicists.

== Books ==
- Elementary Quantum Mechanics, Cambridge University Press, 1934.
- Ions in Solution, Cambridge University Press, 1936.
- Electronic Processes in Ionic Crystals, Oxford University Press, 1940 (with N.F. Mott)
- Introduction to Statistical Mechanics, McGraw-Hill Book Co., New York, 1949.
- Ionic Processes in Solution, McGraw-Hill, New York, 1953.

== See also ==
- Mott–Gurney law
- Gurney equations
- Gamow factor
