= Drilling jumbo =

Rock drilling machine

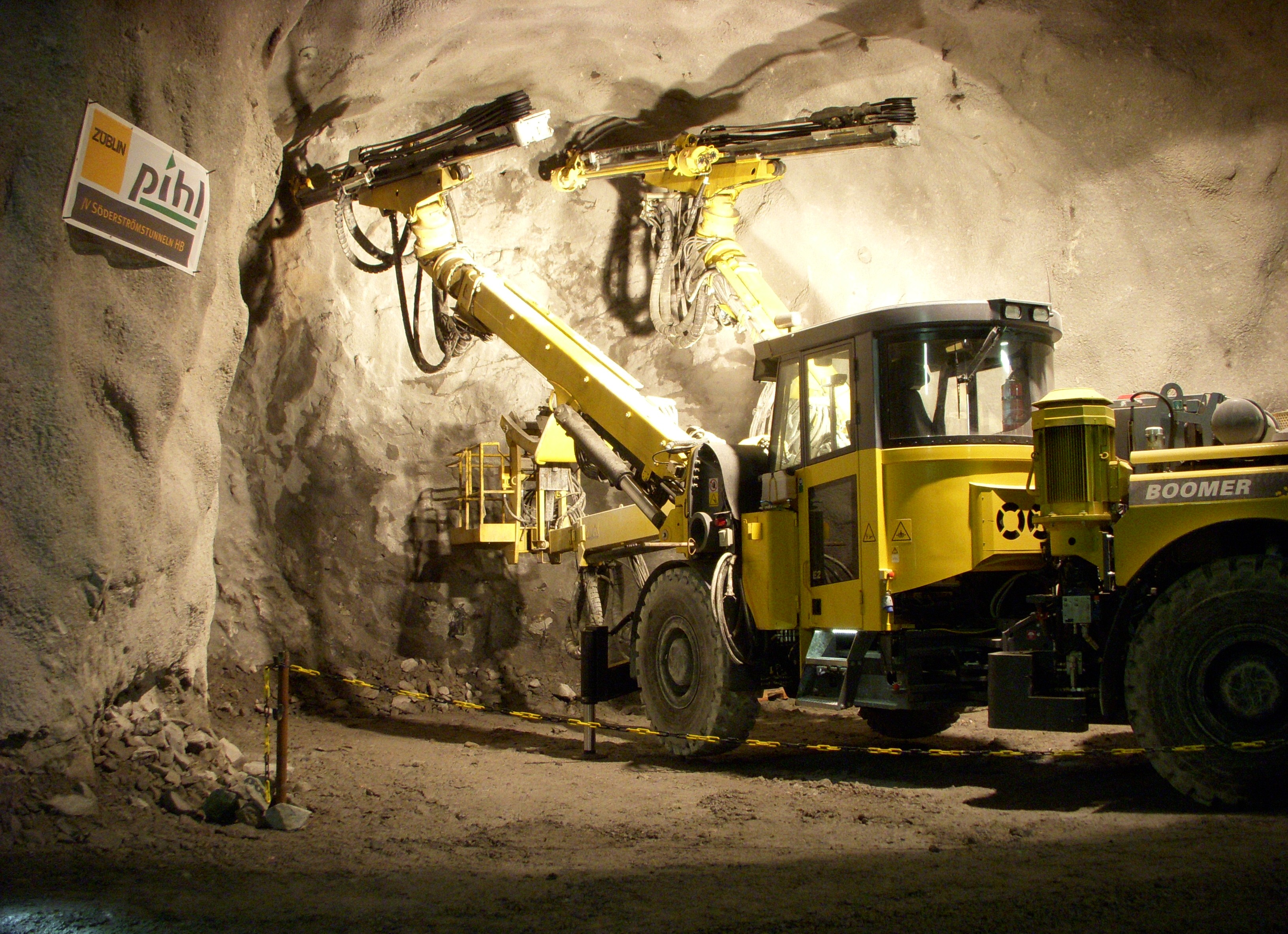
An Epiroc Boomer

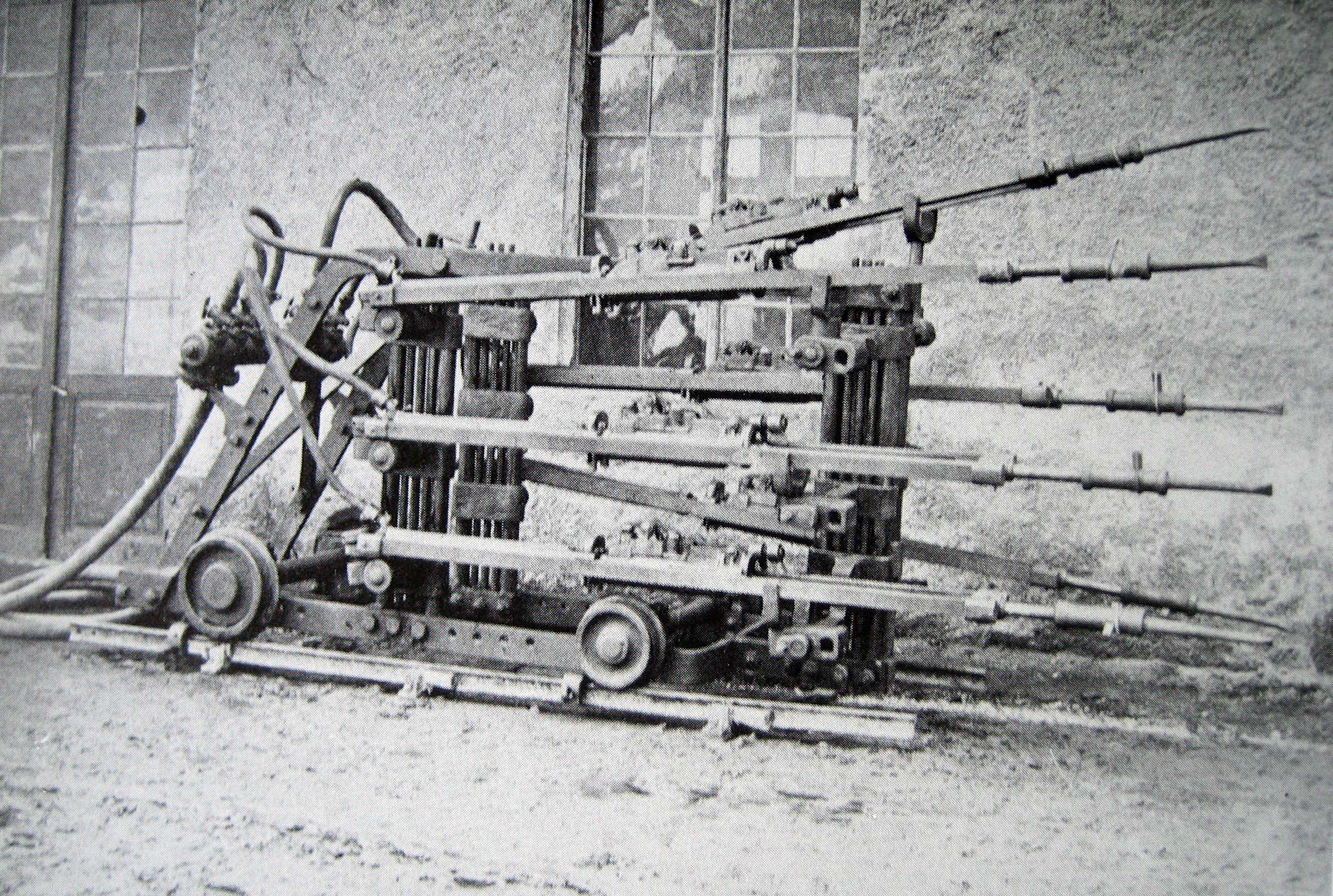
historical 6-armed air-powered drilling jumbo on rails

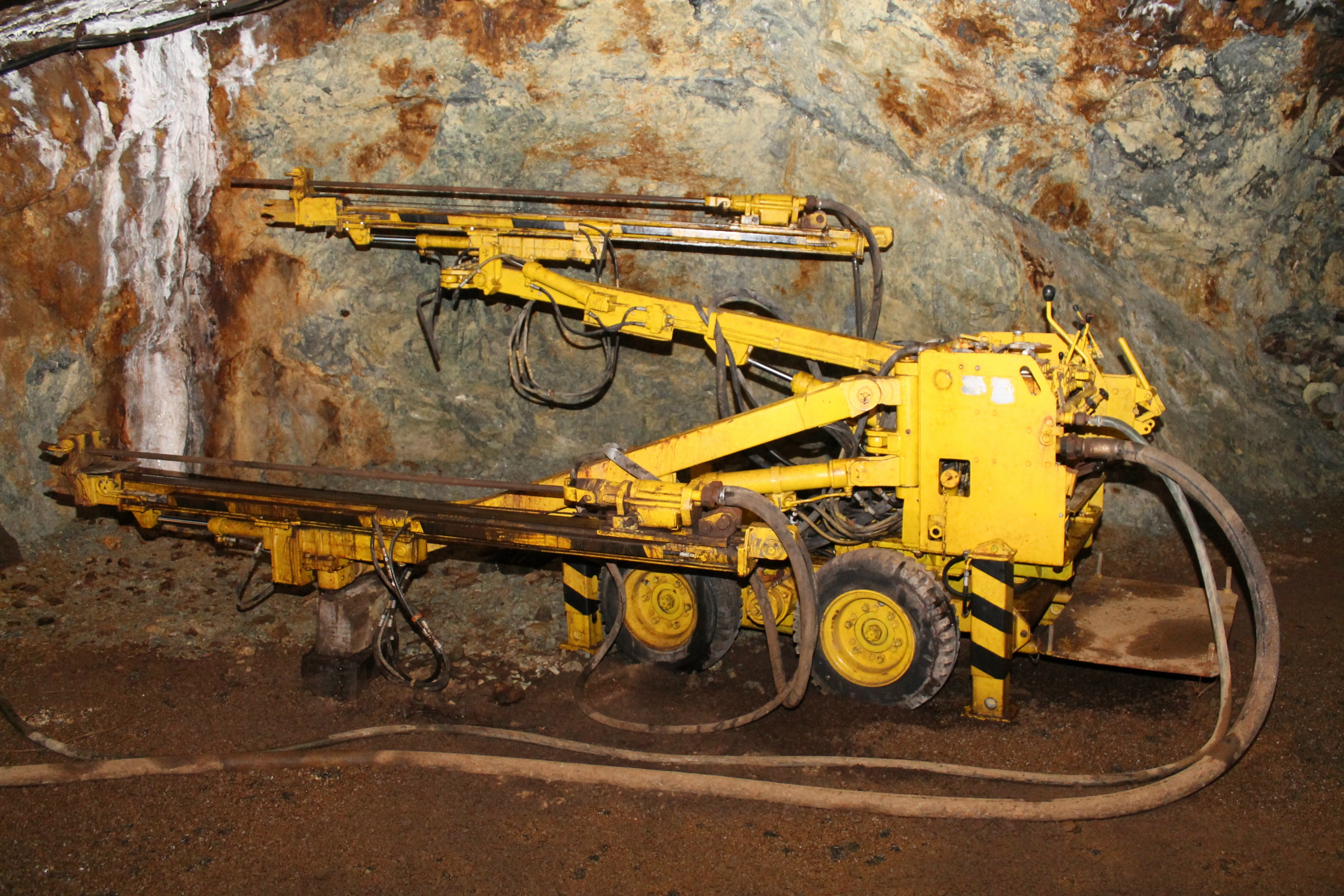
small 2-armed air-powered drilling jumbo

A Drilling jumbo or drill jumbo is a rock drilling machine.

== Use ==
Drilling jumbos are usually used in underground mining, if mining is done by drilling and blasting. They are also used in tunnelling, if rock hardness prevents use of tunnelling machines. It is considered as a powerful tool to facilitate labor-intensive process for mineral extraction.

== Description ==
A drilling jumbo consists of one, two or three rock drill carriages, sometimes a platform, which the miner stands on to load the holes with explosives, clear the face of the tunnel or do something else. The carriages are bolted onto the chassis, which supports the miner's cabin as well as the engine. Although modern drilling jumbos are relatively large, there are smaller ones for use in cramped conditions. Whereas modern jumbos are usually fitted with rubber tires and diesel-powered, there are also exist variants with steel wheels, to ride on rails and even single carriage sled-mounted ones. Electric power is also common, and historic jumbos were powered by compressed air. Electricity and compressed air produce little to no exhaust gases, which is preferable if work is done in smaller tunnels where good ventilation is difficult. The drilling jumbo was invented in 1849 by J.J Couch of Philadelphia.

== How the Jumbo Works ==
The main body of the Jumbo has two or a maximum of three drilling rigs, a basket, and a movable roof that moves vertically, and four jacks are installed in its four corners to stabilize it during drilling and prevent it from changing the drilling angle. Its movement system is carried out by two axles with rubber wheels.

The rigs include rails and a motor to move the hammer. The hammers operate hydraulically and drill with continuous rotation and blows, and high-pressure water is used to remove the soil from the excavation. The length of the rig varies and is about 3.5 meters.

A basket rig is installed on a rig to access the drilled holes, measure them, and set the cost for explosion.

All drilling systems, including the hammer, movement motors, and jacks used in the Jumbo Drill, operate hydraulically. To perform this operation, hydraulic pumps are used, the number of which varies depending on the dimensions and number of rigs of the machine. In jumbo drills, the driving force of the hydraulic pumps is provided by electric motors and diesel engines. An operator is required for each rig to guide the machine and drill with it.

For tunnels with a high percentage of collapse, the explosive drilling method with this machine is not suitable and rotary machines are used instead.
