= Drilling and blasting =

Excavation method using explosives

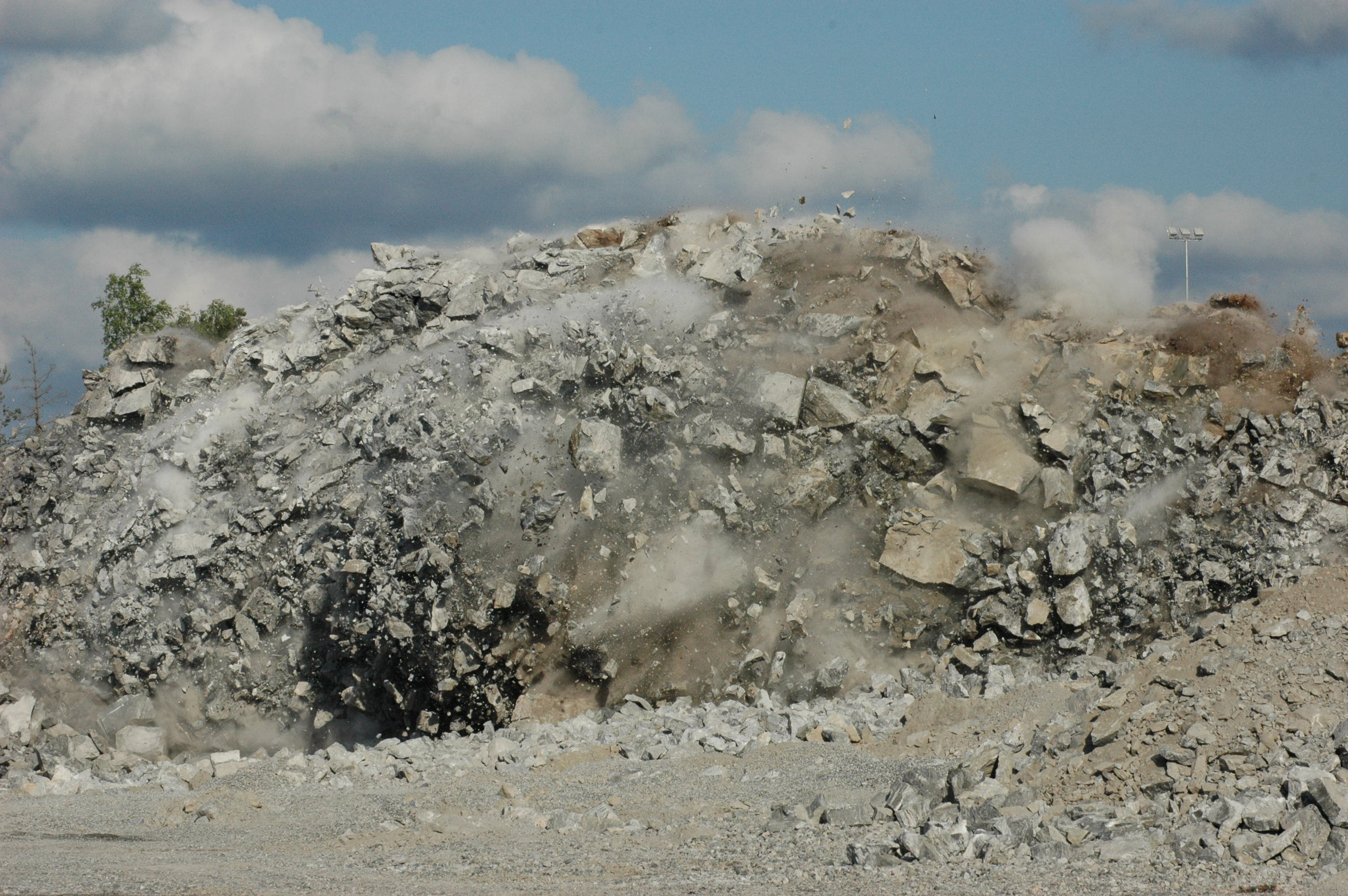
Rock blasting in Finland

Drilling and blasting is the controlled use of explosives and other methods, such as gas pressure blasting pyrotechnics, to break rock for excavation. It is practiced most often in mining, quarrying and civil engineering such as dam, tunnel or road construction. The result of rock blasting is often known as a rock cut.

Drilling and blasting currently utilizes many different varieties of explosives with different compositions and performance properties. Higher velocity explosives are used for relatively hard rock in order to shatter and break the rock, while low velocity explosives are used in soft rocks to generate more gas pressure and a greater heaving effect. For instance, an early 20th-century blasting manual compared the effects of black powder to that of a wedge, and dynamite to that of a hammer. The most commonly used explosives in mining today are ANFO based blends due to lower cost than dynamite.

Before the advent of tunnel boring machines (TBMs), drilling and blasting was the only economical way of excavating long tunnels through hard rock, where digging is not possible. Even today, the method is still used in the construction of tunnels, such as in the construction of the Lötschberg Base Tunnel. The decision whether to construct a tunnel using a TBM or using a drill and blast method includes a number of factors. Tunnel length is a key issue that needs to be addressed because large TBMs for a rock tunnel have a high capital cost, but because they are usually quicker than a drill and blast tunnel the price per metre of tunnel is lower. This means that shorter tunnels tend to be less economical to construct with a TBM and are therefore usually constructed by drill and blast. Managing ground conditions can also have a significant effect on the choice with different methods suited to different hazards in the ground.

== History ==
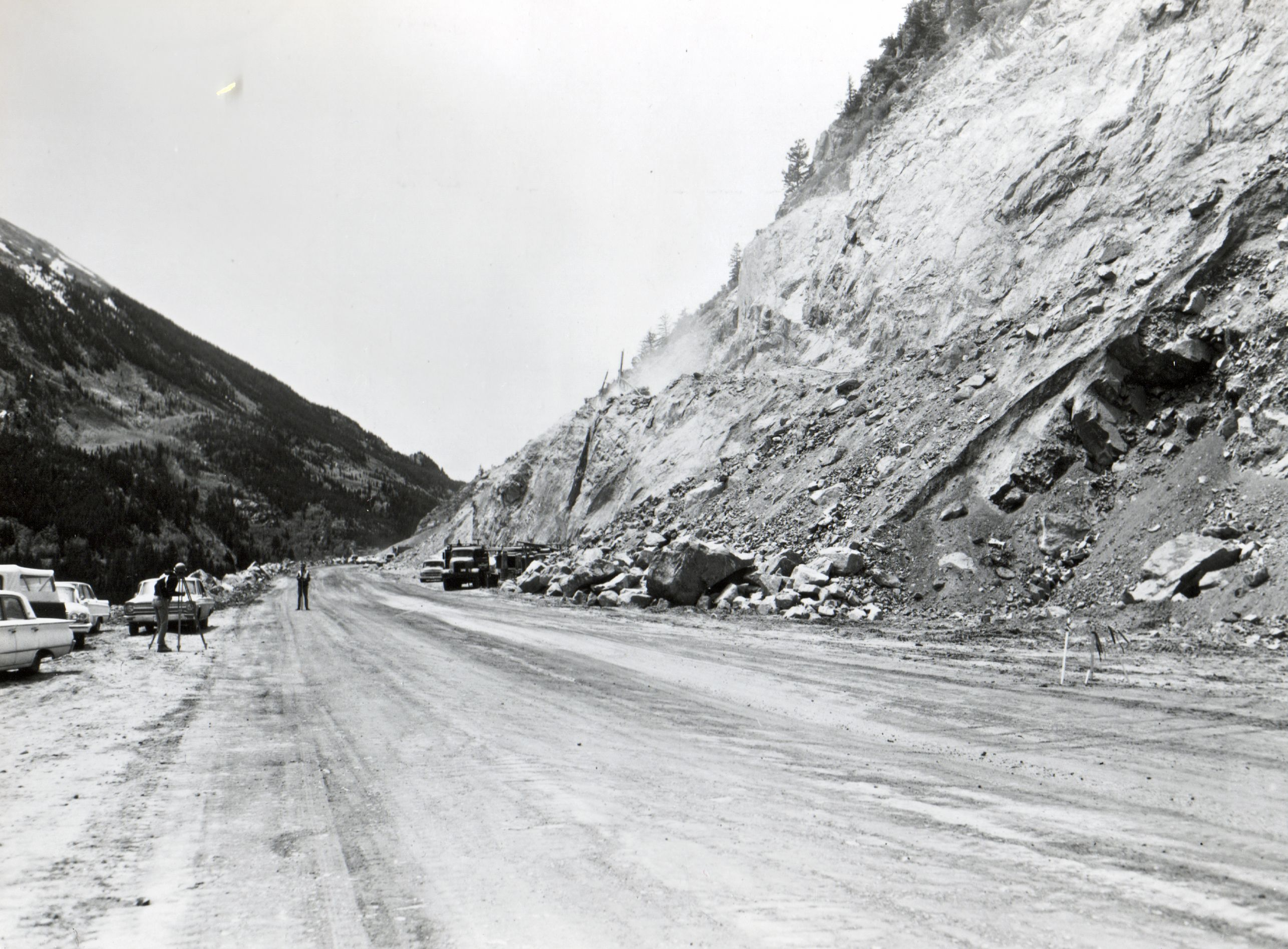
Rock blasting during the construction of Interstate 70, 1967

The use of explosives in mining goes back to the year 1627, when gunpowder was first used in place of mechanical tools in the Hungarian (now Slovak) town of Banská Štiavnica. The innovation spread quickly throughout Europe and the Americas.

The standard method for blasting rocks was to drill a hole to a considerable depth and deposit a charge of gunpowder at the further end of the hole and then fill the remainder of the hole with clay or some other soft mineral substance, well rammed, to make it as tight as possible. A wire laid in the hole during this process was then removed and replaced with a train of gunpowder. This train was ignited by a slow match, often consisting simply of brown paper smeared with grease, intended to burn long enough to allow the person who fires it enough time to reach a place of safety.

The uncertainty of this method led to many accidents and various measures were introduced to improve safety for those involved. One was replacing the iron wire, by which the passage for the gunpowder is formed, with one of copper, to eliminate sparking that could ignite the powder prematurely. Another was the use of a safety fuse. This consisted of small train of gunpowder inserted in a water-proof cord, which burns at a steady and uniform rate. This in turn was later replaced by a long piece of wire that was used to deliver an electric charge to ignite the explosive. The first to use this method for underwater blasting was Charles Pasley who employed it in 1839 to break up the wreck of the British warship HMS Royal George which had become a shipping hazard at Spithead.

An early major use of blasting to remove rock occurred in 1843 when the British civil engineer William Cubitt used 18,000 lbs of gunpowder to remove a 400-foot-high chalk cliff near Dover as part of the construction of the South Eastern Railway. About 400,000 cubic yards of chalk was displaced in an exercise that it was estimated saved the company six months time and £7,000 in expense.

While drilling and blasting saw limited use in pre-industrial times using gunpowder (such as with the Blue Ridge Tunnel in the United States, built in the 1850s), it was not until more powerful (and safer) explosives, such as dynamite (patented 1867), as well as powered drills were developed, that its potential was fully realised.

Drilling and blasting was successfully used to construct tunnels throughout the world, notably the Fréjus Rail Tunnel, the Gotthard Rail Tunnel, the Simplon Tunnel, the Jungfraubahn and even the longest road tunnel in the world, Lærdalstunnelen, are constructed using this method.

In 1990, 2.1 billion kg of commercial explosives were consumed in the United States (12 m^{3} per capita), representing an estimated expenditure of 3.5 to 4 billion 1993 dollars on blasting. In this year the Soviet Union was the leader in total volume with 2.7 billion kg of explosives consumed (13 m^{3} per capita), and Australia had the highest per capita explosives consumption that year with 45 m^{3} per capita.

== Procedure ==
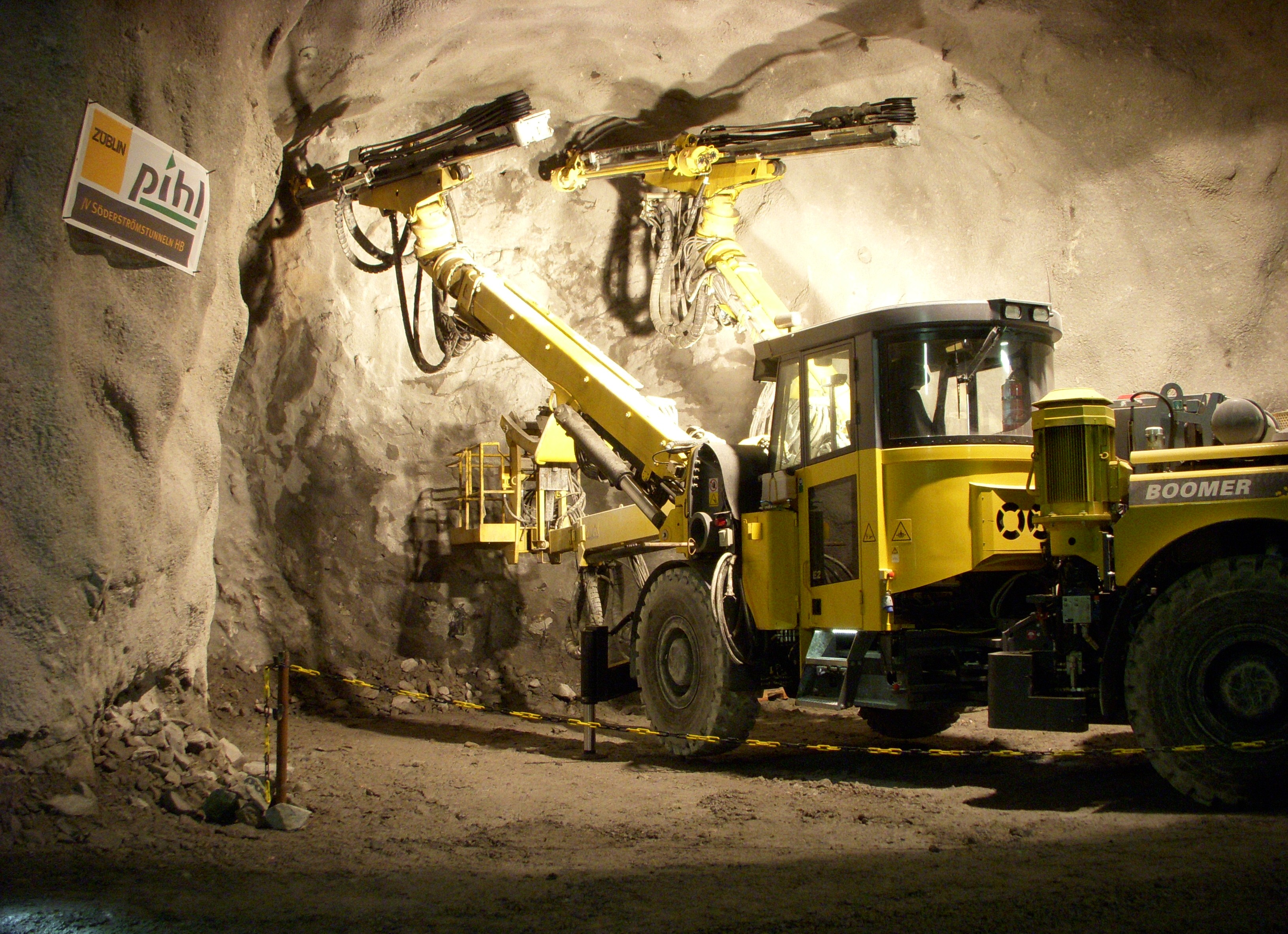
A drill jumbo during the construction of Citybanan under Stockholm, used for drilling holes for explosives

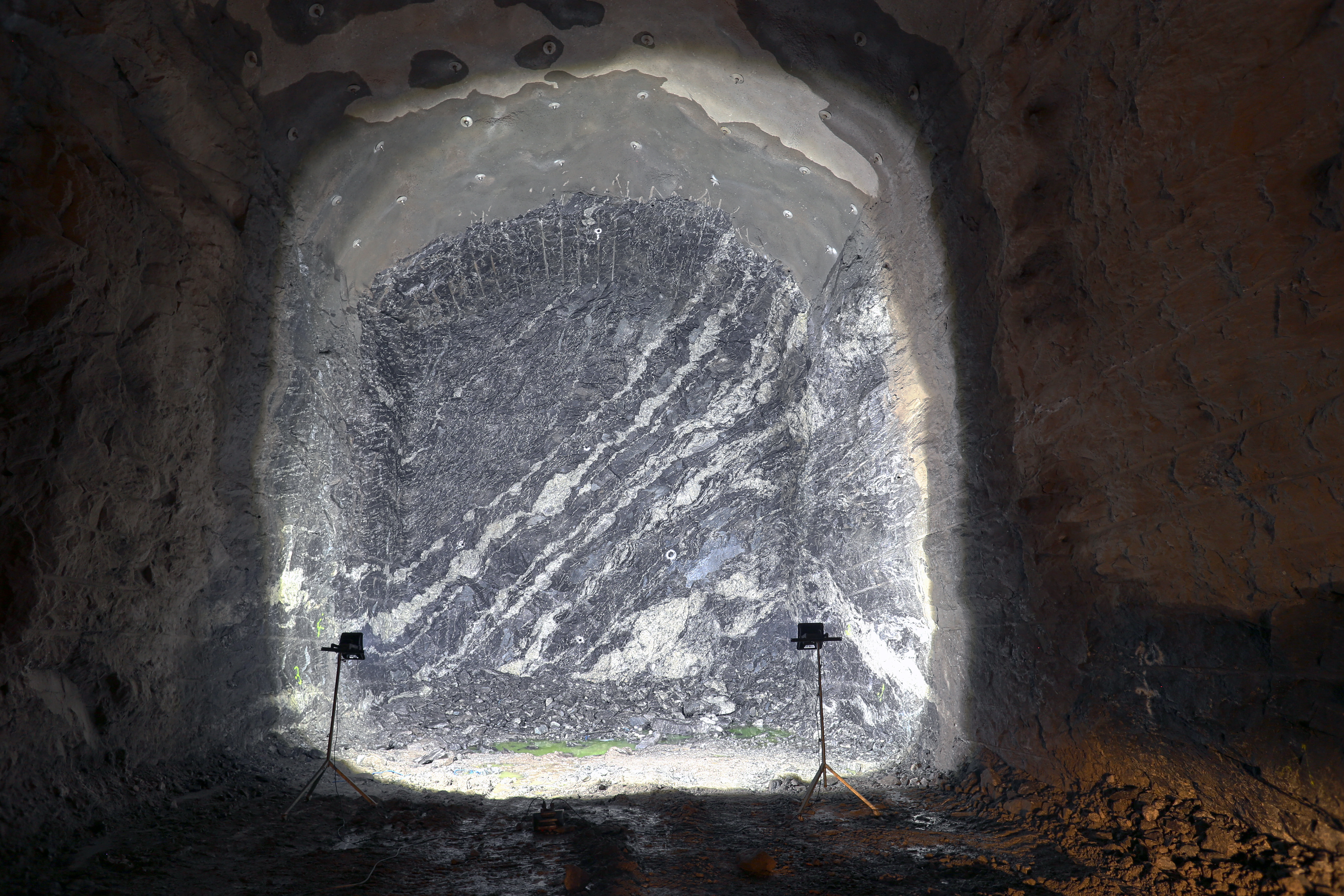
Excavated tunnel round before securing with bolting and shotcrete.

As the name suggests, drilling and blasting works as follows:

- A blast pattern is created
- A number of holes are drilled into the rock, which are then partially filled with explosives.
- Stemming, inert material, is packed into the holes to direct the explosive force into the surrounding rock.
- Detonating the explosive causes the rock to collapse.
- Rubble is removed and the new tunnel surface is reinforced.
- Repeating these steps until desired excavation is complete.

The positions and depths of the holes (and the amount of explosive each hole receives) are determined by a carefully constructed pattern, which, together with the correct timing of the individual explosions, will guarantee that the tunnel will have an approximately circular cross-section.

During operation, blasting mats may be used to contain the blast, suppress dust and noise, for fly rock prevention and sometimes to direct the blast.

== Rock support ==
As a tunnel or excavation progresses the roof and side walls need to be supported to stop the rock falling into the excavation. The philosophy and methods for rock support vary widely but typical rock support systems can include:

- Rock bolts or rock dowels
- Shotcrete
- Ribs or mining arches and lagging
- Cable bolts
- In-situ concrete

Typically a rock support system would include a number of these support methods, each intended to undertake a specific role in the rock support such as the combination of rock bolting and shotcrete.

== Gallery ==
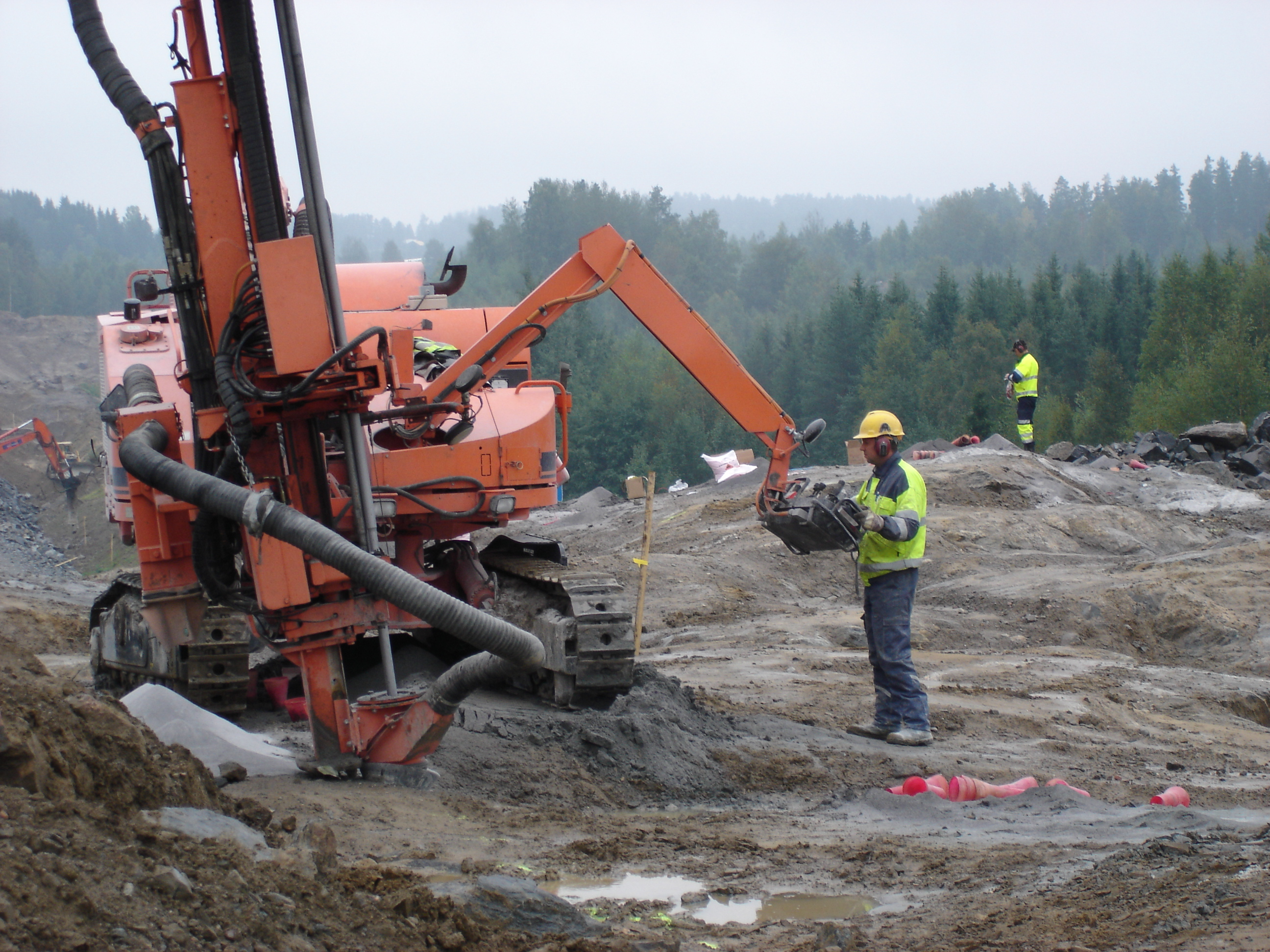
Blast hole drilling with Tamrock Scout 700

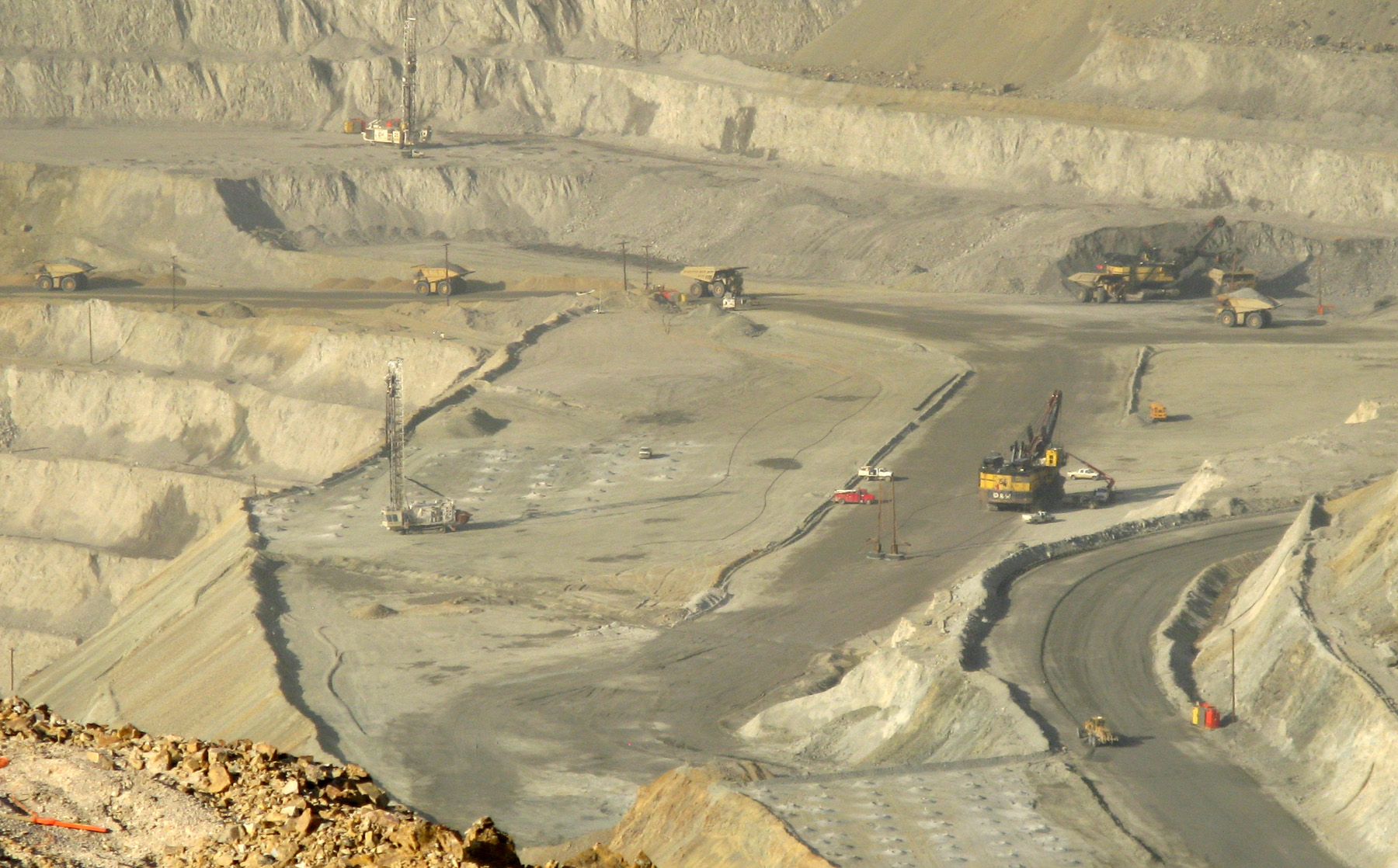
Blast-hole drilling at the Bingham Canyon Mine, Utah. Note the pattern of drill holes being prepared for blasting.

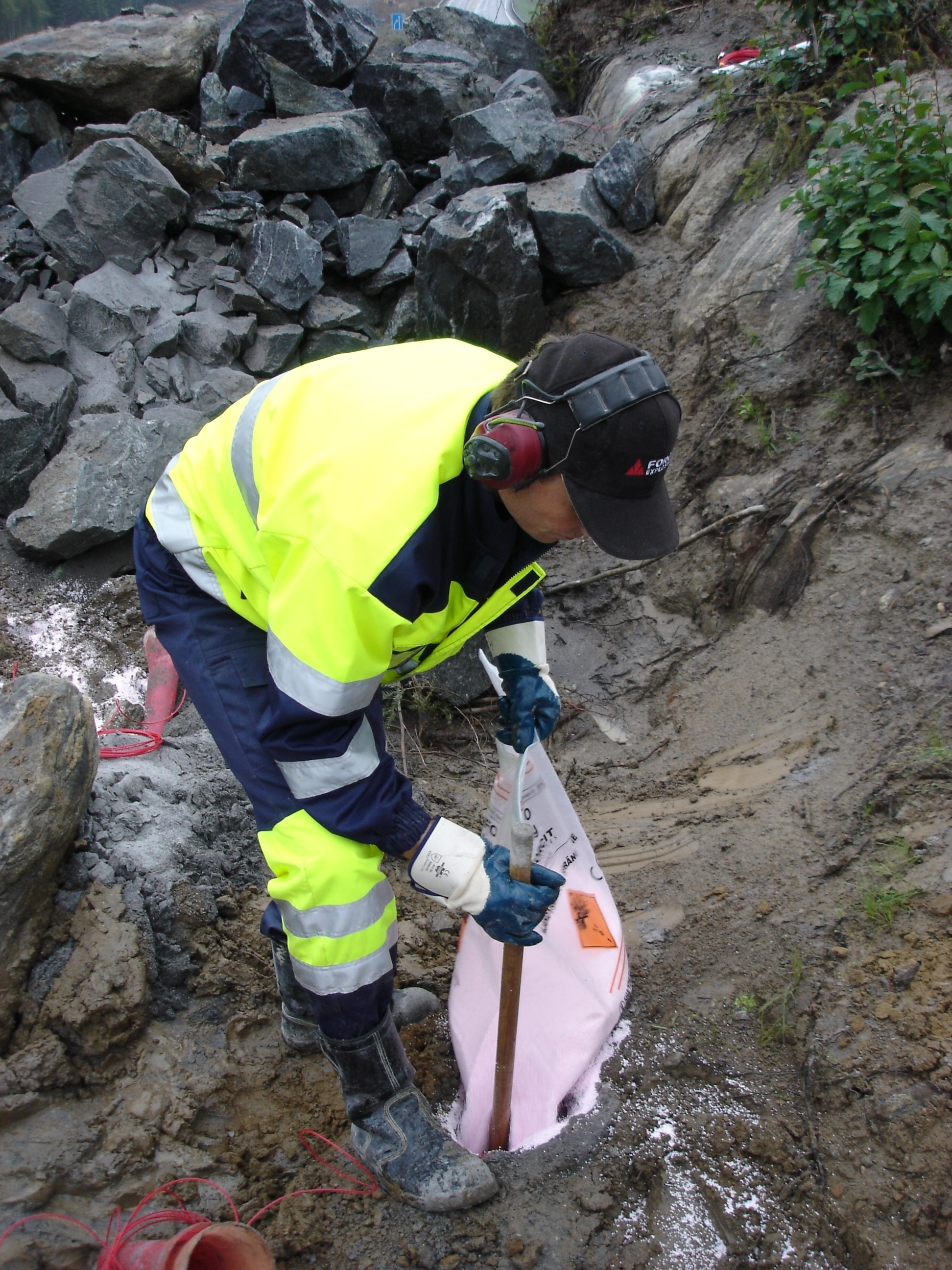
Loading blast holes with ANFO

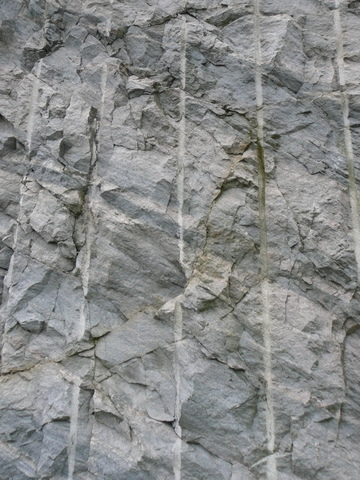
Rock surface newly blasted. This is called pre-split, it's a technique to leave a smooth face.

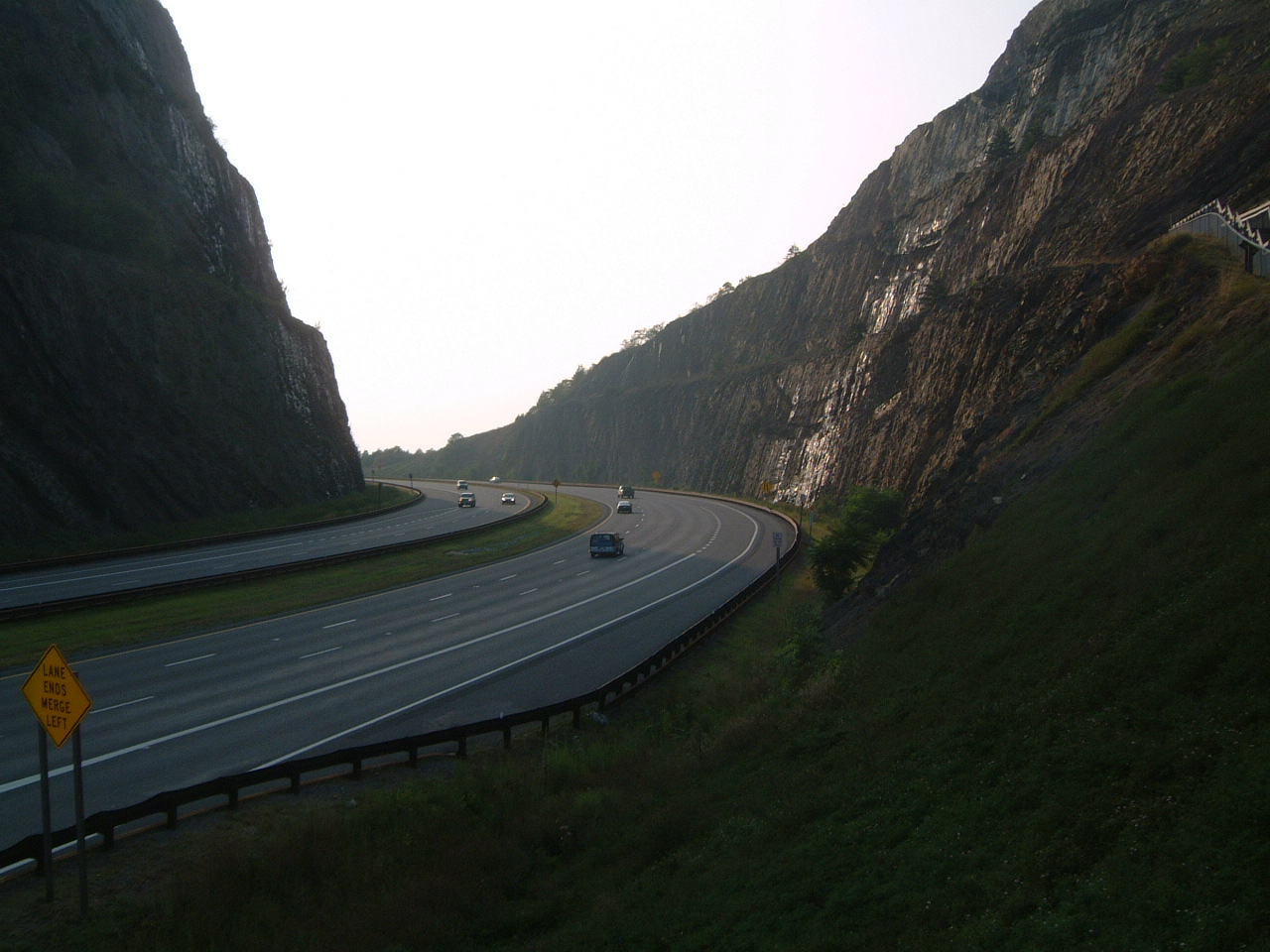
Sideling Hill road cut formed by rock blasting

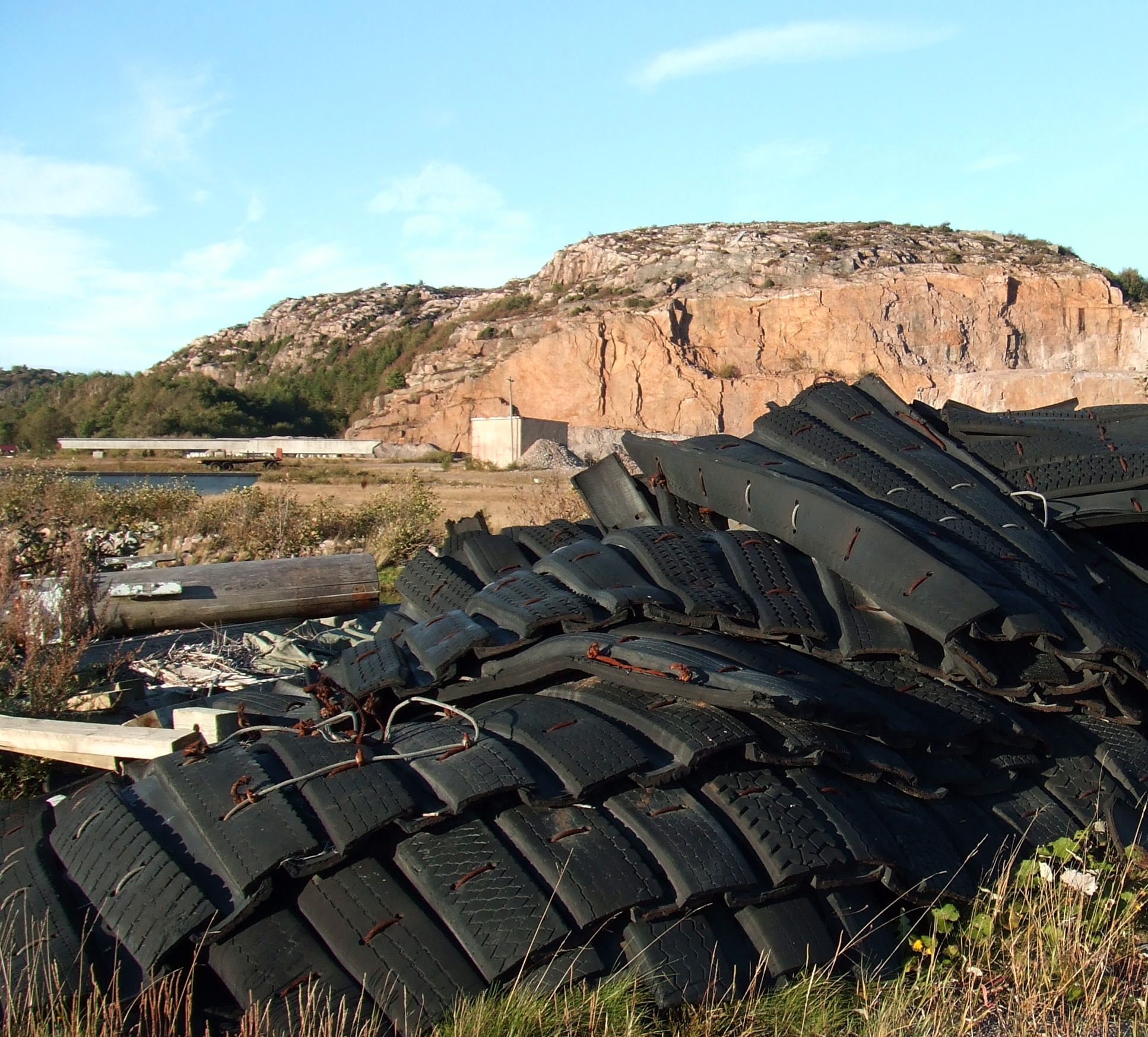
Tire blasting mats for fly rock prevention and dust suppression.

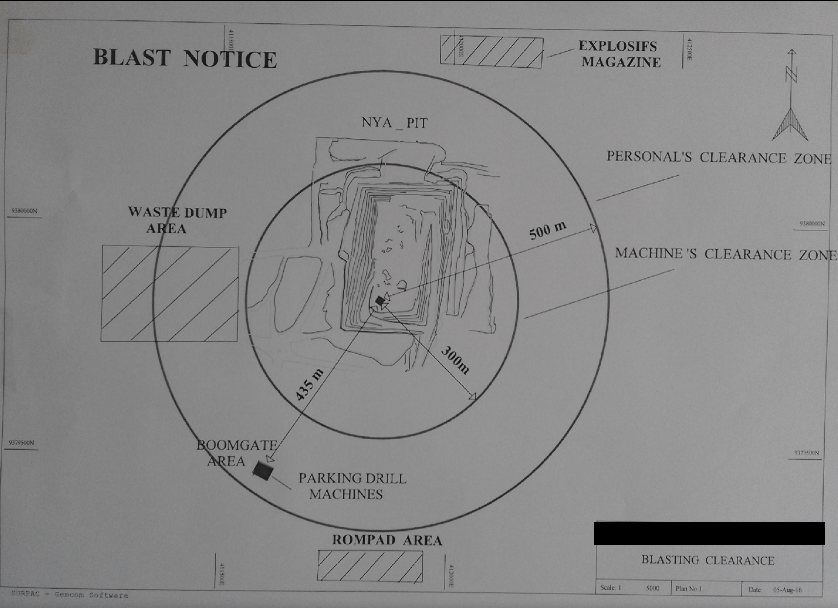
Map describing the clearance zones during blasting in a limestone quarry. These notices are produced by surveyors (see topography).

Blast hole drilling in a dolerite quarry at Prospect Hill, Sydney, Australia

== See also ==
- Building implosion
- Demolition
- International Society for Explosive Engineers
