= Bogdan Voitsekhovsky =

Soviet and Ukrainian scientist

Bogdan Vyacheslavovich Voitsekhovsky (Russian: Богдан Вячеславович Войцеховский; 1922–1999) was a Soviet and Ukrainian scientist, specialist in the field of hydraulic impulse technique, explosion physics, atmospheric electricity, employee of the Institute of Hydrodynamics.

== History ==
Voitsekhovsky was born on 22 January 1922 in the village (selo) of Soroka, in modern Vinnytsia Oblast of Ukraine.

By the time he graduated from secondary school in 1940 in Kiev, he was already working as a laboratory assistant at the industrial technical school.

In 1940, Voitsekhovsky was drafted into the Red Army. At the outbreak of war, he received short training at the School of Communication and participated in the battles on the Karelian and 4th Ukrainian fronts.

After demobilization, in 1947 he entered the Physical and Technical Faculty of Moscow State University. During his studies, the Faculty was transformed into the Moscow Mechanical Institute of Munitions/Moscow Engineering Physics Institute, from which he graduated in 1953.

In 1951, the young specialist began working in scientific teams under the direction of Mikhail Lavrentyev.

In 1954, he defended his Candidate's Dissertation.

From 1956 to 1958, Voitsekhovsky headed the research laboratory of Moscow Institute of Physics and Technology, where he conducted research in the field of explosion physics.

In 1958, the scientist joined the Siberian Branch of the USSR Academy of Sciences. In this year, he became the head of the Department of the Institute of Hydrodynamics.

In 1959, he began teaching at Novosibirsk State University, where he headed the department of physics of fast dynamic processes (1962–1973).

In 1961, in Novosibirsk, physicist defended his dictoral dissertation.

A deputy of Novosibirsk Regional Council of People's Deputies (1962–1964).

From 1965 to 1973, the scientist was the deputy director of the Institute of Hydrodynamics.

In 1996, Voitsekhovsky moved in the United States, where his son lived at that time.

He died on 21 August 1999 in Grafton, West Virginia.

== Activities ==
Voitsekhovsky produced over 200 scientific papers and made more than 100 inventions.

He developed a dynamic protection for tank armor against cumulative projectiles.

Vitsekhovsky organized and headed the Special Design Bureau of Hydraulic Impulse Technique. At the same time, he continued to work at the Institute of Hydrodynamics.

The scientist devoted about 20 years to the developments of new principles in the field of hydraulic impulse technique, which led to the foundation of new scientific design school, it became the basis for the creation of various equipment: hydraulic breakers, water cannons with record jet parametrs, centrifuges for purification of liquid metals, aerodynamic benches, vibrational seismic sources, drilling equipment, rock breaking hydraulic strikers etc.

Voitsekhovsky has developed a series of hydrauluc machines for metal processing, percussion drilling and rock breaking.

Among his developments was the installation for the vibrational "translucence" of the Earth, which was designed to search for undergrounds minerals. In the Soviet period, a testing ground operated for this development, it was located in Akademgorodok on the shores of Novosibirsk Reservoir.

He also created cutting equipment for nuclear reprocessing, designed to cut zirconium tubes. According to professor Valery Kedrinsky, the task was to create equipment that could withstand about 10 000–20 000 cuts, but the Voitsekhovsky "scissors" could withstand 250 000 cuts.

Physicist deciphered the structure of spin detonation in gases and discovered transverse detonation waves.

The scientist contributed to the study of atmospheric electricity. He recreated St. Elmo's fire in his laboratory at the Institute of Hydrodynamics. Subsequently, the installation for reproducing this natural phenomenon was demonstrated at the Pyotr Kapitsa's laboratory in Moscow.

He was engaged in the creation of hurricane-resistant wind installations and developed summation methods for their powers and energy accumulation. He proposed a scheme of the crew, that could operate in light winds (about 2 meters per second). According to the recollections of employees of the Institute of Hydrodynamics, Voirsekhovsky's wind installations were located in front of one of the institute buildings for some time. After moving to the United States, he continued to be interested in wind equipment and science in general.

== Awards ==
The scientist was awarded two Orders of the Red Banner of Labour (1956, 1972), Order of Lenin (1967), Order of the Badge of Honour (1982), Order of the Patriotic War II degree (1985), six medals.

In 1965, he became a recipient of the Lenin Prize.

In 1993, the Russian Academy of Sciences awarded Voitsekhovsky the Mikhail Lavrentyev Gold Medal.
