= International Society of Explosives Engineers =

International Society of Explosives Engineers (ISEE)
- Formation: 1974
- Type: Engineering Society
- Headquarters: Cleveland, Ohio
- Members: 4000+
- Official language: English
- Executive Director: Steven B. Shivak
- Staff: 10
- Website: www.isee.org

The International Society of Explosives Engineers (ISEE) is a tax-exempt professional body founded in 1974 to "advance the science and art of explosives engineering." Headquartered in Cleveland, Ohio, it is the primary international organization for explosives engineers. Current president of ISEE is Janeen T. Smith.

== History ==
ISEE was founded in Pittsburgh in 1974, when a small group of explosives engineers came together to discuss how to advance the science and art of explosives engineering. Since then the ISEE has grown to over 4000 members with 45 local chapters.

== Publications ==
The ISEE has 2 primary peer-reviewed publications, and an industry handbook.

=== Journals ===
- Journal of Explosives Engineering
- Blasting and Fragmentation Journal

=== Books ===
- Blasters' Handbook, 18th Edition

== Conferences and education ==
Each year more than 1500 blasters, manufacturers, government officials and industry leaders, come together for an annual conference. The Blasters Weekend is a preconference event targeted at field personnel focusing on more practical knowledge and skills. The main conference is 3 days of technical papers and presentations. Both conference events qualify for continuing education units (CEUs) and/or professional development hours (PDHs) for most states licensing programs. ISEE also founded ISEE children's funds which is now contributing in educational expenses of dependents of a person who was killed in an explosive accident or suffered a related incident.

== Awards and designations ==
Industry awards and designations presented at the annual national conference.

- Blaster's Leadership Award
- Driller's Leadership Award
- Distinguished Service Award
- Paper of the Year
- President's Award
