= Lists of military equipment =

The List of military equipment includes sub-lists by type and country.

== By type ==
- List of military vehicles
- List of weapons

== By time period ==
=== Historical ===
==== World War I ====
- List of German weapons of World War I

==== World War II ====
- List of Australian military equipment of World War II
- List of military equipment of the Canadian Army during the Second World War
- List of Chinese military equipment in World War II
- List of Croatian military equipment of World War II
- List of Dutch military equipment of World War II
- List of German military equipment of World War II
- List of British military equipment of World War II
- Italian Army equipment in World War II
- List of Japanese military equipment of World War II
- Military equipment of Sweden during World War II
- List of Thailand military equipment of World War II
- List of USA army military equipment of World War II
- List of Soviet Union military equipment of World War II

=== Modern ===
- List of military equipment of NATO - contains sub-lists by country.
- List of equipment of the Armed Forces of Ukraine
- Equipment of the Syrian Army
- List of equipment of the Algerian People's National Army
- List of infantry weapons and equipment of the Canadian military
- List of military electronics of the United States
- List of military equipment of Croatia
- List of military equipment used by Syrian opposition forces
- List of military equipment manufactured in Iran
- List of equipment of the Russian Ground Forces
- List of modern Russian small arms and light weapons

== By era or conflict ==
- List of infantry weapons of World War I
- List of equipment used in World War II
- List of Korean War weapons
- List of weapons of the Vietnam War
- List of weapons of the Laotian Civil War
- List of weapons of the Cambodian Civil War
- List of Russo-Ukrainian war military equipment

== By country ==
=== France ===
- List of World War II weapons of France
- List of Cold War weapons and land equipment of France
- List of equipment of the French Army
- List of French Navy ship names
- List of military aircraft of France

=== Germany ===
- List of military weapons of Germany
- List of military land vehicles of Germany
- List of military aircraft of Germany
- List of naval ships of Germany
- List of German World War I aircraft
- List of World War II military aircraft of Germany
- List of modern equipment of the German Army
- List of active equipment of the German Air Force
- List of active German Navy ships
- List of active aircraft of the German Navy
- List of active weapons of the German Navy
- List of Sd.Kfz. designations

== See also ==
- Military technology and equipment
- List of military bases
- List of cancelled military projects
