= List of military equipment of NATO =

This is a list of links to articles and lists containing the equipment lists for NATO members.

== Albania ==
- List of equipment of the Albanian Armed Forces
- List of Albanian Air Force aircraft

== Belgium ==
- List of equipment of the Belgian Land Component
- Belgian Air Component
- Belgian Navy

== Bulgaria ==
- List of modern equipment of the Bulgarian Armed Forces
- Bulgarian Air Force
- Bulgarian Navy

== Canada ==
- List of equipment of the Canadian Armed Forces
- Royal Canadian Air Force
- List of current ships of the Royal Canadian Navy

== Croatia ==
- List of equipment of the Croatian Army
- Croatian Air Force
- List of active Croatian Navy ships

== Czech Republic ==
- List of military equipment of the Czech Army
- List of military aircraft of the Czech Republic

== Denmark ==
- List of equipment of the Royal Danish Army
- Royal Danish Air Force
- List of active Royal Danish Navy ships

== Estonia ==
- List of equipment of the Estonian Defence Forces
- Estonian Air Force
- List of active Estonian Navy ships

== Finland ==
- List of equipment of the Finnish Army
- Finnish Air Force
- List of active Finnish Navy ships

== France ==
- List of equipment of the French Army
- French Air and Space Force
- List of active French Navy ships

== Germany ==
- List of modern equipment of the German Army
- German Air Force
- List of active German Navy ships

== Greece ==
- List of equipment of the Hellenic Army
- Hellenic Air Force
- List of active Hellenic Navy ships

== Hungary ==
- List of equipment of the Hungarian Ground Forces
- Hungarian Air Force

== Iceland ==
- Defence of Iceland

== Italy ==
- List of equipment of the Italian Army
- Italian Air Force
- Italian Navy

== Latvia ==
- List of equipment of the Latvian Land Forces
- Latvian National Guard
- Latvian Air Force
- Latvian Naval Forces

== Lithuania ==
- List of equipment of the Lithuanian Armed Forces
- Lithuanian Air Force
- Lithuanian Navy

== Luxembourg ==
- Luxembourg Armed Forces

== Montenegro ==
- List of equipment of the Montenegrin Ground Army
- Montenegrin Navy
- Montenegrin Air Force

== Netherlands ==
- List of equipment of the Royal Netherlands Army
- Royal Netherlands Air and Space Force
- List of active Royal Netherlands Navy ships

== North Macedonia ==
- List of equipment of the Army of North Macedonia
- North Macedonia Air Brigade

== Norway ==
- List of equipment of the Norwegian Army
- Royal Norwegian Air Force
- List of Royal Norwegian Navy ships

== Poland ==
- List of equipment of the Polish Land Forces
- Polish Air Force
- List of ships of the Polish Navy

== Portugal ==
- List of equipment of the Portuguese Army
- Portuguese Air Force
- List of active Portuguese Navy ships

== Romania ==
- List of equipment of the Romanian Armed Forces
- List of aircraft of the Romanian Air Force

== Slovakia ==
- List of equipment of the Slovak Ground Forces
- Slovak Air Force

== Slovenia ==
- Slovenian Armed Forces

== Spain ==
- Spanish Army
- Spanish Air and Space Force
- Spanish Navy

== Sweden ==
- List of equipment of the Swedish Armed Forces

== Turkey ==
- List of equipment of the Turkish Land Forces
- Turkish Air Force
- List of active ships of the Turkish Naval Forces

== United Kingdom ==
- List of equipment of the British Army
- List of active United Kingdom military aircraft
- List of active Royal Navy ships

== United States ==
- List of equipment of the United States Army
- United States Air Force
- List of current ships of the United States Navy
