= List of equipment of the Army of North Macedonia =

This is a list of equipment used by the Army of North Macedonia.

== Individual equipment ==
Name	Type	Origin	Picture	Notes
M92	Camouflage pattern	North Macedonia		Entered service in or around 1992, this pattern was the first home grown one made for the Macedonian army. It has seen use in the 2001 insurgency in limited or full use by soldiers. Used for trainings today.
M96	Camouflage pattern	North Macedonia		This pattern is the second home grown camo pattern for the Macedonian army. Designed and entered service around 1996. It is one of the most used camo patterns by the Macedonian army and it still gets issued today in limited numbers as a reserve uniform to soldiers and such.
M98	Camouflage pattern	North Macedonia		Third home grown pattern, designed 1998 and entered service the same year. It was used somewhere up until 2009.
M09 Digital Pattern (Woodland)	Camouflage pattern	North Macedonia		Introduced in 2010, the M09 Digital Pattern is the Army's Standard-issue Camouflage. Uniforms produced by YUMCO and Teteks Tetovo.
M09 Digital Pattern (Desert)	Camouflage pattern	North Macedonia		Desert pattern of M09. Produced by Teteks Tetovo. Standard-issue as well.
U.S. Woodland	Camouflage pattern	United States		Used by some units in the past, primarily used for trainings today.
DCU pattern	Camouflage pattern	United States		Used by Macedonian troops participating in ISAF and OIF.
M91 Eurokompozit	Combat helmet	North Macedonia		Standard-issue helmet of the North Macedonian Army, Homegrown version of the PASGT helmet. Produced by 11 Oktomvri Eurokompozit a.d. Prilep.
M89 Eurokompozit	Combat helmet	North Macedonia		Used in training, parades and by new conscripts. Homegrown version of the Yugoslav M59/89 JUŠ. Produced by 11 Oktomvri Eurokompozit a.d. Prilep.
Future Assault Shell Technology helmet	Combat Helmet	United States		Used by the Special Operations Regiment, Macedonian soldiers participating in KFOR and seen on parades outfitted with Macedonian camouflage.
Ballistic Vest BE-02 Military	Bulletproof vest	North Macedonia		Some variations used in training, some variations used by regular troops and police. Produced by 11 Oktomvri Eurokompozit ad Prilep.
Mile Dragić vest	Bulletproof vest	Serbia		Possibly another Standard-issue vest of the Macedonian army, unknown usage other than its usage by Macedonian troops in Afghanistan.
Type III and Type IIIA ballistic vests	Bulletproof vest	Turkey		Standard-issue vest of the North Macedonian army. Variant with AK mag pouches and Macedonian camouflage.
Templars Gear CPC (Gen 2)	Bulletproof vest	North Macedonia		Used by the Special Operations Regiment. Issued in Coyote and with its according battle belt, the PT-3, also produced by Templars Gear.
ATS-AHC-03 Pangolin ACH High Cut	Combat Helmet	North Macedonia; France		Current issue, ATS Ballistics claims to produce it. Though it seems to be bought from a French company, Pangolin, which produces the exact same helmet.

== Small arms ==
Name	Type	Origin	Notes
Pistols
Glock 17	Pistol	Austria	9×19mm Used by the Special Operations Regiment
HS2000	Pistol	Croatia	9×19mm
CZ 75	Pistol	Czechoslovakia	9×19mm
Zastava CZ99	Pistol	Yugoslavia	9×19mm Standard issued pistol of the army.
Daewoo DP-51	Pistol	South Korea	9×19mm
Submachine guns
H&K MP5	Submachine gun	Germany	9×19mm
Assault rifles
Zastava M70	Assault rifle	Yugoslavia	7.62×39mm Standard issued rifle of the army.
AKM	Assault rifle	Soviet Union	7.62×39mm
Zastava M90	Assault rifle	Yugoslavia	5.56×45mm
Zastava M92	Assault rifle	Yugoslavia	7.62×39mm
Zastava M21	Assault rifle	Serbia and Montenegro	5.56×45mm
H&K G3A7	Assault rifle	Germany	7.62×51mm
M4 carbine	Assault rifle	United States	5.56×45mm Used by Special Operations Regiment
Semi-automatic rifles
Zastava M59/66	Semi-automatic rifle	Yugoslavia	7.62×39mm Used by the Ceremonial Guard Battalion.
Sniper rifles
SVD	Sniper rifle	Soviet Union	7.62×54mmR
Zastava M76	Sniper rifle	Yugoslavia	7.92×57mm
Zastava M93	Sniper rifle	Serbia	12.7×108mm
ZVI Falcon	Sniper rifle	Czech Republic	12.7×108mm
Sako TRG	Sniper rifle	Finland	7.62×51mm
Machine guns
DShK	Machine gun	Soviet Union	12.7×108mm
PKM	Machine gun	Soviet Union	7.62×54mmR
Zastava M84	Machine gun	Yugoslavia	7.62×54mmR
MG 3	Machine gun	Germany	7.62×51mm
M240	Machine gun	United States	7.62×51mm
M249 SAW	Machine gun	United States	5.56×45mm
NSV	Heavy machine gun	Soviet Union	12.7×108mm
M2 Browning	Heavy machine gun	United States	12.7×99mm
Shotguns
Benelli Nova	Shotgun	Italy	12 gauge
Protecta	Shotgun	South Africa	12 gauge
Grenade launchers
Zastava BGA 30	Grenade launcher	Serbia	30mm
GP-25	Grenade launcher	Soviet Union	40mm
RBG-6	Grenade launcher	Croatia	40mm
M203	Grenade launcher	United States	40mm
Anti-tank
M80 Zolja	Man-portable missile	Yugoslavia	64mm
M79 Osa	Man-portable missile	Yugoslavia	90mm
MILAN	Anti-tank guided missile	France	115mm
M90 Stršljen	Man-portable missile	Serbia; North Macedonia	120mm

== Military vehicles ==
Model	Image	Origin	In service	Notes
Infantry fighting vehicles (11)
BMP-2		Soviet Union	11	
Armoured personnel carriers - tracked (50)
Leonidas		Greece	10	
M113		United States	30	
MT-LB		Soviet Union	10	
Armoured personnel carriers - wheeled (169)
Stryker		United States	17/(+25 on order)	The sale of 54 Stryker vehicles was approved by the U.S. in 2021 for a total cost of $210 million ($30 million of which was donated). The package includes M2A1 0.50 caliber machine guns, M6 smoke grenade launchers and associated spares, Harris radios, Common Remotely Operated Weapon Station (CROWS), Defense Advanced GPS Receiver, AN/VAS-5 driver's vision enhancer, and other parts and components. In 2024, the order was reduced to 42 Strykers. As of March 2026, 17 Stryker infantry carrier vehicle were delivered. The remaining 25 Strykers are expected to arrive during summer 2026.
TM-170		West Germany	84	
BTR-80		Soviet Union	12	
BTR-70		Soviet Union	56	
Infantry mobility vehicles (69)
JLTV		United States	67/(total 96 on order)	Will get all 96 by the end of 2025. Variants: 66 M1278A1/A2 JLTV Heavy Gun Carriers, 24 M1280A1/A2 JLTV General Purpose vehicles, 6 M1281A1/A2 JLTV Close Combat Weapons Carriers.; Some armed with M153 CROWS. A contract for 33 JLTV, to be delivered in 2022 and 2023, was signed in 2020. 99 JLTV were planned and options existed to buy a total of up to 152 JLTV by 2024. In July 2022, the first 6 JLTVs were delivered to the Army, and the rest (of the 33) were delivered by year end of 2022.
Cobra		Turkey	2	

=== Logistics vehicles ===
Vehicle	Photo	Origin	Type	In service	Notes
Light military vehicles
Humvee		United States	Light armored vehicle	100+	Variants: Armoured; Semi Armored; Communications; Тransport
Husky VMMD		South Africa	Mine-resistant ambush-protected	2	
Utility vehicles
Pinzgauer 710		Austria	Light utility vehicle	30+	
Mercedes G		West Germany	Light utility vehicle	80+	36 MB290GD SOF donated by Norway
Land Rover Defender		United Kingdom	Light utility vehicle	150+	
Military trucks
Iveco		Italy	Medium utility truck	44	
DAF		Netherlands	Medium utility truck	126	
BMC		Turkey	Medium utility truck	10+	
Scania P3		Sweden	Medium utility truck	40	Donated by Norway
Oshkosh FMTV		United States	Medium utility truck	10+	
M35/44		United States	Medium utility truck	150+	In reserve.

=== Artillery ===
Artillery	Photo	Origin	Type	In service	Notes
Field artillery
MKE Boran		Turkey	105mm howitzer	6/(total 18 on order)	18 on order- with the potential of 36 more
M-56		Yugoslavia	105mm howitzer	14	
M2A1		United States	105mm howitzer	36	
M-30		Soviet Union	122mm howitzer	100+	
Multiple launch rocket system
M-63 Plamen		Yugoslavia	128mm MLRS	12	
BM-21 Grad		Soviet Union	122mm MLRS	6	
Mortars
M57 60 mm		Yugoslavia	Light mortars	100+	
M69 82 mm		Yugoslavia	Medium mortar	100+	
M52UB 120 mm		Yugoslavia	Heavy mortars	100+	

== Air Force ==
Aircraft	Image	Origin	Type	Variant	In service	Notes
Helicopters
Mil Mi-17		Soviet Union	Transport/Utility		2	
Mil Mi-8		Soviet Union	Transport/Utility	Mi-8MTV	4	
Bell 206		United States	Trainer/Utility		4	
AW149		Italy	Transport/Utility		0/(4 on order)	4 ordered from Leonardo S.p.A.
AW169		Italy	Transport/Utility		0/(4 on order)	4 ordered from Leonardo S.p.A.
Trainer aircraft
Zlin 143		Czechoslovakia	Basic trainer		1	
Zlin 242		Czechoslovakia	Basic trainer		5	
Unmanned aerial vehicles
Elbit Hermes 450		Israel	UAS		Unknown	seen being used by the Macedonian Air Brigade

== Air defense ==
System	Photo	Origin	Type	In service	Notes
Surface-to-air missiles
Mistral B-3		France	Surface-to-air missile	(18 on order)	About 18 will be delivered to Macedonia confirmed by the minister of defense.
9K32 Strela-2		Soviet Union	Surface-to-air missile	30+	
9K35 Strela-10		Soviet Union	Surface-to-air missile	8	
9K38 Igla		Soviet Union	Surface-to-air missile	10+	
Anti aircraft guns
Zastava M55 20 mm		Yugoslavia	Autocannon	30+	
Bofors 40 mm		Sweden	Autocannon	30+	

== Retired equipment ==
- Sukhoi Su-25 x4 – retired, in 2023 all 4 Su-25 were donated to Ukraine
- Mil Mi-24 - in 2023 all 12 Mi-24 were donated to Ukraine
- T-72 x31 – donated to Ukraine
- T-34/85 x4 – retired, turned into museum pieces
- BRDM-2 x10 – retired
- T-55A x93 – retired
- BTR-60P x31 – retired
- UH-1H x2 – retired

== Sources ==
- International Institute for Strategic Studies (12 February 2025). The Military Balance 2025. London: Routledge. ISBN 9781003630760.
