= List of equipment of the Armed Forces of Croatia =

The List of military equipment of Croatia is an alphabetical listing of all types used by or produced in Croatia since independence in 1991.

== A ==
- Agram 2000/2002: 9 mm weapon made in Croatia.
- APS-95: 5.56 mm rifle made in Croatia.
- AT-4 Spigot, Antitank missile from the Soviet Union.
- AT-7 Saxhorn, Antitank missile from the Soviet Union.

== B ==
- BOV, light armored vehicle from Yugoslavia.
- BRDM-2, reconnaissance vehicle from the Soviet Union.
- BTR-50, armored personnel carrier from the Soviet Union.
- BTR-60, armored personnel carrier from the Soviet Union.

== C ==
- Commando 60 mm mortar, Croatian mortar.

== D ==
- Dragon Skin Body Armor -Ballistic vest

== E ==
- EM-992, Croatian sniper rifle version of the .300 Winchester Magnum.
- Ero, Croatian variant of the Uzi.

== F ==
- FN-FAL, Assault rifle from Belgium.

== G ==
- G-2 Galeb, light combat aircraft from Yugoslavia (withdrawn).
- G36, Assault rifle from Germany.
- Gorenje, .22 cal pistol of Yugoslav origin.

== H ==
- HS2000, Croatian-made 9 mm pistol

== I ==
- Ingram MAC-10, .45 cal submachine gun of United States origin.
- Iveco LMV

== J ==
- J-21 Jastreb, light combat aircraft from Yugoslavia (withdrawn).

== K ==
- Konkurs, Antitank missile from the Soviet Union.

== L ==
- LOV-1

== M ==
- M2HB Browning, .50 cal machine gun of United States origin.
- M49, 7.62 mm of Yugoslav origin (withdrawn).
- M52 P2/P3 hand grenade Yugoslav hand grenade, defensive
- M56 Submachine gun, 7.62 mm of Yugoslav origin.
- M56 howitzer, copy of the M101A1.
- M59 rifle, copy of Soviet SKS.
- M59/66, improved version of basic M59 (reserve).
- M60 rifle grenade
- M60 recoilless gun, 82 mm recoilless gun from Yugoslavia.
- OT M-60, armored personnel carrier built in Yugoslavia.
- M61 Skorpion, 7.65 mm automatic pistol of Czechoslovak origin.
- M68 mortar, 81 mm mortar from Yugoslavia.
- M69A, 82 mm mortar from Yugoslavia.
- M74 mortar, 120 mm mortar from Yugoslavia.
- M75 hand grenade, Yugoslav hand grenade, offensive
- M75 mortar, 120 mm mortar built in Yugoslavia and Croatia.
- Zastava M76, sniper rifle of Yugoslav origin.
- M79 anti-tank grenade, Yugoslav anti-tank grenade, copy of the Russian RKG-3
- M79, 82 mm recoilless rifle from Yugoslavia.
- M79 Osa, 90 mm antitank weapon from Yugoslavia.
- BVP M-80, armored personnel carrier built in Yugoslavia (modernized).
- M80 Zolja, 64 mm antitank weapon from Yugoslavia.
- M-83 (vehicle), antitank vehicle from Yugoslavia.
- M84 machine gun, copy of Soviet PK machine gun.
- M-84, main battle tank built in Yugoslavia and Croatia (modernized).
- M85, copy of Soviet AKSU-74 assault rifle.
- M86 machine gun, copy of Soviet PKT machine gun.
- M87 machine gun, copy of Soviet NSVT machine gun.
- M87 Topaz, 100 mm antitank gun from Yugoslavia.
- M90, 120 mm antitank weapon from Yugoslavia.
- M90 mortar, 60 mm mortar from Yugoslavia.
- M93 hand grenade, Macedonian hand grenade
- M-93 mortar, 82 mm mortar built in Croatia.
- M-95 Degman, new main battle tank.
- M-96 mortar, 82 mm mortar built in Croatia.
- M-98 Jelen, Croatian weapon, sniper.
- M1919A4 Browning, 7.62 mm machine gun of United States origin.
- M1948, 76 mm field gun from the Soviet Union.
- 9M14 Malyutka, antitank missile of Soviet origin.
- MiG-21, light fighter of Soviet design.
- MILAN, Antitank missile from France.
- Mini Ero, Small version of the Ero.
- MP5, 9 mm submachine gun of German origin.
- MT-12 Rapira, 100 mm antitank gun from the Soviet Union.
- MT-LB, armored carrier from the Soviet Union.

== P ==
- Patria AMV, 8x8 Armored personnel carrier. 280 may be planned.

== R ==
- R4, 5.56 mm assault rifle from South Africa.
- RBG-6, 40 mm grenade launcher.
- RL90 M95, copy of the M79 rocket launcher.
- RPG-7, rocket propelled grenade of Soviet origin.
- RT-20, 20 mm tactical sniper rifle, anti-materiel rifle.

== S ==
- SOKO J-22 Orao, Sub-sonic ground attack jet.

== T ==
- T-12 antitank gun, 100 mm antitank gun of Soviet origin (in reserve).
- T-34-85, medium tank of Soviet origin (withdrawn).
- T-55, medium tank of Soviet origin (built in Poland, reserve).
- T-72, main battle tank of Soviet origin (modernized).
- Thompson, .45 cal submachine gun of United States origin (withdrawn).

== U ==
- UBM-52, 120 mm mortar from Yugoslavia.
- Uzi, 9 mm submachine gun of Israeli origin.
- Ultimax 100, 5.56 mm MG with 100-round drum magazine, from Singapore.

== V ==
- VHS Assault Rifle Croatian service rifle

== Z ==
- ZIS-3, 76.2 mm field gun from the Soviet Union.

== See also ==
- List of equipment of the Croatian Army
- List of active Croatian Navy ships
- List of equipment of the Croatian Air Force
- Lists of military equipment
