= List of equipment of the Montenegrin Ground Army =

This is a list of equipment and weapons used by the Montenegrin Ground Army.

Base supplies
Name	Type	Picture	Notes
PASGT	Combat helmet		Standard issue combat helmet, Croatian-made are included.
MICH	Combat helmet		Current standard issue.
MOLLE	Load-bearing vest		Standard issue.
Modular Tactical Vest	Bulletproof vest		
M89 camouflage pattern	Military camouflage Combat uniform		Phased out.
M03 Camouflage pattern	Military camouflage Combat uniform		Former standard issue camo and combat uniform, replaced with Multicam.
MultiCam	Military camouflage Combat uniform		Standard issue from 2009.

Name	Country manufactured	Cartridge	Quantity	Pictures	Notes
Pistols
Tara TM9	Montenegro	9×19mm Parabellum			Standard pistol of Montenegrin Military (produced in Montenegro)
Zastava CZ99	Yugoslavia	9×19mm Parabellum			
Glock 17	Austria	9×19mm Parabellum			Standard pistol of Montenegrin Special Forces
Rifles & Assault rifles
Tara TM4	Montenegro	5.56×45mm NATO			Used by special forces, it will be in service at all branches
Zastava M59/66	Yugoslavia	7.62×39mm			Ceremonial rifle
Zastava M70/M70A	Yugoslavia	7.62×39mm			Limited use
Steyr AUG	Austria	5.56×45mm NATO			Used by Special Forces
Heckler & Koch G36	Germany	5.56×45mm NATO			Standard rifle of Montenegrin Military
Heckler & Koch HK416	Germany	5.56×45mm NATO			Used by Special Forces
Submachine guns
Heckler & Koch MP5	West Germany	9×19mm Parabellum			Used by Special Forces
Designated marksman rifle & Sniper rifles
Zastava M76	Yugoslavia	7.92×57mm Mauser			In reserve
Zastava M91	Yugoslavia	7.62×54mmR			In reserve
Zastava M93 Black Arrow	Yugoslavia	12.7×108mm			In service
Heckler & Koch PSG1	West Germany	7.62×51mm NATO			In service
Machine guns
Zastava M72	Yugoslavia	7.62×39mm			In service
Zastava M84	Yugoslavia	7.62×54mmR			In service
NSV machine gun	Soviet Union Russia	12.7 × 108 mm			In service
M2 Browning	United States	.50 BMG			In service
Grenade launchers
BGA 30mm	Yugoslavia	30×29mm			In service
Heckler & Koch AG36	Germany	40×46mm			In service
Anti-tank
M79 Osa	Yugoslavia	90 mm rocket			In service, planned to buy new MANPADS
M80 Zolja	Yugoslavia	64 mm rocket			
9M14 Malyutka	Soviet Union	64 mm rocket			In service
Mortars
M57	Yugoslavia	60 mm			In service
M69	Yugoslavia	82 mm	44		In service
M74/M75	Yugoslavia	120 mm	32		In service
Howitzers
D-30J 122 mm	Soviet Union	122 mm	12		In service
MLRS
M-94 Plamen-S	Yugoslavia	128 mm	12+(6)		In service
Armoured personnel carriers
Joint Light Tactical Vehicle	United States		57		57 In service.
BOV VP М86	Yugoslavia		6		In service
Achleitner RCV Survivor	Austria		4		In service, planned to buy another 26 vehicles.
LAPV Enok	Germany		6		Upcoming donation from Bundeswehr
Otokar Cobra	Turkey		1		Nuclear, biological, chemical reconnaissance vehicle.
Tank destroyers
BOV 1 POLO M-83	Yugoslavia		6+(3)		In service, armed with 6 AT-3 missiles
Off-road utility vehicles
Lada Niva 1.5; Lada Niva 1.7	Soviet Union				In service
Pinzgauer 710	Austria				In service
Achleitner MMV Survivor	Austria; Japan		16		In service, planned to buy another 20 vehicles.
Toyota Hilux	Japan				In service
Puch 300GD; Puch 290D	Austria				In service
Mercedes-Benz G-Class	West Germany / Germany				In service
Trucks
FAP 2026; FAP 2226; FAP 1314	Yugoslavia				In service
TAM 110; TAM 130; TAM 150	Yugoslavia			Military Montenegro	In service
Logistics vehicles
IMK TG-110; IMK TG-140; IMK TG-160; IMK TG-190; IMK TG-220	Yugoslavia				Tracked bulldozer
IMK ULT-160	Yugoslavia				Wheeled bulldozer
Mercedes-Benz Unimog	Germany				Multi-purpose utility vehicle
CAT 434F	United States				Backhoe loader
