= RBR =

RBR may refer to:

- Red Bull Racing, a Formula One motor racing team
- Red Bank Regional High School, a regional high school (often called RBR) in Little Silver, New Jersey
- Richard Burns Rally, a video game
- Rietumu Banka - Riga, cycling team
- Righteous Babe Records, the recording label of singer-songwriter Ani DiFranco
- Rio Branco International Airport, in Brazil
- RBR-120 mm M90, a portable anti-tank rocket launcher
- Royal Berkshire Regiment, an infantry regiment in the British Army from 1881 to 1959
- Royal Bermuda Regiment, a local defence infantry regiment of the British Army
