= List of equipment of the Latvian Land Forces =

This is a list of weapons and equipment used by the Latvian Land Forces. For naval equipment and ships, see Latvian Naval Forces; for the list of aircraft, see Latvian Air Force. The Latvian National Guard equipment and vehicles are listed in the respective article.

Latvia uses military equipment compatible with the NATO standards.

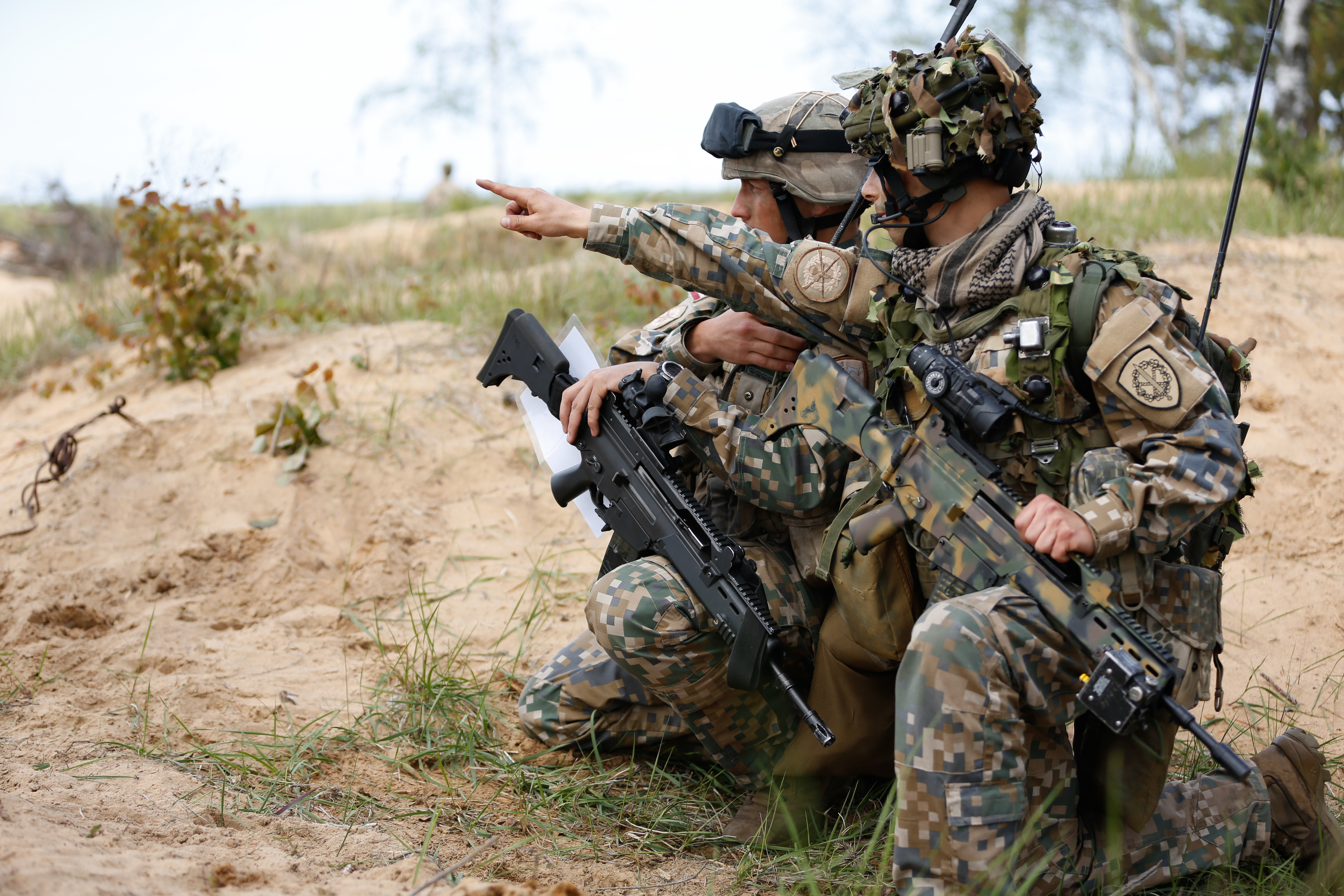
MultiLATPAT camouflage pattern and NFM BEAR-II vest

== Personal equipment ==
The equipment of the Latvian Land Forces troops includes:

- LatPat, Multi-LatPat and WoodLatPat (Latvian digital camouflage uniform).
- Norwegian BEAR-II load bearing armor system
- Kevlar helmets
- Night vision devices
- Gas masks (14 000 ordered from UK in 2019). Avon FM50 gas masks acquired in 2022.

== Infantry weapons ==
| Model | Image | Origin | Variant | Type | Caliber | Details |
Pistols
| Glock | | Austria | Glock 17 Glock 19 Glock 21 Glock 26 | Semi-automatic pistol | 9×19mm Parabellum | Standard issue pistol. |
| Heckler & Koch P2 | | Germany | HK P2A1 | Flare gun | 26.5mm | Complementary order in 2024 |
Submachine guns
| Heckler & Koch UMP | | Germany | UMP9 | Submachine gun | 9×19mm Parabellum | Standard issue submachine gun. |
| Heckler & Koch MP5 | | West Germany | MP5A3 | Submachine gun | 9×19mm Parabellum | Special Forces |
| Heckler & Koch MP7 | | Germany | MP7A2 | Personal defense weapon | HK 4.6×30mm | |
Shotguns
| Remington 870 | | United States | MCS | Pump action shotgun | 12 gauge | |
| Winchester 1300 | | United States | | Pump action shotgun | 12 gauge | Is going to be replaced. |
| Mossberg 500 | | United States | | Pump action shotgun | 12 gauge | It is planned to be replaced. |
Assault rifles
| Heckler & Koch G36 | | Germany | G36V; G36KV; G36KV3 | Assault rifle | 5.56×45mm NATO | Standard issue assault rifle. Complementary order in 2024. |
| M16 | | United States | M16A1 | Assault rifle | 5.56×45mm NATO | Used by Honour Guard, as ceremonial rifle. |
Precision rifles
| Heckler & Koch HK417 | | Germany | HK417A2 | Designated marksman rifle | 7.62×51mm NATO | |
| Accuracy International Arctic Warfare | | United Kingdom | AW | Bolt action sniper rifle | 7.62×51mm NATO | AW variant used to be the standard issue sniper rifle. |
| Accuracy International AXMC | | United Kingdom | AXMC | Bolt action sniper rifle | 8.6×70mm | |
| Accuracy International AX50 | | United Kingdom | AX50 ELR | Anti materiel sniper rifle | 12.7×99mm NATO | |
| PGM Hécate II | | France | | Anti materiel sniper rifle | 12.7×99mm NATO | Standard issue heavy sniper rifle. |
| Barrett M107 | | United States | M107A1 | Anti materiel sniper rifle | 12.7×99mm NATO | |
Machine guns
| FN Minimi | | Belgium | Minimi Para | Light machine gun | 5.56×45mm NATO | Standard issue light machine gun. |
| FN MAG Kulspruta 58 | | Belgium Sweden | FN MAG Kulspruta 58 B | General-purpose machine gun | 7.62×51mm NATO | |
| M2 Browning | | United States Belgium | M2HB-QCB | Heavy machine gun | 12.7×99mm NATO | |
Protocol service weapons
| M14 | | United States | | Battle rifle | 7.62×51mm NATO | Used by Honour Guard, as ceremonial rifle. |
| Lee-Enfield | | United Kingdom | No.4 MkI* | Bolt action rifle | .303 British | 120 rifles were donated by Canada. Used by Honour Guard, as ceremonial rifle. |
Grenade launchers
| Heckler & Koch AG36 | | Germany | | Under-barrel grenade launcher | 40×46mm LV | |
| Milkor MGL | | South Africa; Croatia | Metallic RBG-6 | Automatic grenade launcher | 40×46mm LV | Produced initially without license by Metallic d.o.o. |
| Heckler & Koch GMG | | Germany | | Automatic grenade launcher | 40×53mm HV | Complementary order in 2024 |
Man-portable anti-tank systems
| AT4 | | Sweden | | Recoilless gun | 84 mm | Light weight, one-shot, disposable. |
| Carl Gustav recoilless rifle | | Sweden | M2 M4 | Recoilless rifle | 84 mm | Re-loadable, fires a variety of ammunition. M2 variant used by the National Guard. 800 Carl Gustaf M2 were donated by Norway. Improved M4 variant on order. |
| SPIKE | | Israel | SR LR I LR II ER II | Anti-tank guided missile | | Modern tripod-mounted launcher, programmable attack, fire-and-forget. Fires several missile types, varying in weight and size as they fly from shorter to longer ranges. |
Mines
| DM 22 | | Germany | | Directional anti-tank mine | | |
| C-5 anti-tank mines | | Spain | | Anti-tank mine | | |

== Military vehicles ==
| Name | Image | Origin | Type | Variants | Quantity | Notes |
Armoured fighting vehicles
| ASCOD 2 | | Spain | Infantry fighting vehicle | ASCOD 2 Hunter | 1 (+83 on order) | In 2024, Latvian Ministry of Defense made a decision to acquire ASCOD 2 to replace the CVR(T). In January 2025, Latvia signed €373 million contract for 42 vehicles. In June 2025, another 42 vehicles were ordered. The first vehicle was delivered in October 2026. |
| CVR(T) | | United Kingdom | Armoured reconnaissance vehicle | Scimitar; Sultan; Spartan; Samson; Samaritan | Less than about 184 (205 in 2020) | In 2020, 198 modernized vehicles in service, plus 7 used for training. Some are equipped with Spike anti-tank missiles. Some donated to Ukraine. 9 donated to Ukraine in 2024. 12 donated to Ukraine in 2025 (maybe the 9 from 2024 are included in these 12 in 2025). More vehicles donated to Ukraine in 2026. |
Armoured vehicles
| Patria 6×6 | | Finland; Latvia | Armoured personnel carrier | Patria 6×6 | ~100 (total ~256 on order) | Over 200 vehicles on order, to be delivered 2021–2029. The first 4 vehicles received on 29 October 2021. The vehicles are partially produced in Latvia since 2021. In November 2024, 56 additional command vehicles were ordered. |
| Humvee | | United States | Armoured car | M1043A2 M1113 | 30 12 | Ten vehicles donated by the United States in 2005. Possibly 28 more purchased later. Some equipped with HK GMG, M2 Browning and Spike anti-tank guided missile. |
| Mercedes-Benz G-Class | | Austria Germany | Armored car (special forces) | 290GD | 50 | Second hand from Norway |
Amphibious vehicles
| Bv 206 | | Sweden | Tracked articulated vehicle (amphibious) | Bv 206A; Bv 206F | 100+ | Donated by Sweden in 2002 and 2003. |
Light vehicles
| VR-1-FOX | | Latvia | Fast attack vehicle | | 1 (30+ on order) | Latvian Armed Forces tested 1 VR FOX prototype and in November 2024 Latvian Ministry of Defense made a decision to acquire more than 30 VR FOX vehicles |
| Polaris RZR | | United States | Fast attack vehicle | MRZR-2; MRZR-4; MV850 | 62 | Option for up to 130 vehicles. |
| Can-Am Outlander | | Finland; Canada | All-terrain vehicle | Outlander MAX 650XT | 582 | |
Logistics (large order for new logistics vehicles in 2023)
| Mercedes-Benz Unimog | | Germany | Truck | U1300 U5000 | 120 | Unimog 416's donated by Denmark in May 2004. |
| Scania | | Sweden | Truck | P93 NM154 | 184 8 | 134 P93 trucks and 8 NM154 recovery vehicles donated by Norway in 2013. 50 more trucks purchased in 2014. |
Engineering equipment
| M3 Amphibious Rig | | Germany | Amphibious bridge layer | | 4 | 4 delivered, 2 to be delivered 2026. |
| Skorpion-2 | | Germany | Minelayer truck | | | Ordered from Dynamit Nobel Defence in October 2025, to be used to lay AT2+ anti-tank mines (€ 50 million). First delivery in December 2025. |
Utility vehicles
| Mercedes-Benz G-Class | | Austria; Germany | SUV | 240GD 300GDN | +66 12 | 300+ 240GD bought initially from Norway in 2004. |
| Land Rover Defender | | United Kingdom | SUV | D110 | 2 | D110 variant used by military police. Received before 2004. |
| Subaru Forester | | Japan | SUV | | 23 | 23 vehicles used by military police |
| Nissan Navara | | Japan | SUV | | ~55 | |
| Peugeot 308 | | France | Car | | ~50 | |
| Ford Transit Custom | | Germany Belgium | Light commercial vehicle | | ~35 | |

== Indirect fire ==
| Model | Image | Origin | Type | Caliber | Quantity | Details |
Mortars
| GrW 86 | | Austria | Heavy mortar | 120 mm | | Multiple units purchased from Austria in 2017. |
| m/41D | | Finland; Sweden | Heavy mortar | 120 mm | 20~ | |
| M120 mortar | | Israel | Heavy mortar | 120 mm | 25 | |
Self-propelled artillery
| MORANA | | Czechia | Self-propelled howitzer | 155 mm L/52 | 0 (18 on order) | In September 2026, Latvian government decided to acquire MORANA produced by Excalibur Army (instead of the initial decision to acquire Swedish Archer). |
| M109A5Ö | Latvian Army M109 A5o Howitzer | United States; Austria | Self-propelled howitzer | 155 mm L/39 | 47 | 35 howitzers, 10 command and control vehicles and 2 driver training vehicles purchased from Austria in 2017. Additional 18 howitzers received in 2021. 6 howizers were donated to Ukraine. |
| M109; Rechenstellenpanzer M109 | Latvian Army M109 A5o Howitzer | United States; Austria | Command and artillery computing station | – | 10 | |
| M109 driver training | Latvian Army M109 A5o Howitzer | United States; Austria | Driver training vehicle | – | 2 | |
Rocket artillery
| M142 HIMARS | | United States | MLRS | 227 mm | 0 (6 on order) | In October 2022, Latvian Ministry of Defense announced the acquisition of 6 systems. The contract was signed in December 2023. Included were 12 M30A2 GMLRS AW Pods; 12 M31A2 GMLRS-U HE Pods; 10 M57 ATACMS Pods; and RRPR (practise rocket) Pods. |

== Unmanned aerial vehicles ==
| Model | Image | Origin | Variant | Type | Role | |
|---|---|---|---|---|---|---|
| UAV Factory Penguin C | | Latvia | Penguin C | Fixed-wing unmanned aerial vehicle | Intelligence, surveillance, target acquisition, and reconnaissance | Long-endurance unmanned aerial vehicles. |
| AeroVironment RQ-20 Puma | | United States | RQ-20A | Fixed-wing unmanned aerial vehicle | Intelligence, surveillance, target acquisition, and reconnaissance | 3 systems, each having 3 unmanned aerial vehicles. |

== Anti-ship weapons ==
| Model | Image | Origin | Type | Caliber | Notes |
|---|---|---|---|---|---|
| Naval Strike Missile | | Norway | Anti-ship/land-attack missile | | Contract signed in 2023 and the system is planned to be operational in 2027. The missiles will be used as a coastal defence system. |

== Air defence ==
| Model | Image | Origin | Variant | Type | Details |
Short-range air-defence
| PPZR Piorun | | Poland | | Man-portable air-defense system | Undisclosed number of missiles ordered in 2022.Complementary order in 2026. |
| RBS-70 | | Sweden | RBS-70 Mk 1, Mk 2, NG | Man-portable air-defense system | |
| Frankenburg Mark 1 | | Estonia | Mark 1 | Small range air defence missile system | Test batch from Frankenburg Technologies |
Medium-range air defence
| IRIS-T | | Germany | IRIS-T SLM | Medium range air defence missile system | In May 2023, Estonia and Latvia made a decision to jointly procure medium-range IRIS-T SLM. The contract was signed in November 2023 and the systems are planned to be operational in 2026. |
Radars and surveillance systems
| AN/MPQ-64F1 Sentinel | | United States | AN/MPQ-64F1 | 3D air search radar | 4 AN/MPQ-64F1 Sentinel radars (mobile radars). |
| AN/TPS-77 | | United States | AN/TPS-77 TPS-77 MRR | 3D air search radar | 3 AN/TPS-77 (stationary radar stations), 3 TPS-77 MRR (mobile radar). Used for the Baltic Air Surveillance Network. |
| Hensoldt TRML 4D | | Germany | | Air surveillance and target acquisition radar | Radar for the IRIS-T SML air defence system |
| Saab Giraffe | | Sweden | Giraffe 1X | Short range | |
| | | | | Acoustic drone detection system | |

== Retired/obsolete equipment ==
Extended content

=== 1918–1940 ===
During the Latvian War of Independence, the armed formations of the Republic of Latvia (which were united into the Latvian Army in July 1919) used a wide range of surplus weapons acquired from Russian, German and other stocks. Substantial support was offered by British, French and other forces. The main infantry rifle after the war was the Pattern 1914 Enfield (P14).

=== 1991–present ===
In the 1990s, the Latvian Army and National Guard troops were equipped with leftover Soviet, Romanian and Czechoslovak weapons like the AKM, AK-74, SKS rifles and TT and Makarov pistols, alongside early procurements of CZ 82 pistols from the Czech Republic and Slovakia. In the late 1990s, a gradual switch to the Swedish-made Automatkarbin 4 began, but AK-pattern rifles remained. Today Ak4 rifles are mostly kept in storage. In 1995, the Czechs donated 20 120mm mortars (possibly the 120-PM-43 mortar) and 24 100 mm vz. 53 field guns. According to Military Balance 2025, the 100 mm vz. 53 guns are still in storage in Latvia. Around 2002, the armed forces also reportedly had M60 machine guns in stock.

Retired/obsolete vehicles include:

- 2 BRDM-2 armored cars (donated by Poland by 1992, mostly used by the Suži Airborne Reconnaissance Battalion of the Land Forces, later used as target practice);
- 5 T-55AM2 Mérida tanks (donated by Poland in 1999). Three remaining tanks, still used for training purposes as of 2024, were reported to have come from the Czech Republic in 2000, not Poland;
- ~12 Terrängbil m/42 KP APCs (donated around 1994 by Sweden to the Baltic states, retired by the late 1990s or early 2000s; at least one transferred to the State Border Guard);
- 17+ Volkswagen Iltis utility vehicles (received from Germany), CUCV Chevrolet M1008 and M1009 (from Denmark) and Dodge variants (from the United States) – received before 2004, most retired at least since 2019;
- Volvo Viking L385 and L4855 trucks (donated by Sweden in the 1990s, retired at least since 2019);
- Magirus-Deutz Jupiter 178D15 and Iveco-Magirus 90M6FL trucks (donated by Denmark in late 1994–late 90s);
- GAZ-53 and GAZ SAZ-3507 trucks;
- Willys M38A1 (donated by Denmark to the Baltic states in late 1994) and UAZ-469 jeeps;
- Volvo TGB 211A and TGB 131.
