= Sloboda (defense company) =

Serbian defense company

Coordinates: 43°52′46″N 20°18′51″E

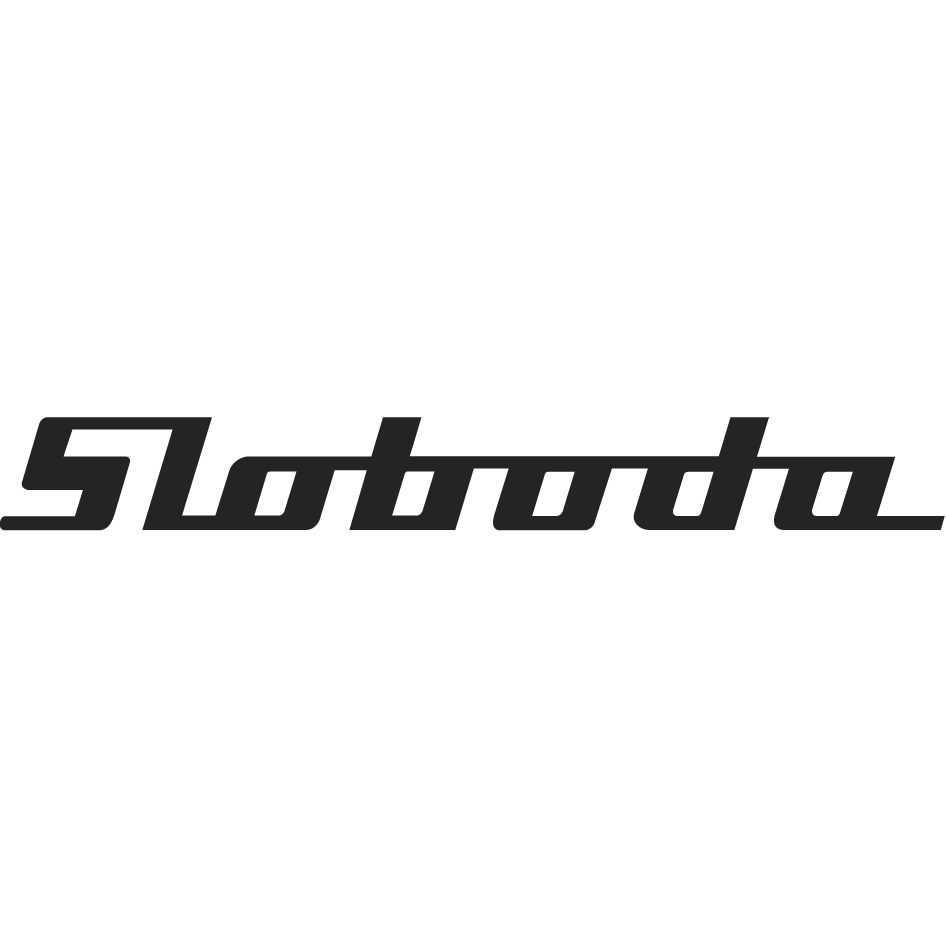

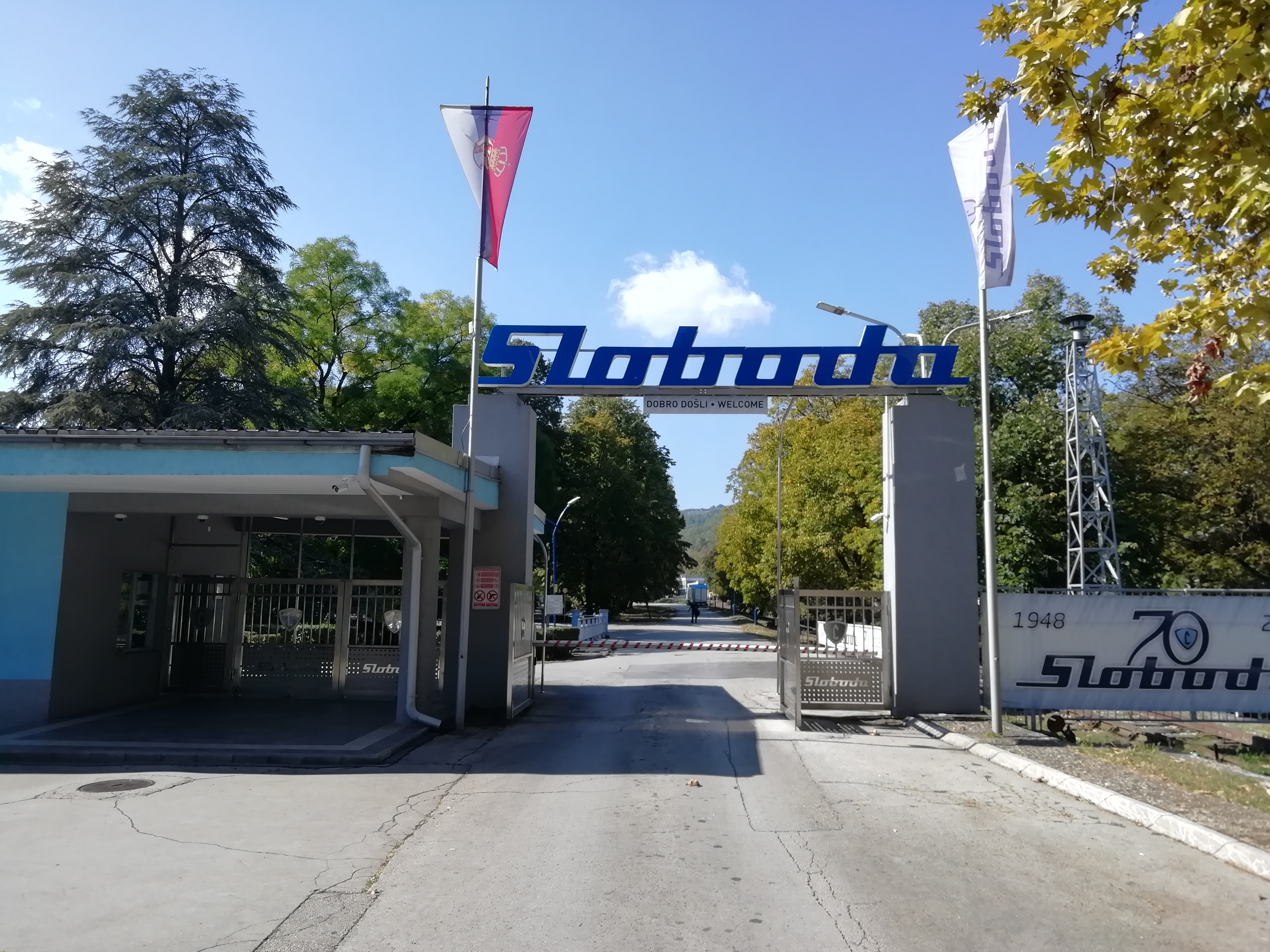
- Native name: Слобода; Sloboda
- Type: Joint-stock company
- Industry: Defense
- Founded: 12 October 1948; 78 years ago
- Headquarters: Ratka Mitrovića bb, Čačak, Serbia
- Area served: Worldwide
- Key people: Zoran Stefanović (General director)
- Products: Ammunitions
- Revenue: ▼€62.21 million (2018)
- Net income: ▼€3.51 million (2018)
- Total assets: ▲€117.57 million (2018)
- Total equity: ▲€49.81 million (2018)
- Owner: Government of Serbia (52.1%); Social assets (37.2%); Development Fund (10.6%)
- Number of employees: 2,121 (2018)
- Website: sloboda.co.rs
- Footnotes; Business ID: 07206178; Tax ID: 100892378

Sloboda (Serbian: Слобода) is a Serbian defense company that manufactures ammunition. With around 2,000 employees, it is one of the largest employers in Moravica District.

== History ==
Sloboda was established in 1948 by the Yugoslav government. In Socialist Yugoslavia, it was one of the largest companies in the country, with around 7,000 employees. It manufactured a variety of products, for military use and for home appliances. The production was greatly reduced during the 1990s breakup of Yugoslavia, when Western countries imposed sanctions on Serbia and Montenegro. During the 1999 NATO bombing of Yugoslavia, the company's facilities were several times bombed.

From 2010 to 2017, 30 million euros has been invested in company's facilities. By 2016, destroyed facilities were largely reconstructed and put into operation. In November 2017, former prominent company's subsidiary "Sloboda aparati" (home appliances), finally transferred its facilities to Sloboda Čačak (military ammunition). During 2017, the Government of Serbia invested two million euros in company's modernization, for the needs of defense industry. As of 2017, the company has contracts worth 150 million euros. In 2018, the Serbian Minister of Defence announced further investments over the next three years.

== Products ==
Sloboda manufactures different types of ammunition and RPGs:

- 76, 100, 105, 122, 152, 155mm artillery ammunition
- 100mm, 125mm tank ammunition
- 20, 23, 30, 37, 40 and 57mm caliber ammunition
- M79 Osa
- M80 Zolja
- M90 Stršljen

== Incidents ==
On 12 January 2010, one employee was hurt after explosion in pyrotechnics department of the factory.

On 27 December 2010, there were series of explosions in pyrotechnics department, however nobody was injured. On 1 July 2013, two employees were injured in an explosion in a production line.

On 4 June 2021, there were series of explosions in an ammunition depot, which caused a huge fire. Several workers and nearby residents were evacuated, but no injuries have been reported.

On 19 June 2021, there was one big explosion at gunpowder depot; three employees were hurt.

== See also ==
- Defense industry of Serbia
