= List of Cold War weapons and land equipment of France =

This is a list of weapons of the French Army during the Cold War. During the early period of the Cold War France was fighting colonial wars such as the First Indochina War and the Algerian War the same as other colonial powers of the time like Britain and the Netherlands. Despite France withdrawing from NATO in 1966 it did still cooperate with NATO and made plans to reinforce NATO with French Army units against a Soviet invasion as can be seen from the formation of the Rapid Action Force which was intended to reinforce NATO troops in the event of a conflict.

== Small arms ==
=== Rifles ===
- MAS-36 rifle- Used in World War II by France equipped second line units.
- MAS-49 rifle- Semiauto rifle and main French service rifle of Cold War.
- FAMAS-Automatic bullpup Replaced MAS 49 and MAT 49 in 1978.

=== Sniper rifles ===
- MAS-49/56- Introduced in 1936, both the MAS-49 and MAS-49/56 would serve France until 1967 being replaced by the FR F1 sniper. It replaced the MAS-36 in the sniper role.
- FR F1 sniper rifle- Introduced in 1966, the rifle was in use with the French Armed Forces until 1989. Replaced the MAS-49/56.
- FR F2 sniper rifle- Replaced FR F1 near the end of the Cold War in 1986.

=== Sidearms ===
- Pistolet automatique modèle 1935A-Standard French sidearm of World War II.
- Pistolet automatique modèle 1935S- French WWII era sidearm.
- MAC Mle 1950- Main French sidearm of the Cold War.

=== Machine guns ===
- FM 24/29 light machine gun- Standard French light machine gun of World War II.
- AA-52 machine gun- Standard French machine gun during Cold War.

=== Submachine guns ===
- MAT-49- Standard French submachine gun of the Cold War, replacing the MAS-38 in the 1950s.

=== Anti-tank weapons ===
- Super Bazooka
- 73mm LRAC-Entered service in 1950s until being replaced by the LRAC F1.
- LRAC F1-Replaced Super Bazooka in the 1970s.
- MILAN

=== Mortars ===
- Brandt Mle 27/31
- Brandt Mle 1935
- M2 mortar

== Artillery ==
=== Self propelled ===
- M41 Howitzer Motor Carriage
- Mk F3 155mm - developed in early 1950s, entering service in 1962 to replace the M41 Gorilla. Based on AMX-13 light tank chassis.
- AMX-30 AuF1 - entered service in 1977 and remains as the standard SPG of the French Army, replacing the Mk F3 155mm. Based on the AMX-30 MBT chassis.

== Armoured fighting vehicles(AFV's) ==
=== Tanks ===
- ARL 44 - entered service in 1949, replacing German Panther tanks in French service. Design proved unsatisfactory and was phased out in 1953.
- M47 Patton - A US tank entering French service in 1954, replacing the ARL 44 due to the cancellation of the AMX 50 design.
- AMX-30 - Entered service in 1966, replacing M47 Patton in French service. It would serve until 2011.

=== Light tanks ===
- M24 Chaffee
- AMX-13

==== Armoured cars ====
- Panhard EBR
- Panhard AML
- AMX-10 RC

=== Infantry fighting vehicles(IFV's) ===
- AMX-VCI
- AMX-10P

=== Armoured personnel carriers(APC's) ===
- Véhicule de l'Avant Blindé
