= Winchester Magnum =

Winchester Magnum refers to a "family" of belted magnum cartridges developed by the Winchester Repeating Arms Company, one of the oldest firearms manufacturers in the United States, in the late 1950s and early 1960s, all based on the same basic cartridge case derived from the .375 Holland & Holland Magnum. The basic case was a "short" magnum, meaning it would work through a standard (i.e.; .30-06 Springfield) length rifle action rather than requiring the longer, magnum (i.e. .375 Holland & Holland) actions. Nowadays, these are considered standard length, as the short length cartridges are classified as those who have similar dimensions to the .308 Winchester.

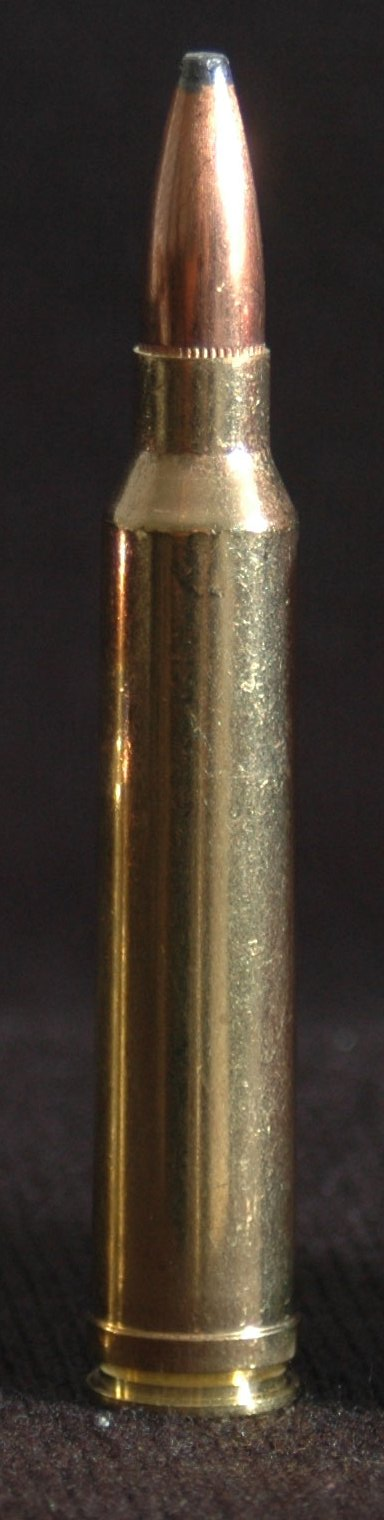
.300 Winchester Magnum

== Dimensions ==
The dimensions of the basic case are:

Winchester Magnum case dimensions
Outside diameter (at base)	.532 in. (13.51 mm)
Inside diameter (of case)	.490 in. (12.47 mm)
Maximum case length	2.62 in. (66.55 mm)

Originally known as a "short" magnum as compared to the .375 H&H Magnum, this is now considered the "long" magnum since the development of the family of Winchester Short Magnums. So today you would consider the .300 Winchester Magnum to be a "long action" cartridge.

== History ==
Before the introduction of Winchester Magnum family of cartridges, most cartridges offering a "Magnum" performance were restricted to Holland & Holland cartridges and Weatherby proprietary cartridges, either requiring a full-length magnum action or being chambered exclusively in high end rifles.

With the introduction of Winchester Magnum cartridges, during the 50s, hunters around the world could afford taking advantage of these cartridges available in large scale production rifles such manufactured around a standard length action.

The first to come was the .458 Winchester Magnum, a large bore centerfire cartridge released along with the resurge of the interest for the African Safari by the North American sports hunter inspired by Hemingway and Ruark's writings as well as by the post war booming. The .458 Win Mag was first released along with the Winchester Model 70 Safari Express rifle.

A couple of years later the .338 Winchester Magnum is released along with the Winchester Model 70 Alaskan model, just by when Alaska, the last hunting frontier, was founded as a State. The .338 Win Mag was marketed as the ideal cartridge for big game hunting in Alaska, especially a bear cartridge that was also suitable for a large variety of native game such as moose, caribou, dall ram and blacktail deer.

A year later and ahead of its time, the .264 Winchester Magnum was introduced along with the 26-inch barrel Winchester Model 70 "Westerner" rifle, which offered a very flat trajectory ideal for long range shots. The .264 Win Mag offered different bullet alternatives suitable for hunting mid sized big game as well as varmints. However, the .264 Win Mag popularity was short lived due to Remington's introduction of the 7mm Remington Magnum, a belted magnum with a similar case necked up to accept .284" bullets.

Due to the gaining popularity of the 7mm Rem Mag, in 1963 Winchester launched the last member of the Winchester Magnum family of cartridges; the .300 Winchester Magnum; a standard length action belted magnum driving a 180 grain bullet at 3000 fps, and a 150 grain bullet at a muzzle velocity of 3300 fps. The cartridge took off slowly but managed to gain popularity along the years to become the most popular "magnum" cartridge and one of the most popular big game cartridges in the world up to date, mainly due to its versatility, flat trajectory, and long range capability, pulling interest not only among hunters but, bench rest shooters, law enforcement, and military units around the globe.

== Cartridge list ==
The cartridges in this family are, in the order of development:

- .458 Winchester Magnum (1956): .458 in (11.6 mm) bullet
- .338 Winchester Magnum (1958): .338 in (8.6 mm) bullet
- .264 Winchester Magnum (1959): .264 in (6.7 mm) bullet
- .300 Winchester Magnum (1963): .308 in (7.8 mm) bullet
- 7mm Winchester Magnum (1962): .284 in (7.2 mm) bullet

With the exception of the .264 Win Mag, these cartridges are still widely used. The .458 Win Mag is used for dangerous game in Africa and by some Alaskan and Canadian bear guides. The .338 is used for game ranging from elk and African plains game to grizzly/brown bears and African lions. The .300 Win Mag is used for hunting large Alaskan game and other North American game.

== See also ==
- Winchester Short Magnum
- Winchester Super Short Magnum
- 6.8 Western, a Winchester-developed cartridge based on the .270 Winchester Short Magnum
- List of rifle cartridges
