= Heckler & Koch P2A1 =

H&K P2A1
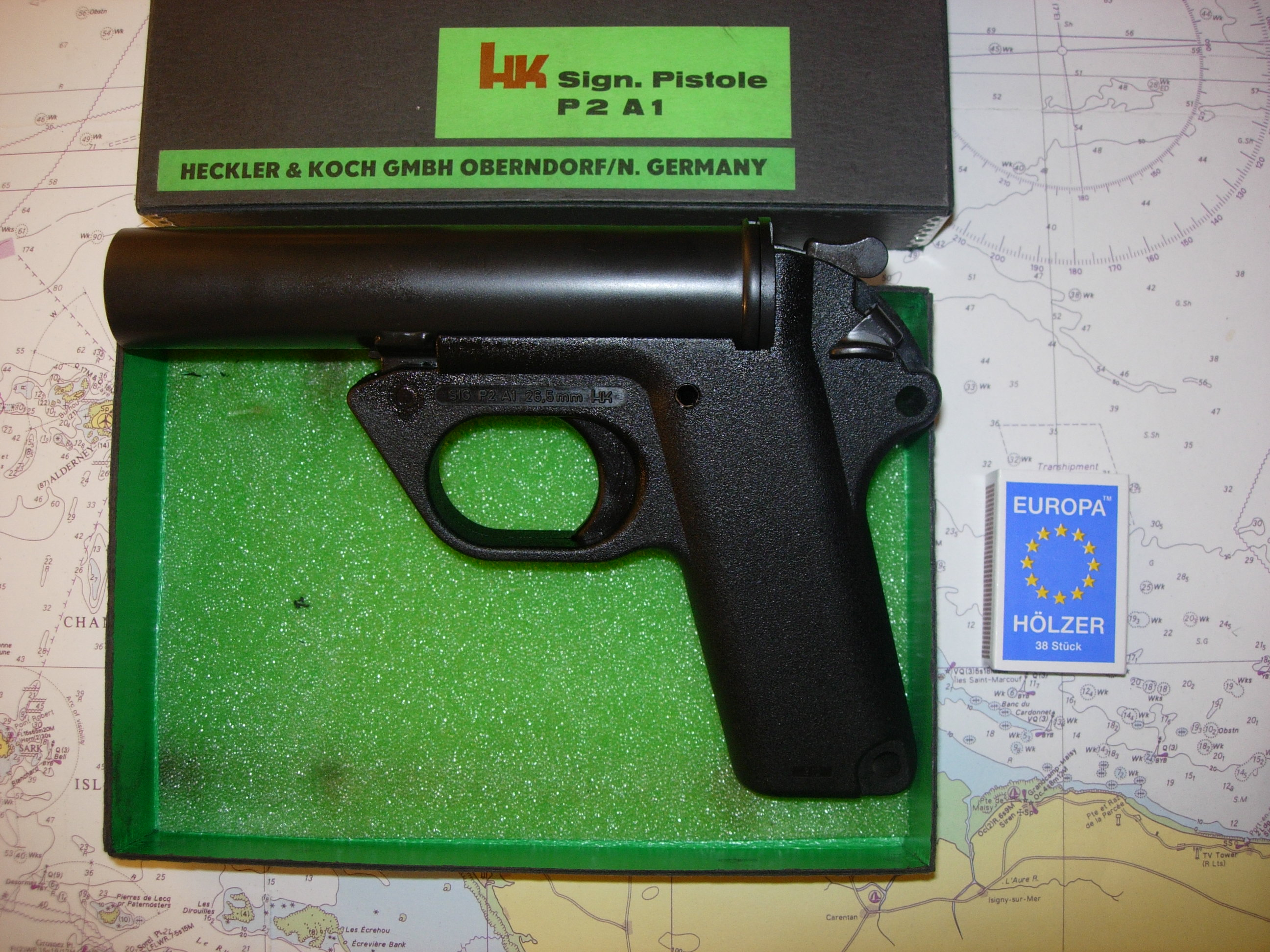
- Type: Flare pistol
- Place of origin: Germany

Production history
- Designed: 1974
- Manufacturer: Heckler & Koch
- Produced: 1974-present

Specifications
- Mass: 0.52 kg
- Length: 200 mm
- Barrel length: 155 mm
- Width: 38 mm
- Height: 145 mm
- Effective firing range: 305m; 45° degrees，height: 200 m
- Feed system: Single-shot, break action

The HK P2A1 is a single-shot, break action flare pistol designed for signaling and illumination purposes.

It can fire either 25 mm or 26.5 mm flares, or smoke cartridges. Adapters are available to use commercial 12-gauge flares available at sporting goods stores.

The body of the pistol is mostly polymer composite, with the barrel and breech being made of steel. The P2A1 has a life expectancy of about 1500 shots of full power flares.

The P2A1 is called the "SigPi" in the Bundeswehr, standing for "Signalpistole" or signal handgun.
