= M57 mortar =

Yugoslav artillery

M57
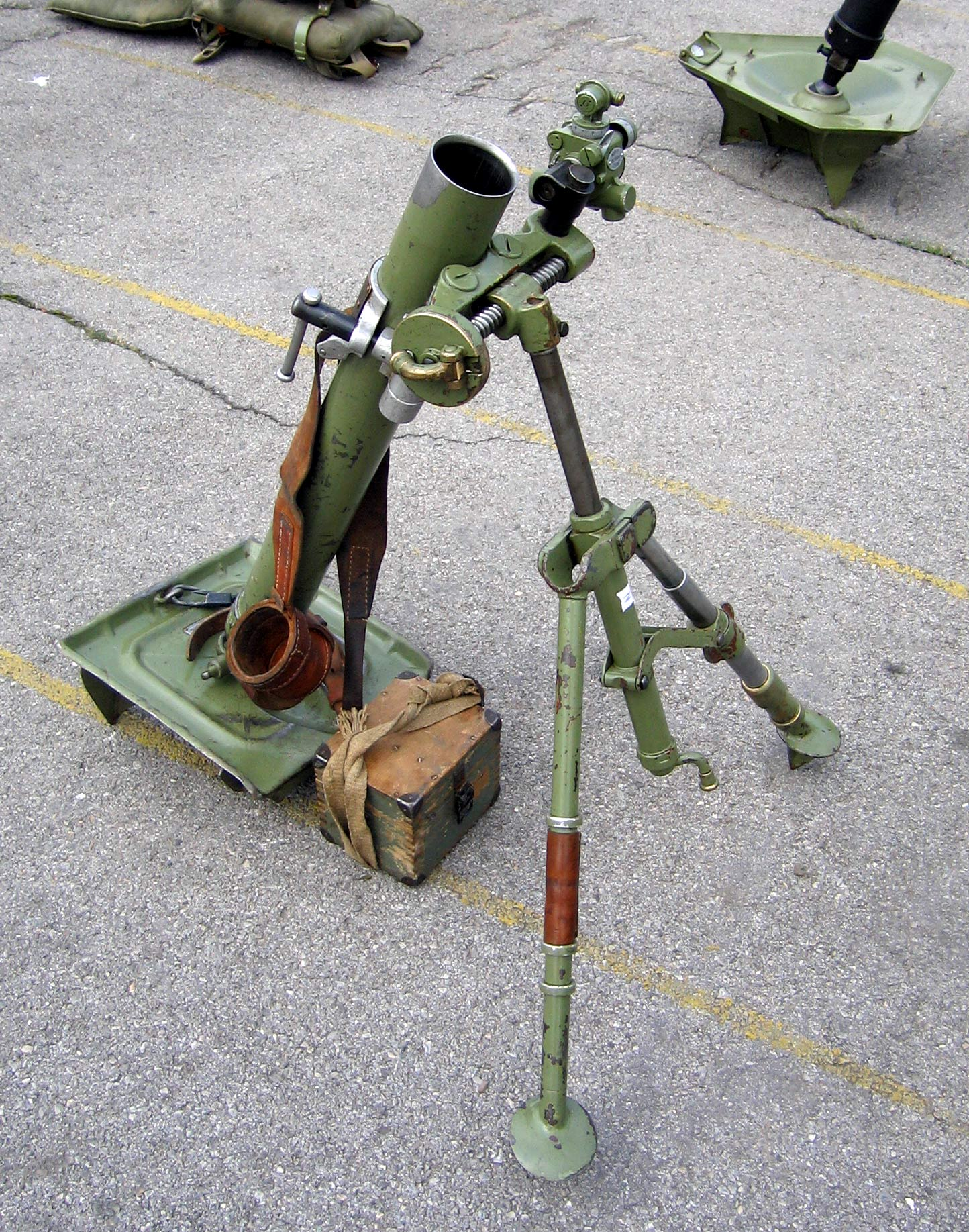
- Type: Infantry mortar
- Place of origin: Yugoslavia

Service history
- In service: 1957–present
- Wars: South African Border War; Yugoslav Wars; Second Liberian Civil War; Mali War

Production history
- Designer: Military Technical Institute
- Manufacturer: PPT Namenska

Specifications
- Mass: 19.7 kg
- Crew: 3
- Caliber: 60 millimetres (2.4 in)
- Rate of fire: 25–30 rpm
- Maximum firing range: 2,537 metres (8,323 ft) (M73)
- Feed system: Manual
- Sights: NSB-1

The M57 is a Yugoslav and Serbian 60mm infantry mortar generally based on the design of the US 60mm M2 Mortar. Currently, it is produced by the Serbian company PPT Namenska, and is still used by the Serbian Armed Forces' 72nd Brigade for Special Operations.

== Purpose ==
The M57 60mm mortar is intended for short-range fire support and is capable of eliminating infantry, firing posts and machine gun nests.

== Ammunition ==
HE Mortar Shell

- 60 mm HE Mortar Shell M73 P4
- 60 mm HE Mortar Shell M73 P3

Smoke Mortar Shell

- 60 mm Smoke Mortar Shell M73P2
- 60 mm High-Smoke Mortar Shell M93

Illuminating Mortar Shell

- 60 mm Illuminating Mortar Shell M67P2

== Operators ==
- Armenia
- Bosnia and Herzegovina
- Liberia
- Mali
- North Macedonia
- Namibia
- Serbia
- Ukraine – One filmed in use by Ukrainian fighters

== See also ==
- M2 mortar
- M224 mortar
