= M90 Stršljen =

RBR-120 mm M90 "Strsljen"
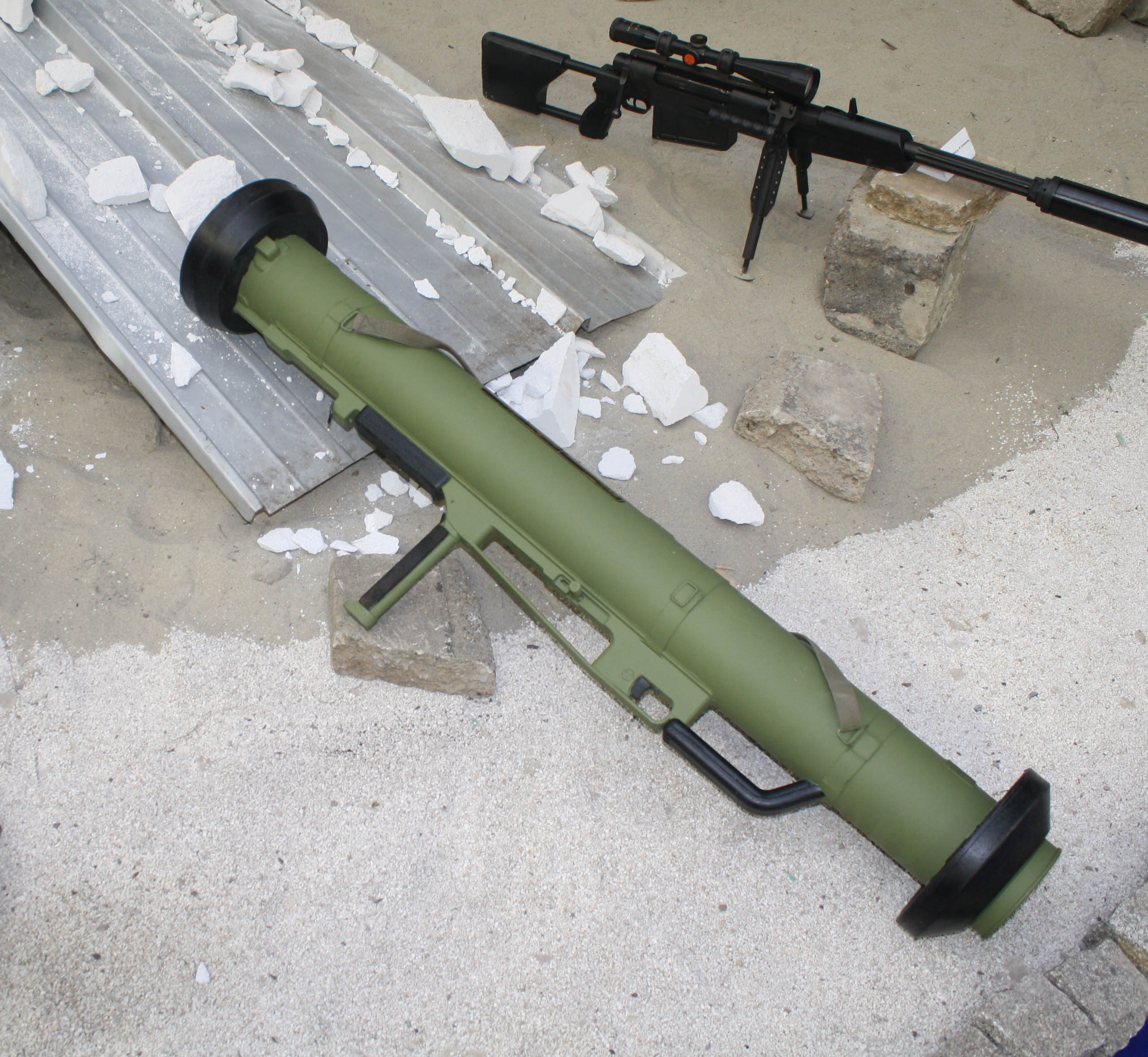
- Type: Anti-tank rocket launcher
- Place of origin: Serbia / North Macedonia

Service history
- In service: 2002–present
- Used by: Serbia; North Macedonia; Iraq; Syria; Hamas
- Wars: Syrian Civil War; War in Iraq (2013-17)

Production history
- Designer: Military Technical Institute
- Manufacturer: Sloboda
- Produced: 2002–present
- No. built: 1,010+

Specifications
- Mass: 13.00 kg (loaded); 5.70 kg (launcher); 7.30 kg (rocket)
- Length: 1,350 mm (launcher loaded, sealed); 1,300 mm (launcher, in firing position)
- Crew: 1
- Caliber: 120 mm
- Action: 800 mm RHA
- Muzzle velocity: 205 m/s
- Effective firing range: 250 m
- Maximum firing range: 1,960 m
- Sights: Iron sights

The RBR-120 mm M90 (nicknamed Stršljen, from Serbian: стршљен, lit. 'hornet') is a light-weight, single-use, unguided anti-tank rocket launcher. The launcher is produced by Eurokompozit of Prilep, North Macedonia and Poliester of Priboj, Serbia, while the anti-tank rocket is produced by Sloboda of Čačak, Serbia. It is intended for use against tanks and other armoured vehicles in addition to fortifications and infantry.

On impact, a piezoelectric impact fuse in the rocket triggers the shaped charge warhead, which can penetrate an equivalent of over 800 millimetres (31 in) of RHA.

== Design ==
The M90 consists of a disposable rocket launcher and a HEAT projectile which is propelled by an impulse-type sustainer.

== Users ==
- Iraq
- North Macedonia
- Serbia
- Syrian opposition
- Hamas
