= M79 Osa =

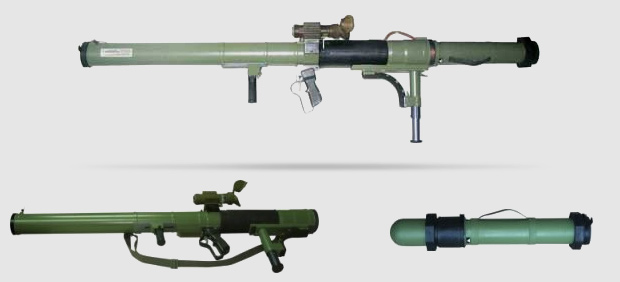
- Type: Anti-tank rocket launcher
- Place of origin: Yugoslavia

Service history
- Used by: See Operators
- Wars: Yugoslav Wars; Syrian Civil War; Yemeni Civil War

Production history
- Designer: Military Technical Institute
- Designed: 1979
- Manufacturer: Sloboda

Specifications
- Mass: 11.2 kg (loaded); 6.2 kg (launcher); 3.5 kg (rocket)
- Length: 1.91 m (launcher loaded); 0.67 m (rocket)
- Crew: 2
- Caliber: 90 mm
- Rate of fire: 6 rounds per minute
- Muzzle velocity: 250 m/s
- Effective firing range: 350 m (AFVs); 600 m (Buildings)
- Maximum firing range: 1,960 m
- Sights: CN-6 (3.5× optical sight) or flip up iron sights
- Blast yield: 400 mm RHA

The M79 Osa (from Serbian: оса, lit. 'wasp') is a Yugoslav-made portable 90 mm anti-tank weapon made of fibre-reinforced plastics. It resembles the French portable anti-tank launcher 89 mm LRAC F1. The M79 shoots unguided projectiles in direct sight and is effective against armoured fighting vehicles and fortifications.

== Operational history ==
The M79 was widely used in the Yugoslav Wars.

A large number of M79 OSA rocket launchers were supplied to rebels in Syria which proved effective in deterring the Syrian Army's armor. Many mistook the M79 supplied to the rebels in Syria for the Russian RPG-29 rocket launcher, which also saw use. M79 Osas were also used in Iraq by Islamic State against Iraqi army and JANES reported their use against US-made M1A1 Abrams tanks.

In September 2014, the Houthi movement seized Sanaa, the capital city of Yemen, and in March 2015 the Saudi coalition launched an all out war on them all over Yemen. A large stockpile of M79 Osa rocket launchers and rockets were found in Yemeni military weapons depots. All sides of the conflict have used the M79 since 2015.

== Design ==
The M79 Osa was designed and manufactured by Sloboda in the former Yugoslavia. It has continued production in Serbia, North Macedonia, and in Croatia (as the RL90 M95). The rocket launcher consists of a launcher, rocket, CN-6 sight and carrying case.

=== Operation ===
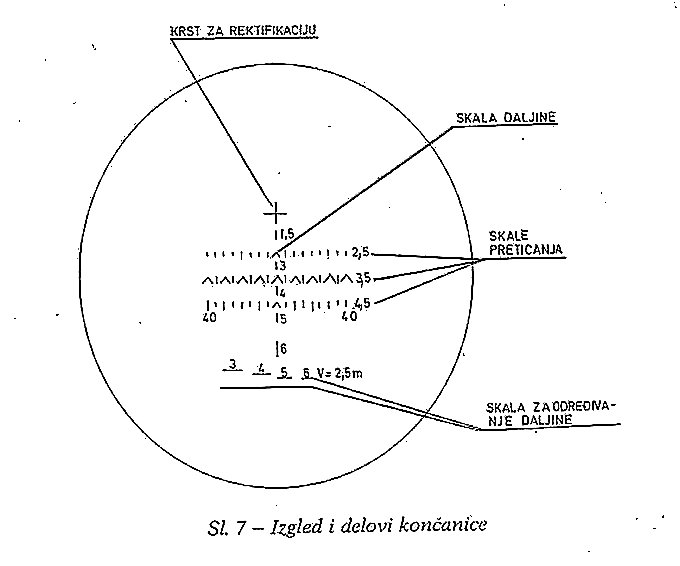
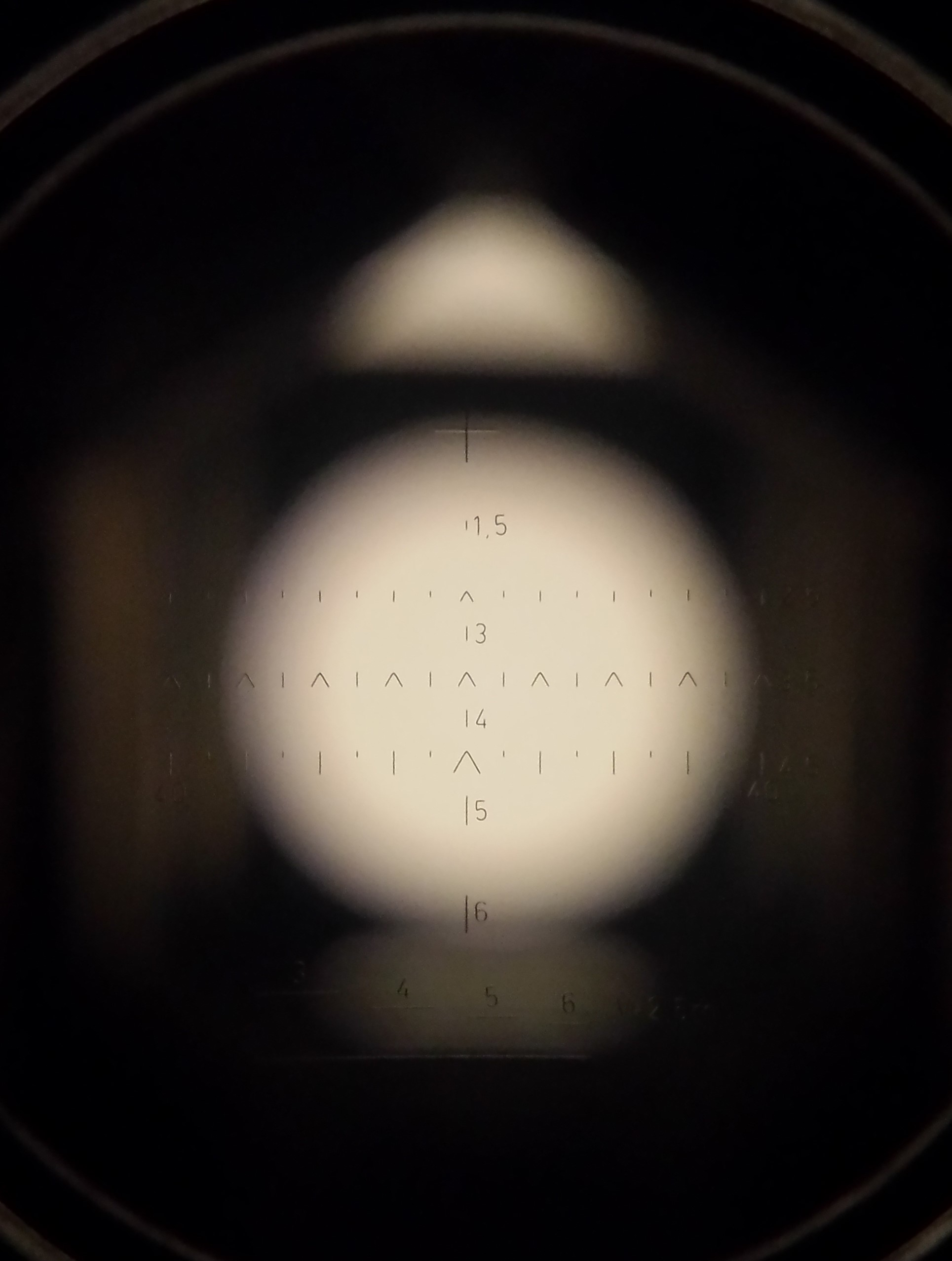
CN-6 reticle

The M79 Osa is operated by a two-man team, an operator and a loader. The loader inserts the rocket container through the rear of the launcher. The operator then takes aim at the target through the CN-6 sight. The CN-6 sight has 3.5x magnification and a 10 degree field of view. It also features anti-laser filters to protect the operator from blinding battlefield lasers. When the trigger is pressed, the rocket motor is fired electronically. The rocket leaves the launcher at a speed of approximately 250 meters per second. It is accurate enough to be used against armoured vehicles at a range of 350 meters, and can engage larger stationary targets up to 600 meters away.

On impact a piezoelectric impact fuse in the rocket triggers the shaped charge warhead, which can penetrate up to 400 millimeters of armour. The fuse is sensitive enough to trigger the warhead at impact angles up to 70 degrees from the vertical. After firing, the spent rocket container is removed from the launcher, and a fresh tube is attached.

== Operators ==
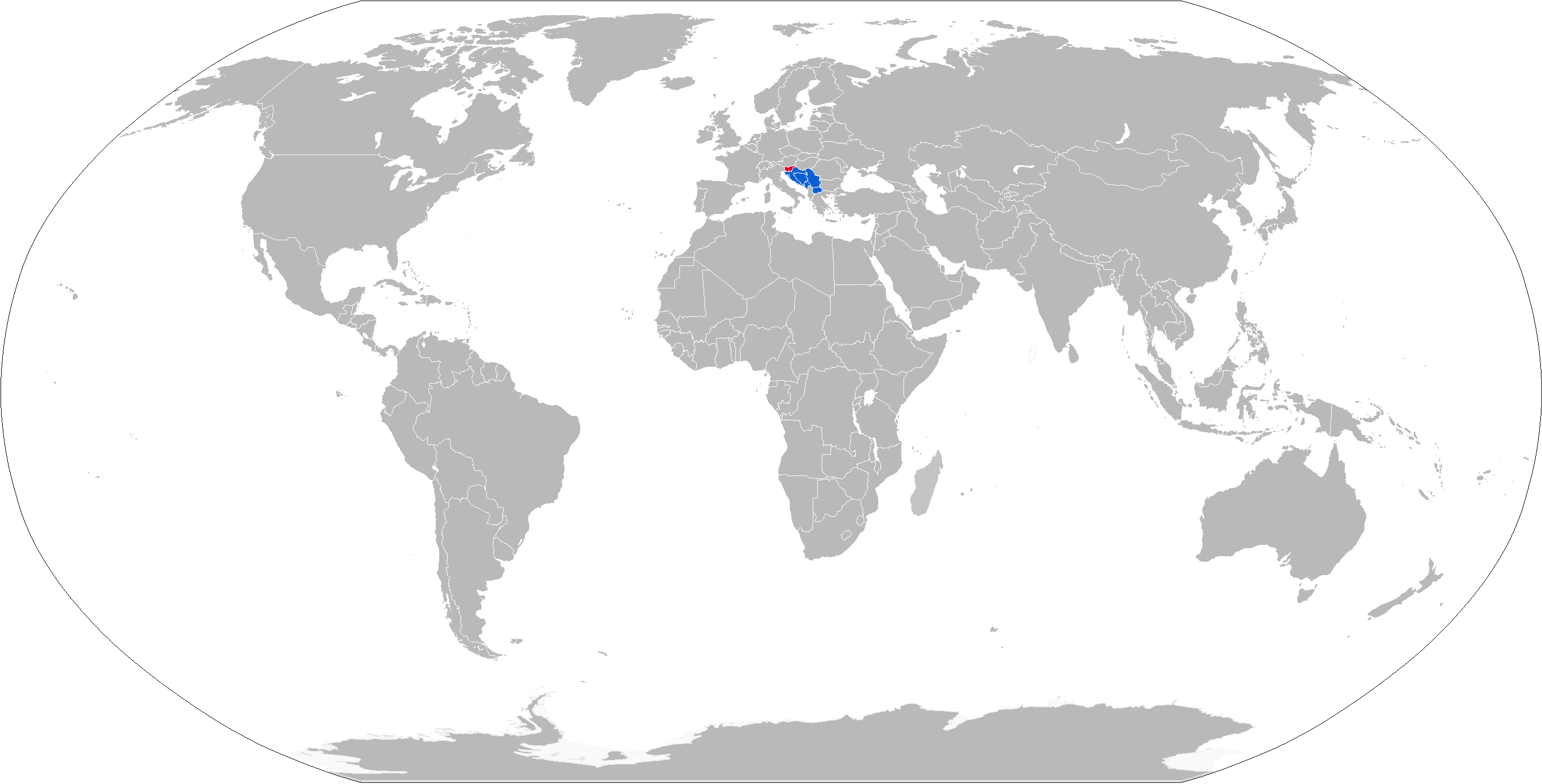
Map with M79 operators in blue and former operators in red

=== Current operators ===
- Bosnia and Herzegovina
- Croatia (RL90 M95)
- North Macedonia
- Montenegro
- Serbia: Modernized versions with new rockets.
- Syria
- Yemen

=== Non state operators ===
- (Syria) Free Syrian Army
- Ahrar al-Sham
- Islamic State
- Kurdistan Workers' Party

=== Former operators ===
- Yugoslavia
- Slovenia

== See also ==
- Alcotán-100
- Sloboda Čačak
